= American imperialism =

Expansion of American political, economic, and military influence

American imperialism (Note: Also referred to as United States imperialism, US imperialism, or U.S. imperialism.) is the exercise of power by the United States outside its borders. The United States expanded its territory initially via conquest and colonialism, later shifting to controlling/influencing other countries without conquest, using techniques such as alliances; neocolonialism; aid; gunboat diplomacy; unequal treaties; trade; sanctions; support for preferred political factions; regime change; economic influence via private companies; soft power; and cultural influence.

American expansion ended in the late 19th century, with the exception of some Caribbean and Western Pacific islands. While the United States does not typically describe itself as an empire, some commentators, including Max Boot, Arthur M. Schlesinger Jr., and Niall Ferguson, have characterized it as one.

Foreign interventions by the United States have been debated throughout its history. Opponents claimed that such actions were inconsistent with the country's beginnings as a colony that rebelled against an overseas king, as well as with American values of democracy, freedom, and independence.

Conversely, American presidents who intervened militarily—most notably William McKinley, Woodrow Wilson, Theodore Roosevelt, and William Howard Taft—cited American economic interests, such as trade and debt management; preventing European intervention (colonial or otherwise) in the Western Hemisphere, (under the 1823 Monroe Doctrine); and the benefits of keeping "good order". President Donald Trump has reintroduced these policies during his second term, but commentators have suggested that it is simply "standard U.S. foreign policy stripped of hypocrisy."

== History ==
An animation showing major changes in the territorial expansion of the United States, 1776–1979.

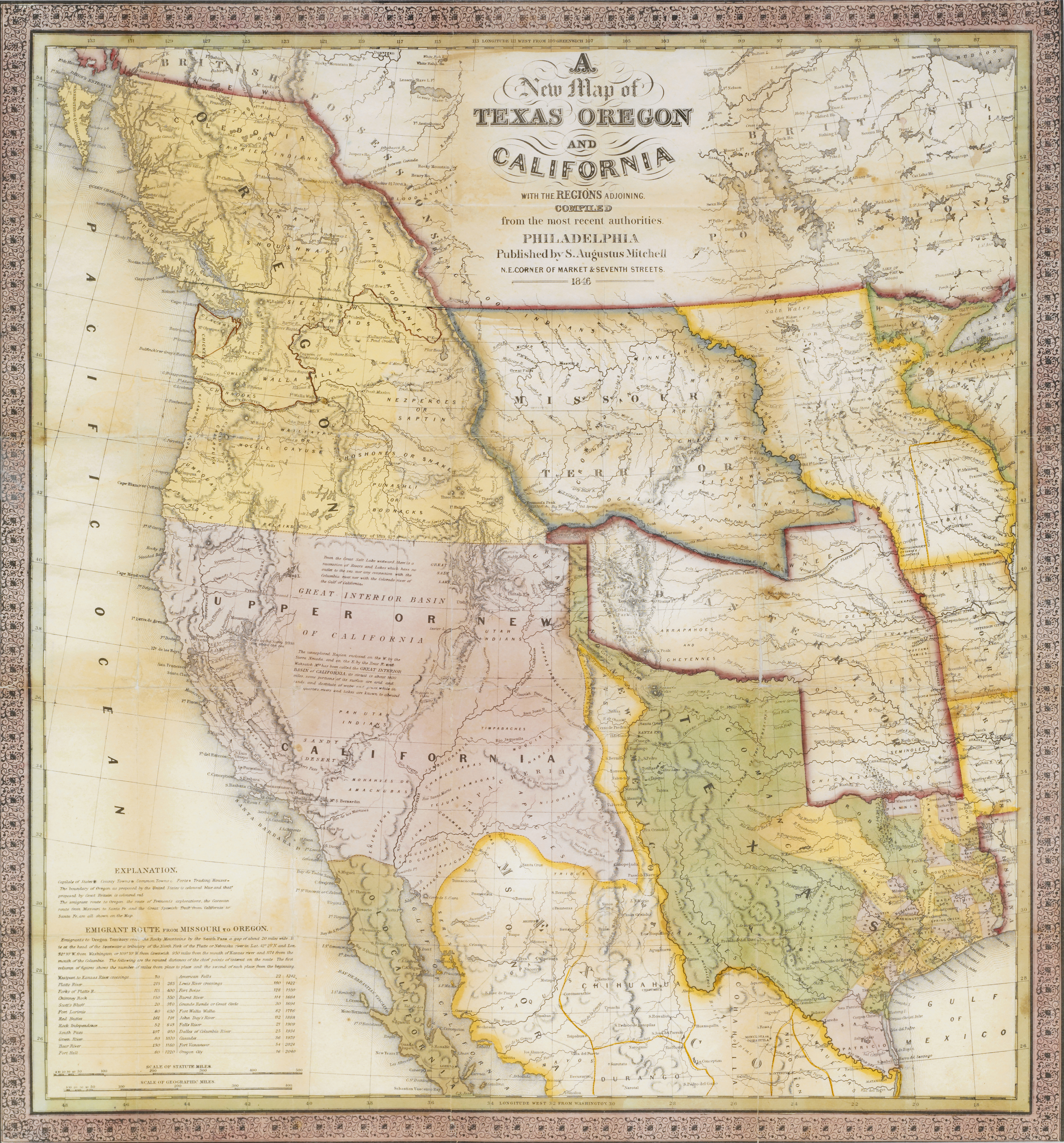
A New Map of Texas, Oregon, and California, Samuel Augustus Mitchell, 1846

Following Columbus, the European and then American presence steadily expanded across what became the United States of America as a process of settler colonialism, dispossessing or eliminating various Native American communities by treaty or by force, including multiple wars. Many Native American settlements were depopulated by unwittingly imported diseases, such as smallpox. Native Americans became citizens in 1924 and experience a form of tribal sovereignty.

President James Monroe promulgated his Monroe Doctrine in 1823, in order to end European interventions in Latin America. Territorial expansion was explicit in the 19th century idea of manifest destiny. The 1803 Louisiana Purchase transferred 828,000 sq mi (2,140,000 km^{2}) of territory claimed by France to the United States. Via the 1846–1848 Mexican–American War, the United States annexed 525,000 sq mi (1,360,000 km^{2}) of Mexican territory. In 1867, the Andrew Johnson administration purchased Alaska's 665,384 sq mi (1,723,340 km^{2}) from Russia.

American foreign policy pivoted to "containing" communism during the Cold War. In accordance with the Truman Doctrine and the Reagan Doctrine, the United States attempted to limit the Soviet Union and its allies. During the Vietnam War, the United States attempt to protect South Vietnam from its communist neighbor to the north and a domestic insurgency ended in failure at tremendous cost in American and Vietnamese lives and a Khmer Rouge-perpetrated genocide in neighboring Cambodia. US tactics included attempts at regime change in countries including Iran, Cuba, Panama, and Grenada, along with interference in other countries' elections.

US acquisitions on the North American continent became states, and their residents became citizens. Residents of Hawaii voted for statehood in 1959. Other island jurisdictions remain territories, namely Guam, Puerto Rico, the US Virgin Islands, American Samoa, and the Northern Mariana Islands, but their residents are also citizens. The remainder of US territories eventually became independent, including three freely associated states that participate in US government programs in exchange for military basing rights, to Cuba, which severed diplomatic relations with the United States during the Cold War.

The United States was a public advocate of European decolonization after World War II (completing a ten-year independence transition for its Philippines territory in 1944). The United States often came in conflict with national liberation movements.

=== 1700s–1800s: Manifest destiny ===
In 1786, then-private citizen George Washington described the new nation as an "infant empire". Then-Minister Plenipotentiary Thomas Jefferson asserted that year that the United States of America "must be viewed as the nest from which all America, North & South is to be peopled. [...] The navigation of the Mississippi we must have".

The notion of manifest destiny was a popular 19th century rationale for US expansion. Discontent with British rule came in part from the Royal Proclamation of 1763, which barred settlement west of the Appalachian Mountains.

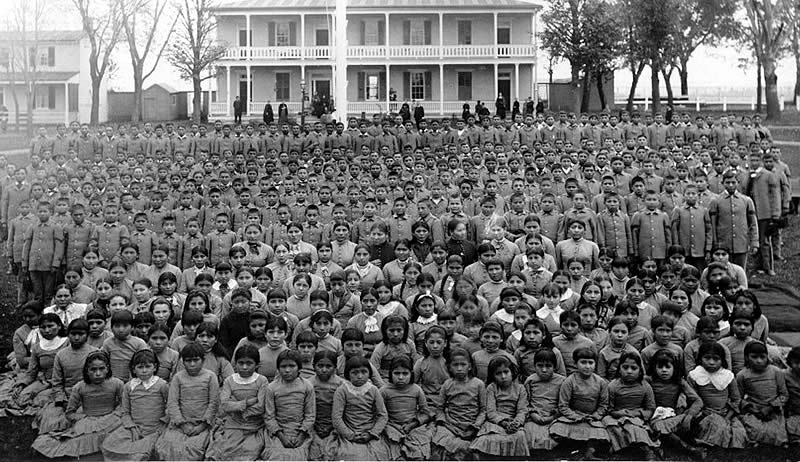
Native American students at the Carlisle Indian Industrial School, an American Indian boarding school and a site of cultural assimilation, in the US Army's Carlisle Barracks.

The Indian Wars featured British (initially) and later US militaries battling Native American sovereign groups. That sovereignty was repeatedly undermined by American state policy (usually involving unequal or broken treaties) and the ever-expanding settlements. Following the Dawes Act of 1887, Native American systems of land tenure ended in favor of private property. This resulted in the loss of some 100 million acres of land from 1887 to 1934.

In the 1786–1795 Northwest Indian War, the United States fought the Northwestern Confederacy over land around the Great Lakes. Treaties such as the Treaty of Greenville and the Treaty of Fort Wayne drove anti-American sentiment among Native Americans in the region, leading to Tecumseh's Confederacy, defeated during the War of 1812.

The Indian Removal Act of 1830 culminated in the relocation of 60,000 Native Americans West of the Mississippi River in an event known as the Trail of Tears, killing 16,700.

In the 1846–1849 Mexican–American War, the United States conquered Mexican territory reaching from Texas to the Pacific coast.

Settlement of California accelerated, including the California genocide. Estimates of deaths vary from 2,000 to 100,000. The discovery of gold drew many miners and settlers who formed militias to kill and displace Native Americans. The California government supported expansion and settlement through the passage of the Act for the Government and Protection of Indians which legalized the forced indenture (effectively enslavement) of Native Americans. Some California towns offered and paid bounties for the killing of Native Americans.

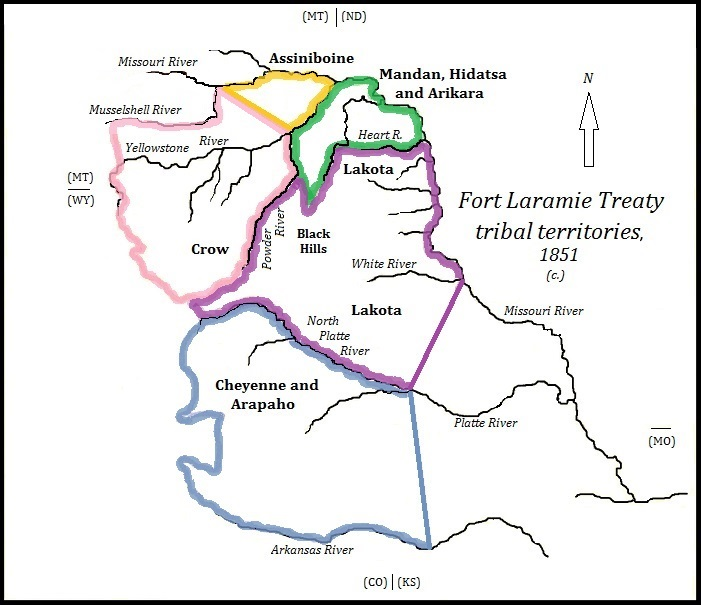
Indian land as defined by the Treaty of Fort Laramie

American expansion in the Great Plains spurred conflict between many western tribes and the US. The 1851 Treaty of Fort Laramie gave the Cheyenne and Arapaho tribes territory from the North Platte River in present-day Wyoming and Nebraska southward to the Arkansas River in what became Colorado and Kansas. The land was initially not wanted by settlers, but following the discovery of gold in the region, settlers came in large numbers. In 1861, six chiefs of the Southern Cheyenne and four of the Arapaho signed the Treaty of Fort Wise, surrendering 90% of their land. The refusal of various warriors to recognize the treaty led settlers to expect war. The subsequent Colorado War included the Sand Creek Massacre in which up to 600 Cheyenne were killed, mostly children and women. On October 14, 1865, the chiefs of what remained of the Southern Cheyenne and Arapahos agreed to move south of the Arkansas, sharing land that belonged to the Kiowas, and thereby relinquished all claims in Colorado territory.

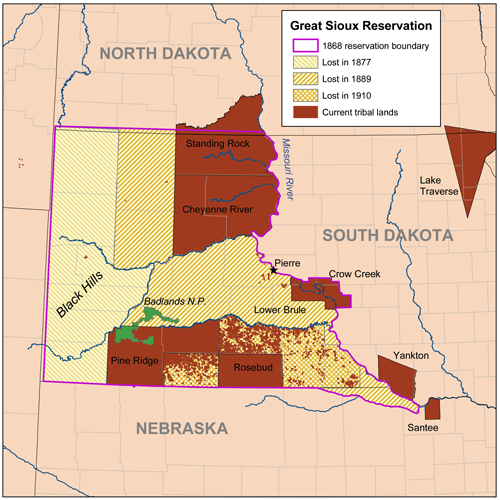
Map showing the Great Sioux Reservation and current reservations

Following Red Cloud's victory in Red Cloud's War, the Treaty of Fort Laramie was signed. This treaty led to the creation of the Great Sioux Reservation. However, the discovery of gold in the Black Hills resulted in a settlement surge. The gold rush was profitable for settlers and the government: the Black Hill Mine produced $500 million in gold. Attempts to purchase the land failed, triggering the Great Sioux War. Despite initial success by Native American forces, most notably the Battle of the Little Bighorn, the government won and carved the reservation into smaller tracts.

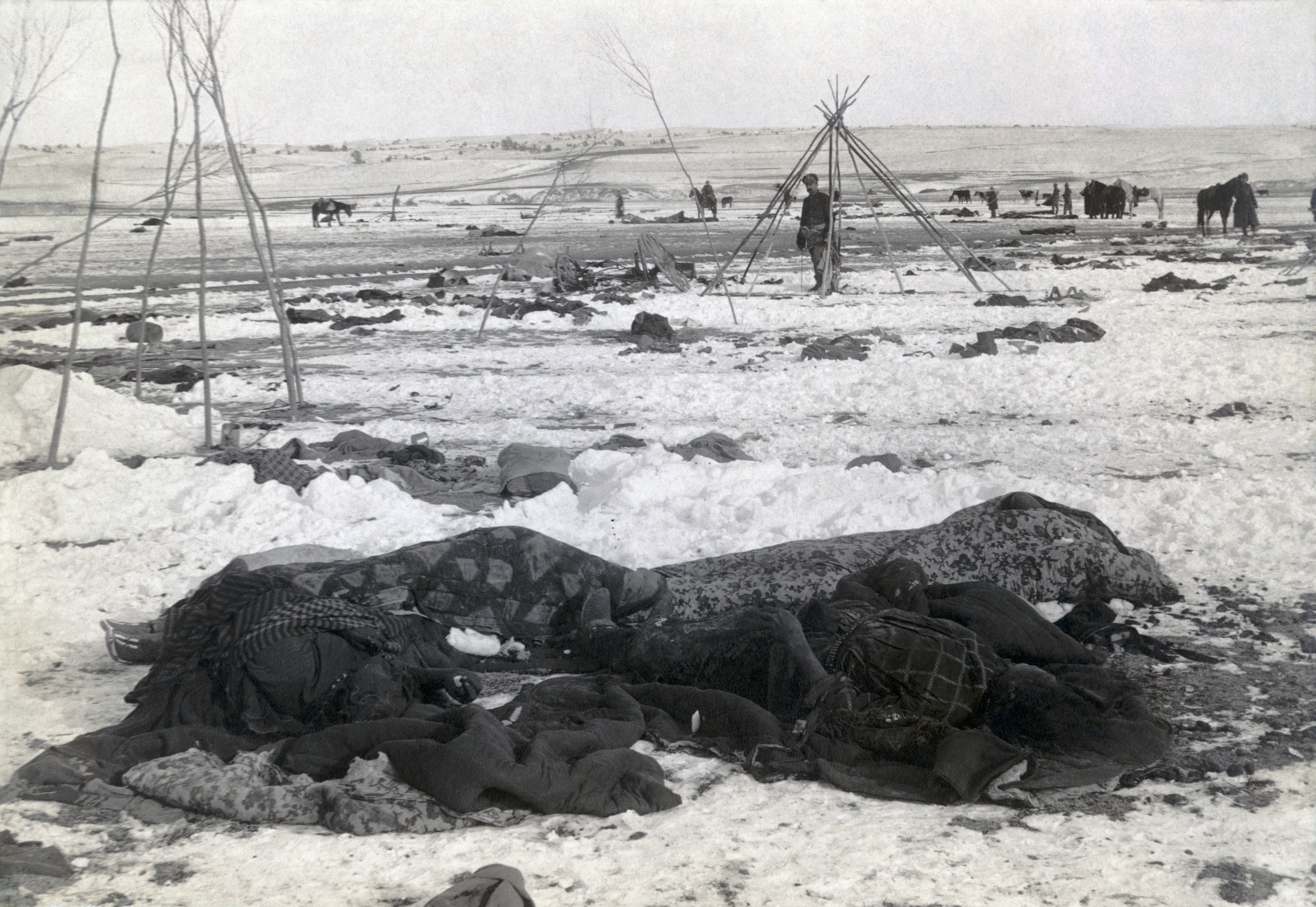
Big Foot's camp three weeks after Wounded Knee Massacre; with bodies of four Lakota Sioux wrapped in blankets in the foreground

In the southwest, settlers waged war against native tribes. By 1871, Tucson had a population of three thousand, including "saloon-keepers, traders and contractors who had profited during the Civil War". In the Camp Grant Massacre of 1871, up to 144 Apache were killed, mostly women and children. Up to 27 Apache children were captured and sold by Christianized Papago Indians into slavery in Mexico. In the 1860s, the Navajo faced deportation, which became known as the Long Walk of the Navajo. The journey started in spring 1864. Navajo led by the US Army were relocated from eastern Arizona Territory and western New Mexico Territory to Fort Sumner. Around 200 died during the walk. New Mexican slavers, assisted by Utes, attacked isolated bands, killing the men, taking the women and children, and capturing horses and livestock. As part of these raids, Navajo were sold throughout the region.

In 1820, the private American Colonization Society began subsidizing free black Americans to colonize the west coast of Africa. In 1822, it established the colony of Liberia, which became independent in 1847. By 1857, Liberia had merged with colonies formed by other societies, including the Republic of Maryland, Mississippi-in-Africa, and Kentucky in Africa.

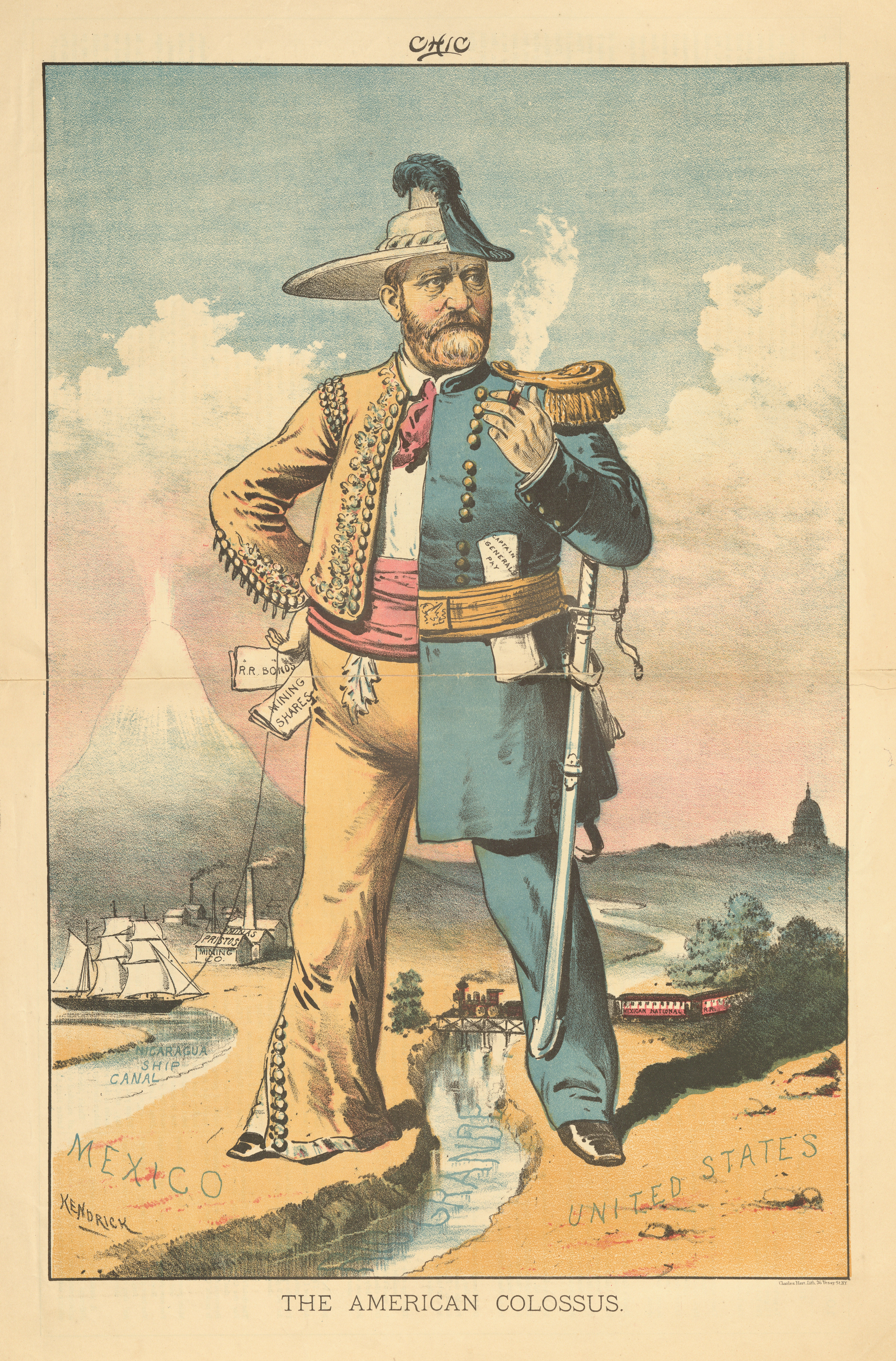
The American Colossus (1880), shown connected to the US, Mexico, and Nicaragua

In older historiography mercenary William Walker's attempts to create private colonies epitomized antebellum American imperialism. His brief seizure of Nicaragua in 1855 followed his attempt to expand slavery into Central America and establish colonies in Mexico. Walker failed in his escapades and never had US backing. Historian Michel Gobat claimed that Walker was invited by Nicaraguan liberals seeking modernization and liberalism. Walker's government included those liberals, as well as Yankee colonizers and European radicals.

=== 1890s–1900s: New Imperialism ===
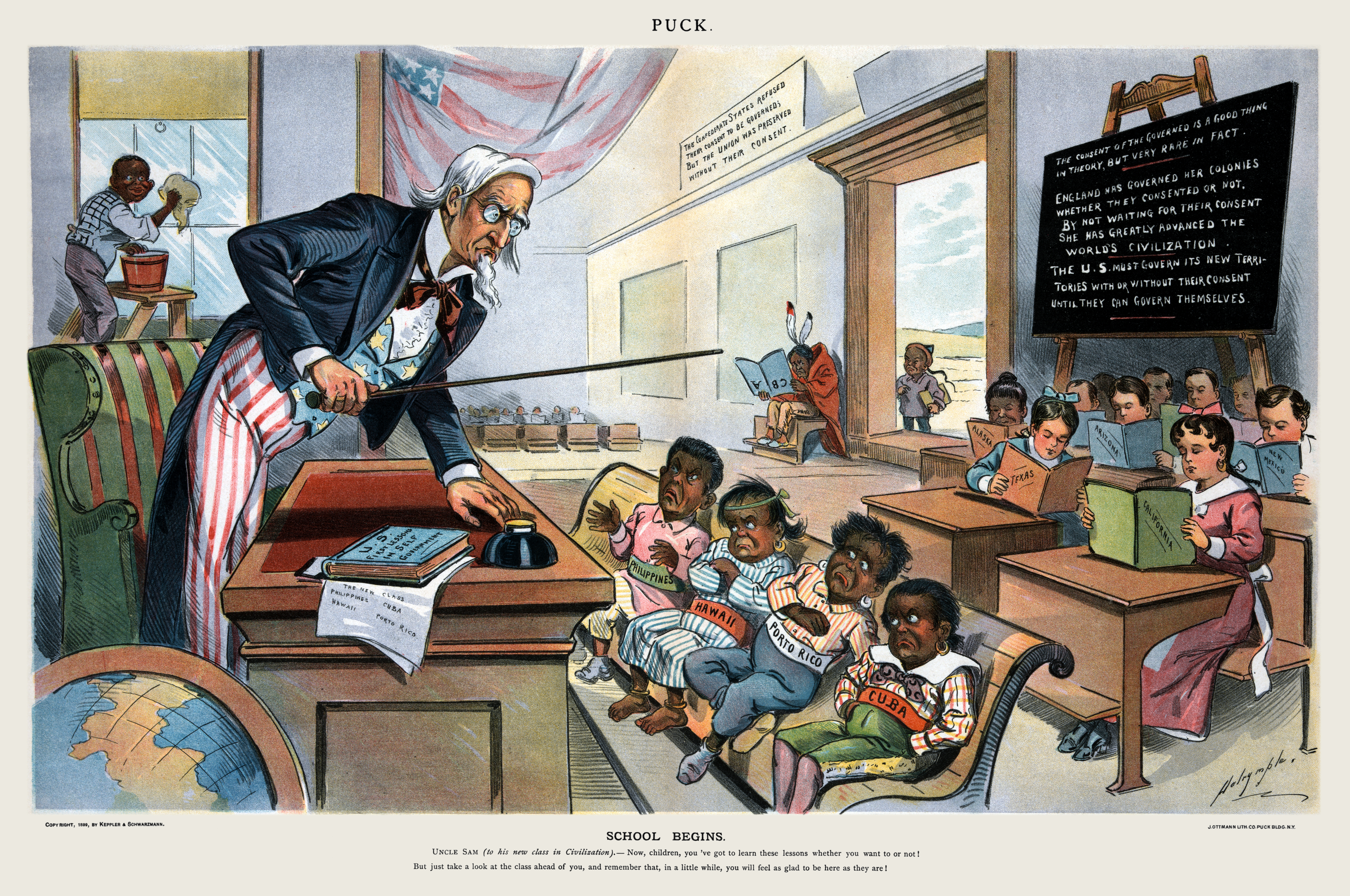
Caricature by Louis Dalrymple showing Uncle Sam lecturing four children labeled Philippines, Hawaii, Porto Rico, and Cuba, in front of children holding books labeled with various US states and territories. A black boy is washing windows, a Native American sits separate from the class, and a Chinese boy is outside the door. The caption reads: "School Begins. Uncle Sam (to his new class in Civilization): Now, children, you've got to learn these lessons whether you want to or not! But just take a look at the class ahead of you, and remember that, in a little while, you will feel as glad to be here as they are!"

In the late 19th century, Great Britain, France, Germany and Belgium rapidly expanded their territorial possessions, particularly in Africa. The US expanded also, annexing Pacific Islands such as Hawaii.

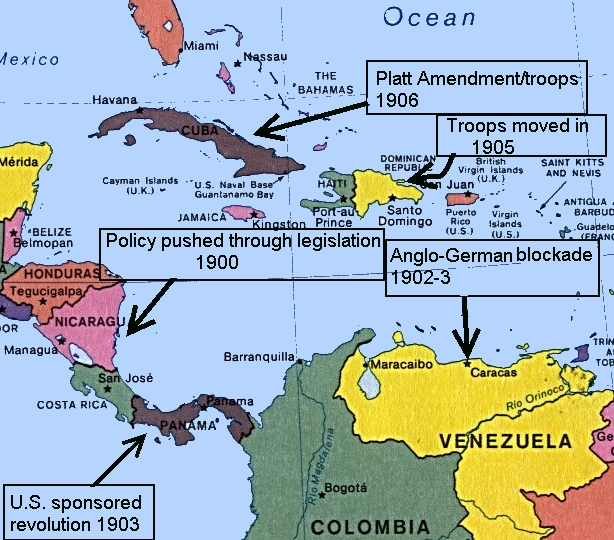
A map of Central America, showing the places affected by Theodore Roosevelt's Big Stick policy

As Assistant Secretary of the Navy, Theodore Roosevelt was instrumental in preparing for the Spanish–American War and was an enthusiastic proponent of testing the US military in battle, at one point stating "I should welcome almost any war, for I think this country needs one." Roosevelt rejected imperialism, but embraced expansionism. Rudyard Kipling wrote the poem "The White Man's Burden" for Roosevelt, who told colleagues that it was "rather poor poetry, but good sense from the expansion point of view". Roosevelt proclaimed what became the Roosevelt Corollary to the Monroe Doctrine (in turn replaced by Herbert Hoover's endorsement of the Clark Memorandum).

One causal factor was racism, evidenced by philosopher Fiske's belief in "Anglo-Saxon" racial superiority and clergyman Strong's call to "civilize and Christianize" other peoples. The concepts were related to Social Darwinism in some schools of American thought.

Industry and trade were other justifications. American intervention in Latin America and Hawaii supported investments, including sugar, pineapple, and bananas. When the US annexed a territory, it achieved trade access there. In 1898, Senator Albert Beveridge claimed that market expansion was necessary, writing "American factories are making more than the American people can use; American soil is producing more than they can consume. Fate has written our policy for us; the trade of the world must and shall be ours."

==== Cuba ====
The US claimed to intervene in Cuba in the name of freedom: "We are coming, Cuba, coming; we are bound to set you free! We are coming from the mountains, from the plains and inland sea! We are coming with the wrath of God to make the Spaniards flee! "(lyrics to "Cuba Libre", 1898). Cuba became independent in 1898 following the Spanish–American War. However, from 1898 until the Cuban revolution, the US directly influenced the Cuban economy. By 1906, up to 15% of Cuba was owned by Americans.

The 1901 Platt Amendment prevented Cuba from entering into agreements with foreign nations and granted the US the right to build naval stations on Cuban soil.

==== Philippines ====
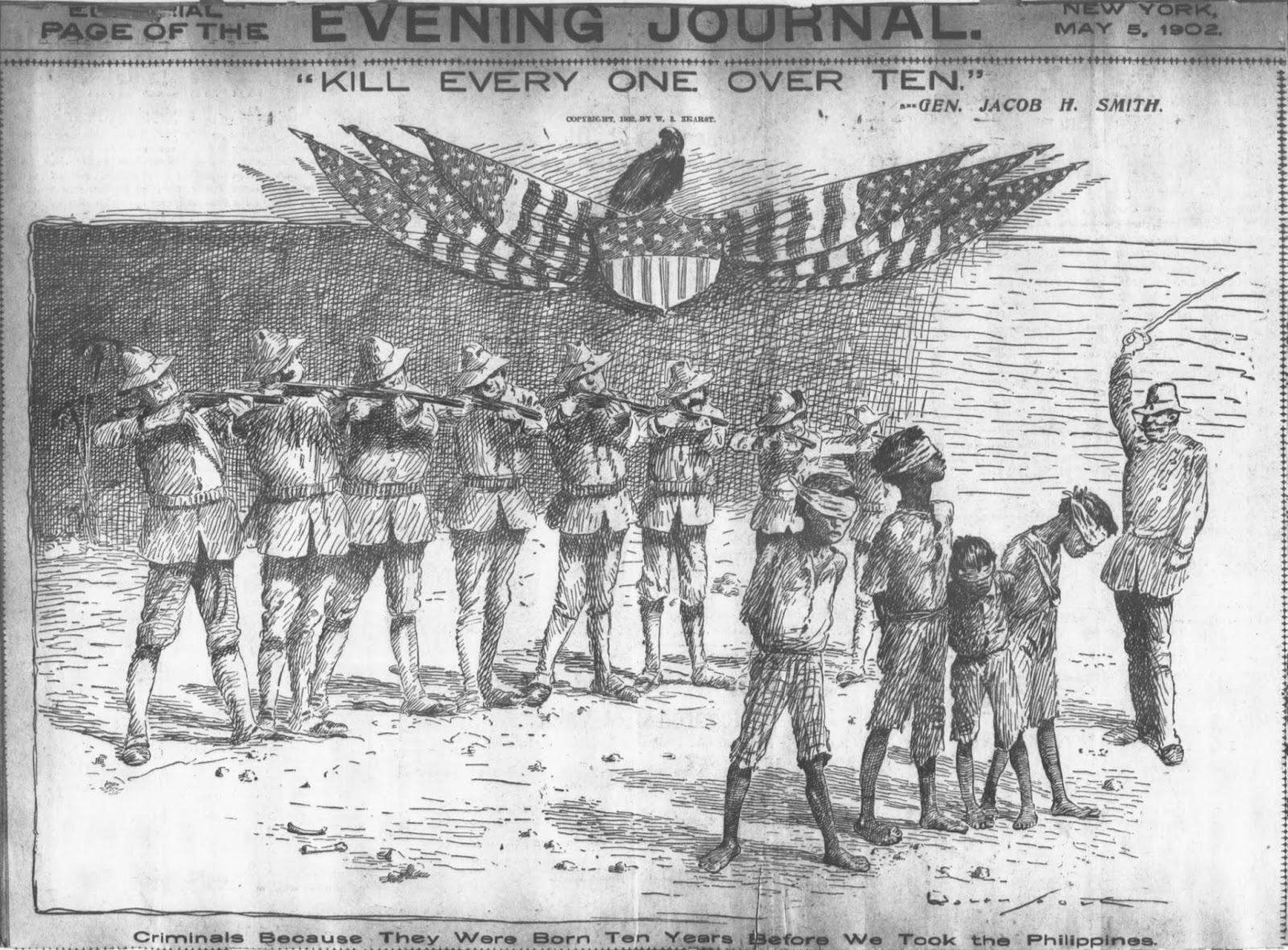
One of the New York Journal's most infamous cartoons, depicting Philippine–American War General Jacob H. Smith's order "Kill Everyone over Ten," from the front page on May 5, 1902

In 1899, Filipino revolutionary General Emilio Aguinaldo remarked: "The Filipinos fighting for Liberty, the American people fighting them to give them liberty. The two peoples are fighting on parallel lines for the same object." American rule of ceded Spanish territory was first contested in the Philippine–American War, ultimately resulting in the end of the short-lived Philippine Republic.

Following Philippine independence, the US continued to exert influence over the country through Central Intelligence Agency (CIA) operatives such as Edward Lansdale, who heavily managed the political rise and 1953 presidential campaign of Ramon Magsaysay. While some popular accounts allege that Lansdale physically struck Magsaysay over a drafted speech, declassified documents instead highlight covert political operations to undermine President Elpidio Quirino and discussions by Manila-based CIA agents to poison Senator Claro Recto. Filipino historian Roland G. Simbulan called the CIA "US imperialism's clandestine apparatus in the Philippines".

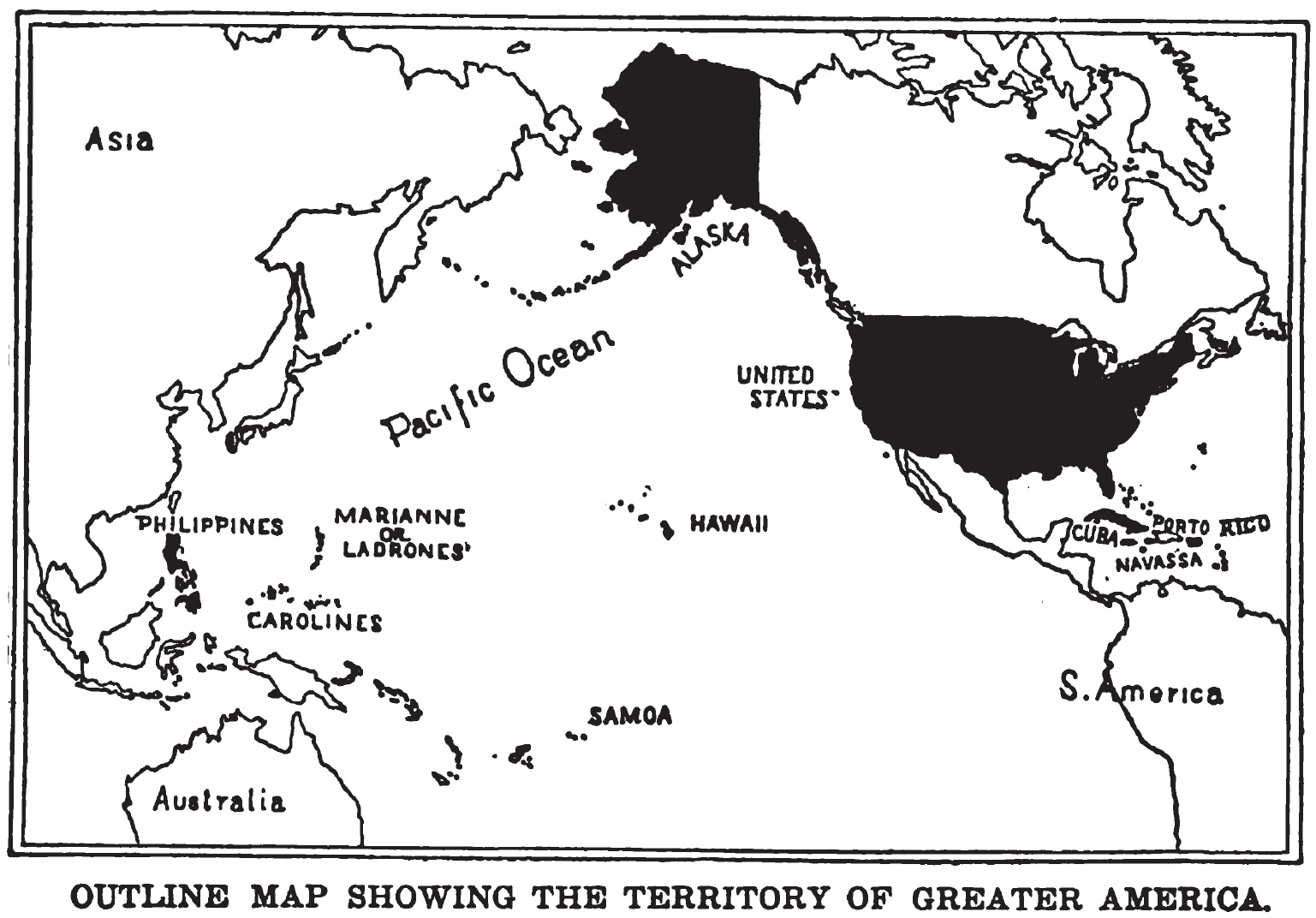
A map of "Greater America" c. 1900, including overseas territories

The US established dozens of military bases, including some that were large. Philippine independence was gated by American legislation. For example, the Bell Trade Act provided a mechanism whereby US import quotas could be established on Philippine goods that competed with US products. It further required US citizens and corporations be granted equal access to Philippine natural resources. In 1946, Assistant Secretary of State for Economic Affairs William L. Clayton described the law as "clearly inconsistent with the basic foreign economic policy of this country" and "clearly inconsistent with our promise to grant the Philippines genuine independence." Philippine independence came on July 4, 1946.

==== Hawaii ====
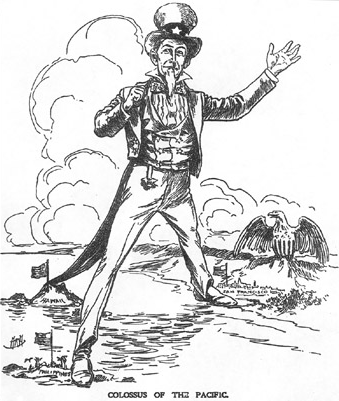
Colossus of the Pacific : Uncle Sam standing over US Pacific possessions, after the style of the iconic cartoon of Rhodes

In the 1800s the US became concerned that Great Britain or France might have colonial ambitions for the Hawaiian Kingdom. In 1849 the US and the Kingdom signed a friendship treaty. In 1885, King David Kalākaua, Hawaii's last king, signed a treaty with the US allowing tariff-free sugar exports to the US mainland. On July 6, 1887, the Hawaiian League, an illegal secret society, threatened the king and forced him to enact a new constitution that stripped him of much of his power. King Kalākaua died in 1891 and was succeeded by his sister Queen Lili'uokalani. In 1893 with support from marines from the USS Boston, the Queen was deposed in a bloodless coup. Hawaii became a US territory and later became the 50th US state in 1959.

Congress' procedure for annexing territory was explained in an 1898 report by the Senate Foreign Relations Committee in the context of Hawaii: "If, in the judgment of Congress, such a measure is supported by a safe and wise policy, or is based upon a natural duty that we owe to the people of Hawaii, or is necessary for our national development and security, that is enough to justify annexation, with the consent of the recognized government of the country to be annexed."

=== 1912–1920: Wilson's interventions ===
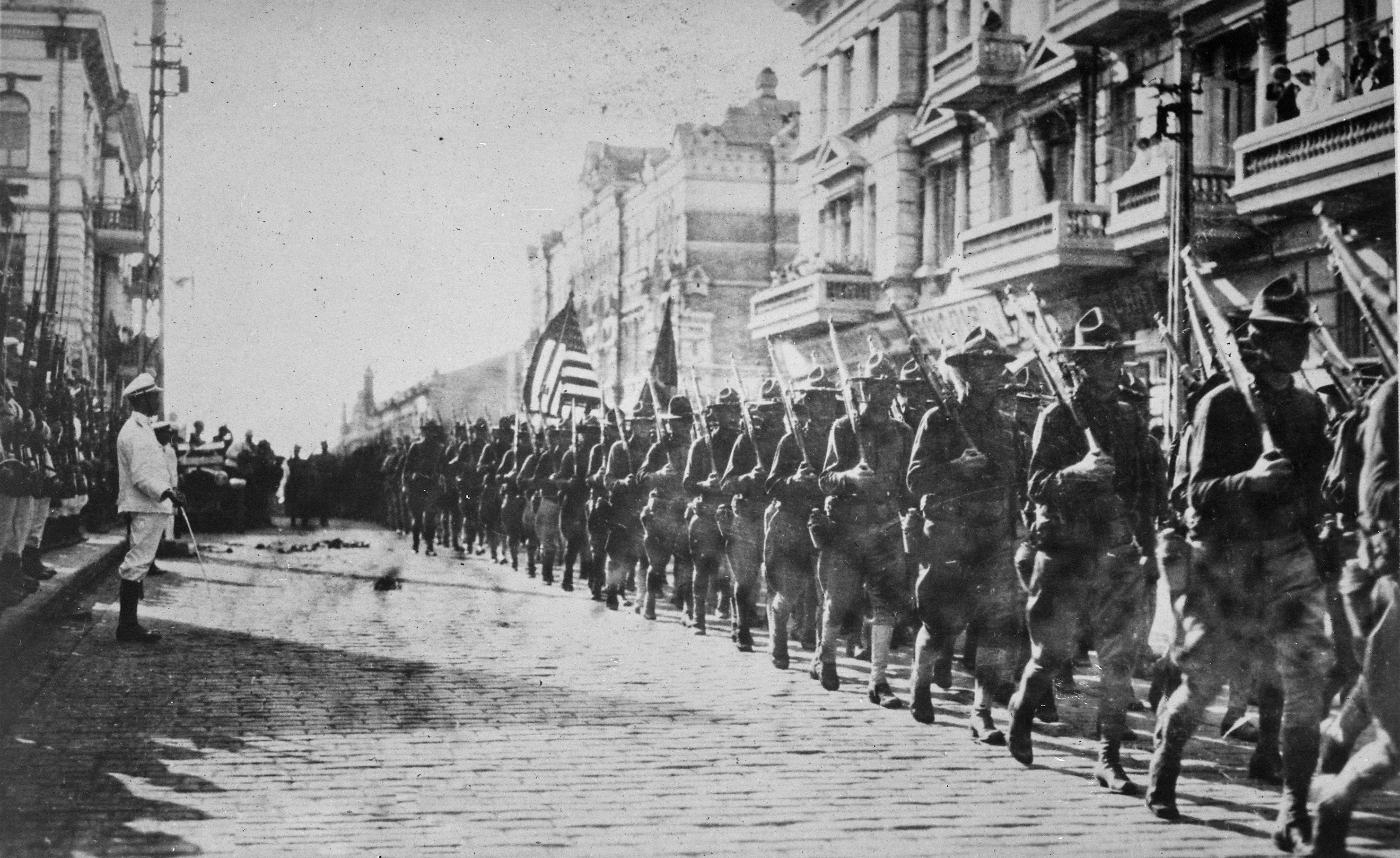
American troops marching in Vladivostok during the Allied intervention in the Russian Civil War, August 1918

President Woodrow Wilson launched seven overseas armed interventions (Nicaragua, the Dominican Republic, Haiti, Cuba, Panama, Mexico and Honduras), more than any other president. General Smedley Butler, the most-decorated Marine of that era, considered virtually all of the operations to have been economically motivated. In a 1933 speech he averred:

I was a racketeer, a gangster for capitalism. I suspected I was just part of a racket at the time. Now I am sure of it...I helped make Mexico, especially Tampico, safe for American oil interests in 1914. I helped make Haiti and Cuba a decent place for the National City Bank boys to collect revenues in. I helped in the raping of half a dozen Central American republics for the benefits of Wall Street ... Looking back on it, I feel that I could have given Al Capone a few hints. The best he could do was to operate his racket in three districts. I operated on three continents.

The US invaded Haiti on July 28, 1915, and administered it until 1934. Haiti had been independent before the intervention. The Haitian government agreed to US terms, including American oversight.

=== 1920s–1930s ===
By the 1930s, Standard Oil of California (SOCAL) had made a series of acquisitions, which achieved decades-long control over Saudi oil.

=== 1941–1945: World War II ===
At the start of World War II, the US administered multiple Pacific territories. The majority of these territories hosted military bases, such as Midway, Guam, Wake Island, and Hawaii. Japan's surprise attack on Pearl Harbor brought the US into the war. Japan occupied Guam, Wake Island, and other American territories. By early 1942 Japan had conquered the Philippines. Many battles were needed to retake allied territory and other Japanese-occupied territories. The US liberated the Philippines; Japanese troops surrendered in August 1945. The maximum extension of American direct control came after the war, and included the occupations of Germany and Austria in May and Japan and Korea in September 1945.

==== Grand Area concept ====
The US began planning for the post-war world at the war's outset. This vision originated in the Council on Foreign Relations (CFR), an economic organization that worked closely with government leaders. CFR's War and Peace Studies group offered its services to the State Department in 1939 and a secret partnership developed. CFR leaders Hamilton Fish Armstrong and Walter H. Mallory saw World War II as a "grand opportunity" for the US to emerge as "the premier power in the world".

In an October 1940 report to President Roosevelt, geographer Isaiah Bowman, a key liaison between the CFR and the State Department, wrote, "...the US government is interested in any solution anywhere in the world that affects American trade. In a wide sense, commerce is the mother of all wars." In 1942 this economic globalism was articulated as the "Grand Area" concept in secret documents. Under that policy the US would have sought control over the "Western Hemisphere, Continental Europe and Mediterranean Basin (excluding Russia), the Pacific Area and the Far East, and the British Empire (excluding Canada)." The Grand Area encompassed all known major oil-bearing areas outside the Soviet Union.

Better than the American Century or the Pax Americana, the notion of an American Lebensraum captures the specific and global historical geography of U.S. ascension to power. After World War II, global power would no longer be measured in terms of colonized land or power over territory. Rather, global power was measured in directly economic terms. Trade and markets now figured as the economic nexuses of global power, a shift confirmed in the 1944 Bretton Woods agreement, which not only inaugurated an international currency system but also established two central banking institutions—the International Monetary Fund and the World Bank—to oversee the global economy. These represented the first planks of the economic infrastructure of the postwar American Lebensraum.

— Neil Smith

=== Cold War ===
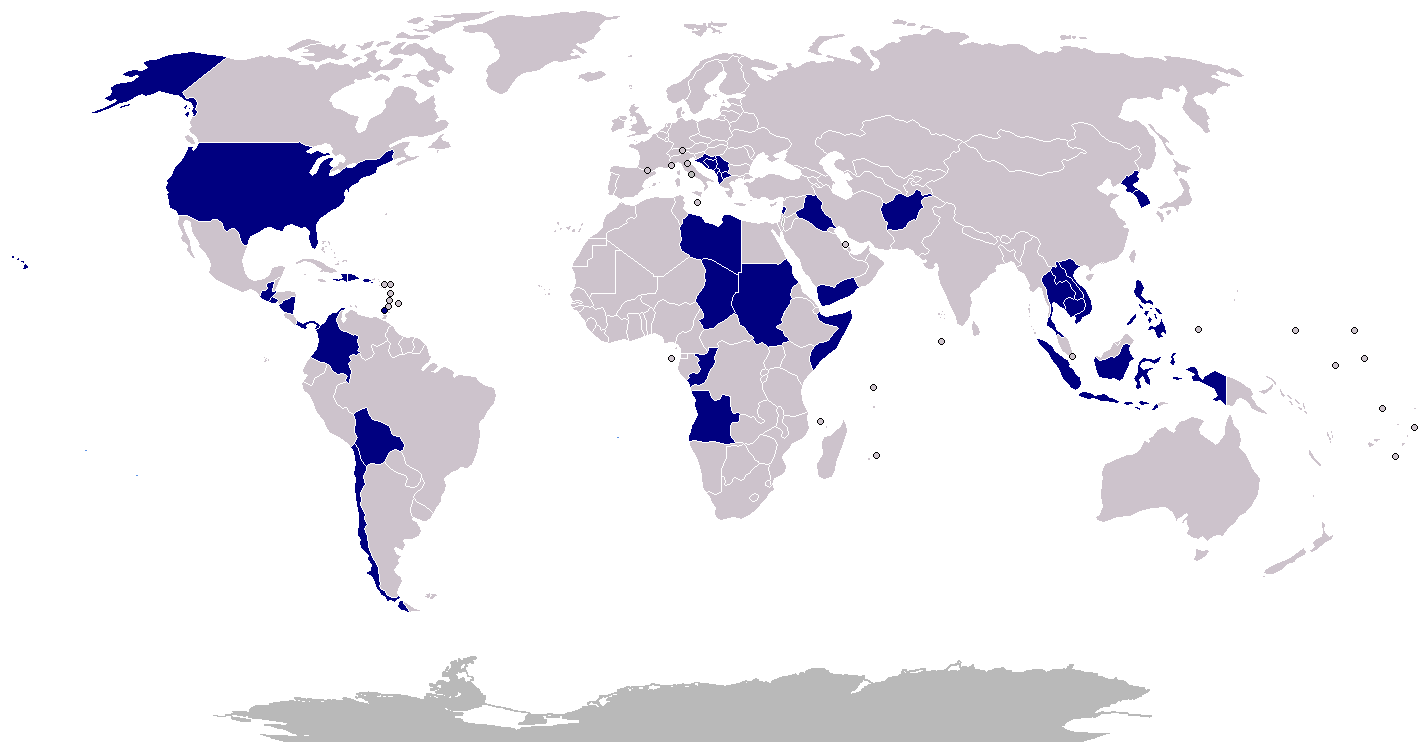
Military interventions since WW2 to 2007 shown in blue. Does not include weapons provided via Lend-Lease or diplomacy.

While its economic ascent began in the early 20th century, World War II established the U.S. as the dominant force in global capitalism, rivaled only by the Soviet-led bloc. Political economist Adam Hanieh states that the devastation of Western Europe and the collapse of colonial empires allowed the U.S. to architect a new post-war order, centered on a dollar-anchored financial system. By the mid-1950s, this hegemony was evidenced by the U.S. controlling 60% of world manufacturing and 25% of global GDP, while housing 42 of the world's 50 largest industrial corporations.

Hanieh writes that, in the post-WWII era, the global capitalist system was destabilized by a wave of decolonization movements that swept through Africa, Asia, and Latin America. Political scientist Michael Parenti argues that the U.S. launched a global "counter-revolution" to suppress the rise of revolutionary nationalist governments in the Third World, involving direct military interventions, coups, funding opposition movements, and the training of military forces. Historian Dov H. Levin notes that, between 1946 and 2000, the U.S. interfered in the elections of 81 countries. Furthermore, the U.S. and the U.K. actively backed fundamentalist Islamist movements throughout the Middle East, North Africa, and Central and South Asia. These movements were seen as a strategic buffer against Soviet influence and a counterforce to nationalist and socialist movements. This policy was formalized at the highest levels: in 1957, President Eisenhower approved a policy to "do everything possible to stress the 'holy war' aspect". Decades later, Saudi Crown Prince Mohammed bin Salman acknowledged this cold-war policy, noting in 2018 that Saudi Arabia's International propagation of the Wahhabi/Salafi movement was "rooted in the Cold War, when allies asked Saudi Arabia to use its resources to prevent inroads in Muslim countries by the Soviet Union."

A 1949 U.S. National Security Council study stated that the U.S. should find ways of "exerting economic pressures" on countries that do not accept their assigned role as suppliers of "strategic commodities and other basic materials". Linguist Noam Chomsky argued in Middle East Illusions (2003) that, following World War II, the U.S. sought to reestablish the former colonized world as a service appendage to the global capitalist system where each region was allocated a specific "function" for the "welfare of the global capitalist system". Chomsky states that policy documents framed the main danger as "economic nationalism"—also labeled "radical" or "ultra-nationalism". According to Chomsky, such developments were viewed as unacceptable by the U.S. and had to be curbed and instead the principal beneficiaries must be U.S. investors and their international partners, who seek an investment-friendly environment offering favorable terms and unrestricted access to labor and raw materials. William Blum argues that US interventions were primarily driven by economic interests. According to Blum, in almost all U.S. interventions in the Third World since World War II, the target was overthrowing "a policy of 'self-determination': the desire, born of perceived need and principle, to pursue a path of development independent of US foreign policy objectives." Thomas L. Friedman argued in a 1999 op ed that the "hidden hand" of the market requires a "hidden fist" to function, noting that "McDonald's cannot flourish without McDonnell Douglas" and that the global success of Silicon Valley is ultimately secured by the "US Army, Air Force, Navy and Marine Corps."

According to Sociologist Christopher Doran of the University of Indiana, following the quadrupling of oil prices as a result of the 1973 oil crisis, the massive surge of petrodollars into the U.S. financial system provided the capital for a wave of international lending. Many developing countries required these loans to cover trade deficits caused by the very same spike of oil prices that had generated the petrodollar surplus. This cycle led to a debt-driven explosion; according to the International Monetary Fund (IMF), the foreign debt of 100 non-oil-exporting developing nations surged by 150% between 1973 and 1977. This indebtedness turned into a full-scale crisis following the 1979 "Volcker shock," when high U.S. interest rates made repayments unsustainable. These debts were owed to the World Bank, the IMF, and major New York banks, which had recently been deregulated following the collapse of the Bretton Woods system. To avoid total bankruptcy, according to Doran, these developing countries accepted "bailout" packages, called structural adjustment programs, conditioned on neoliberal reforms, including privatization, deregulation, and drastic cuts to public spending. The forced sale of state assets allowed U.S. and other Western corporations to acquire resources at deeply discounted prices, leading to immediate gains for their shareholders. Ultimately, these structural adjustment programs served as a primary mechanism for American dominance over a global economy transitioning toward neoliberalism. The scale of this wealth transfer was immense: by 2004, the world's poorest countries had paid an estimated $4.6 trillion in debt service to the wealthiest nations, particularly the U.S.

==== Europe ====
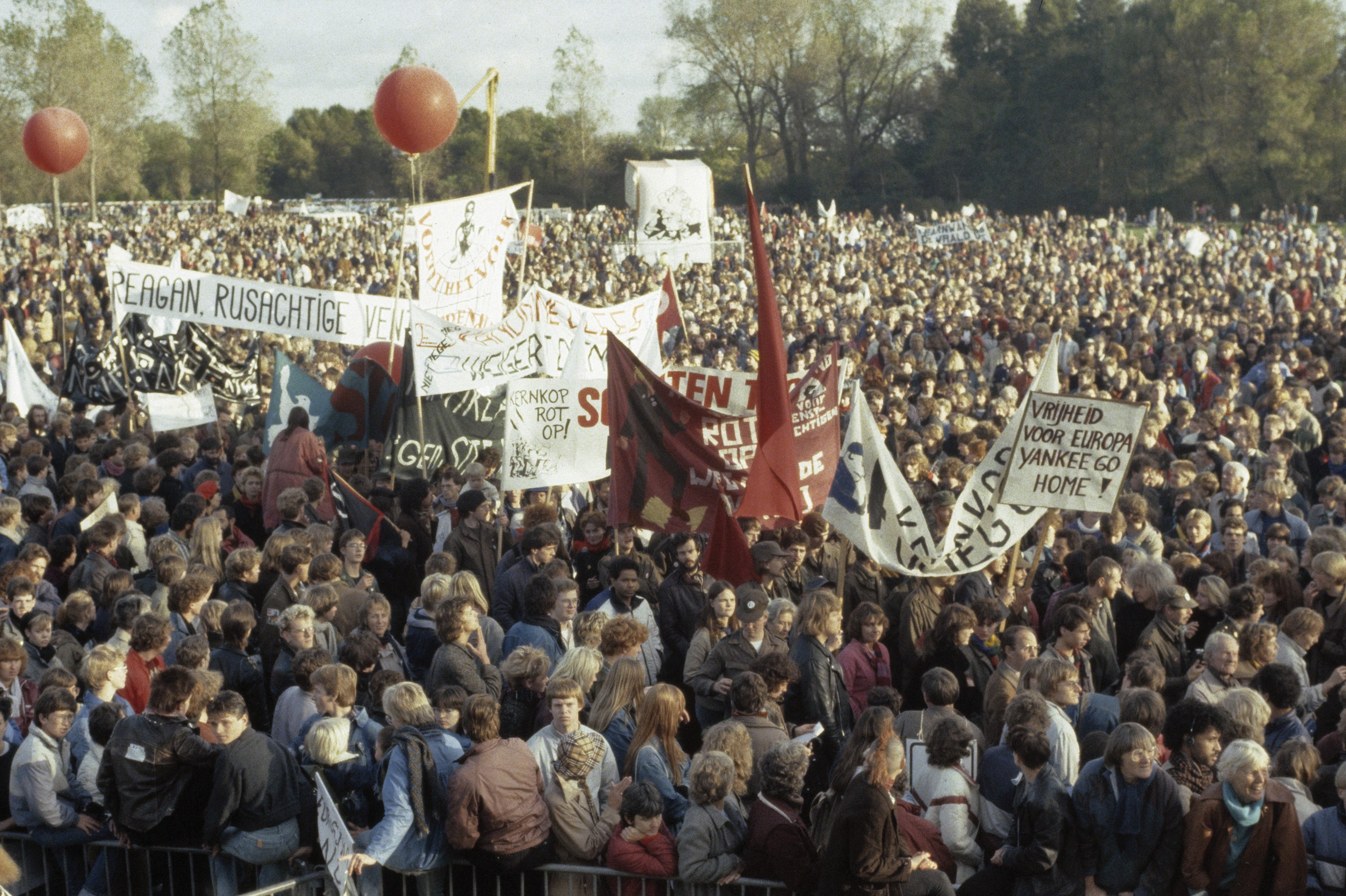
Protest against the deployment of Pershing II missiles in Europe, The Hague, Netherlands, 1983

Prior to his death in 1945, President Roosevelt was planning to withdraw all US forces from Europe. Soviet actions in Poland and Czechoslovakia led his successor Harry Truman to reconsider. Heavily influenced by George Kennan, Washington policymakers decided that the Soviet Union was an expansionary dictatorship that threatened the free world. In their view, Moscow's weakness was that it had to keep expanding to survive; and that, by containing or stopping its growth, European stability could be achieved. The result was the Truman Doctrine (1947). Initially regarding only Greece and Turkey, NSC-68 (1951) extended it to the entire non-Communist world. Thus, the Truman Doctrine was described as globalizing the Monroe Doctrine.

A second consideration was the need to restore the world economy, which required rebuilding Europe and Japan. This was the main rationale for the 1948 Marshall Plan.

Europe's requirements for the next three or four years of foreign food and other essential products... are so much greater than her present ability to pay that she must have substantial additional help or face economic, social, and political deterioration of a very grave character.

— George C. Marshall

A third factor was the acceptance, especially by Britain and Benelux, that American military involvement was needed to contain the USSR.

==== Latin America ====
American involvement in Panama began as a result of its interest in building a canal there, and led to its support for Panamanian independence (from Colombia) in 1903. The US funded the construction and maintained ownership of the Panama Canal Zone until President Carter ceded it to Panama as of the end of 1999. After an attack on the US Embassy in mid-1987, the indictment of Panama's dictator Manuel Noriega on drug charges, and Noriega's annulment of the 1989 election (alleging US fraud), the US invaded and deposed and arrested him, withdrawing its forces the following month. Some of the ports on either end of the canal were then purchased by Chinese company Hutchison Whampoa, before Black Rock purchased the rights following President Trump's objections to its continued ownership.

Following the Guatemalan Revolution, Guatemala expanded labor rights and land reforms that granted property to landless peasants. Lobbying by the United Fruit Company, whose profits were damaged by these policies, as well as fear of Communist influence, culminated in US support for Operation PBFortune to overthrow Guatemalan President Jacobo Árbenz in 1952. The US provided weapons to exiled Guatemalan military officer Carlos Castillo Armas, who was to lead an invasion from Nicaragua. This culminated in the 1954 Guatemalan coup d'état. The subsequent military junta assumed dictatorial powers, banned opposition parties and reversed the social reforms. After the coup, American influence grew in the country, in the government and the economy. The US continued to support Guatemala throughout the Cold War, including during the Guatemalan genocide in which up to 200,000 people were killed.

==== Middle East ====
Map of oil and natural gas in the Middle East

According to political scientist Dore Gold, in the Middle East and North Africa, socialist Arab nationalism—headlined by Nasserism in Egypt and competing Ba’athist factions in Syria and Iraq—exerted a profound ideological influence across the Arab World. The movement for pan-Arab unity under Nasser's leadership intensified, reaching its zenith with the formation of the United Arab Republic—a political union with Syria that lasted from 1958 to 1961. According to Adam Hanieh, Arab nationalists frequently collided with imperialist agendas, most notably through the toppling of colonial-backed monarchies and the nationalization of the Suez Canal. These acts of defiance, alongside regional confrontations with Israel, fostered intense pride and solidarity across the Arab World. According to historian Victor McFarland, the Dwight D. Eisenhower administration feared Nasser’s Arab nationalism would spark uprisings against conservative regimes in the Middle East and jeopardize Western oil access. Nasser's nationalization of the Suez Canal and his call to use oil against Israel and the West sparked concerns over future oil nationalization. Intervening militarily to support Lebanon’s conservative regime, Eisenhower told Nixon that Nasser threatened “vitally needed petroleum supplies” and, by controlling the region's oil, would hold “the income and the power to destroy the Western world.” Consequently, Chomsky identifies Israel as "a crucial part of the elaborate U.S. base and backup system for the Rapid Deployment Force [the precursor to CENTCOM] ringing the Middle East oil producing regions."

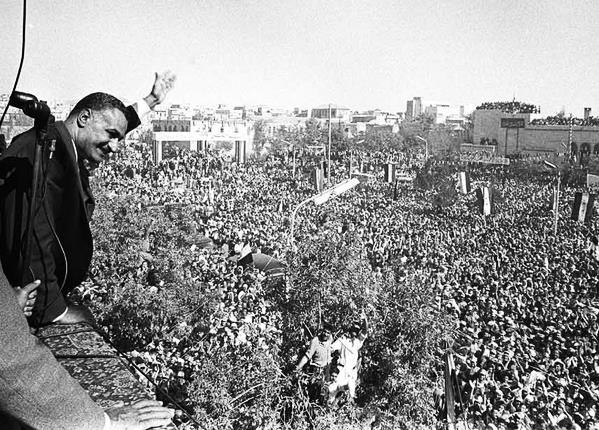
Nasser addressing the crowds in Hama in 1960

According to a 1956 State Department Memorandum of a Conference, Eisenhower believed that "we should work toward building up King Saud as a major figure in the Middle Eastern area." John Foster Dulles, U.S. secretary of state under Eisenhower, viewed King Saud of Saudi Arabia as "the only figure in the area with sufficient presence and potential assets to serve as a counterpoise to Nasser." An internal U.S. State Department memo reporting a meeting between Eisenhower, Dulles and the Joint Chiefs of Staff in 1957 stated the following:

The President said he thought we should do everything possible to stress the "holy war" aspect. Mr. Dulles commented that if the Arabs have a "holy war" they would want it to be against Israel. The President recalled, however, that Saud, after his visit here, had called on all Arabs to oppose Communism.

The U.S.-backed, Saudi-led conservative monarchies established an alliance to suppress the influence of the Egypt-led secular socialist Arab nationalist republics through both direct and indirect means. This regional ideological and political rivalry, dubbed the Arab Cold War by political scientist Malcolm H. Kerr, was militarized through proxy warfare which pitted the conservative monarchies against the revolutionary republics in a violent contest for regional dominance.

Rashid Khalidi observes that the Arab nationalist wave "seemed to place the United States and its allies in a highly unfavorable position. To this apparently unbalanced situation, Saudi Arabia brought the powerful ideological weapon of Islam." In 2018, Mohammed bin Salman, the de facto ruler of Saudi Arabia, said that Saudi Arabia's international propagation of Wahhabism campaign was "rooted in the Cold War, when allies asked Saudi Arabia to use its resources to prevent inroads in Muslim countries by the Soviet Union."

While ideological efforts were ongoing, it was military might that ultimately broke the back of the Arab nationalist movement. The 1967 Six-Day War, initiated with Israeli surprise airstrikes against Egyptian airfields, dealt a fatal blow to secular Arab nationalism, as the humiliating defeat of Egypt and its allies shattered Nasser’s revolutionary legitimacy.

===== Saudi Arabia =====
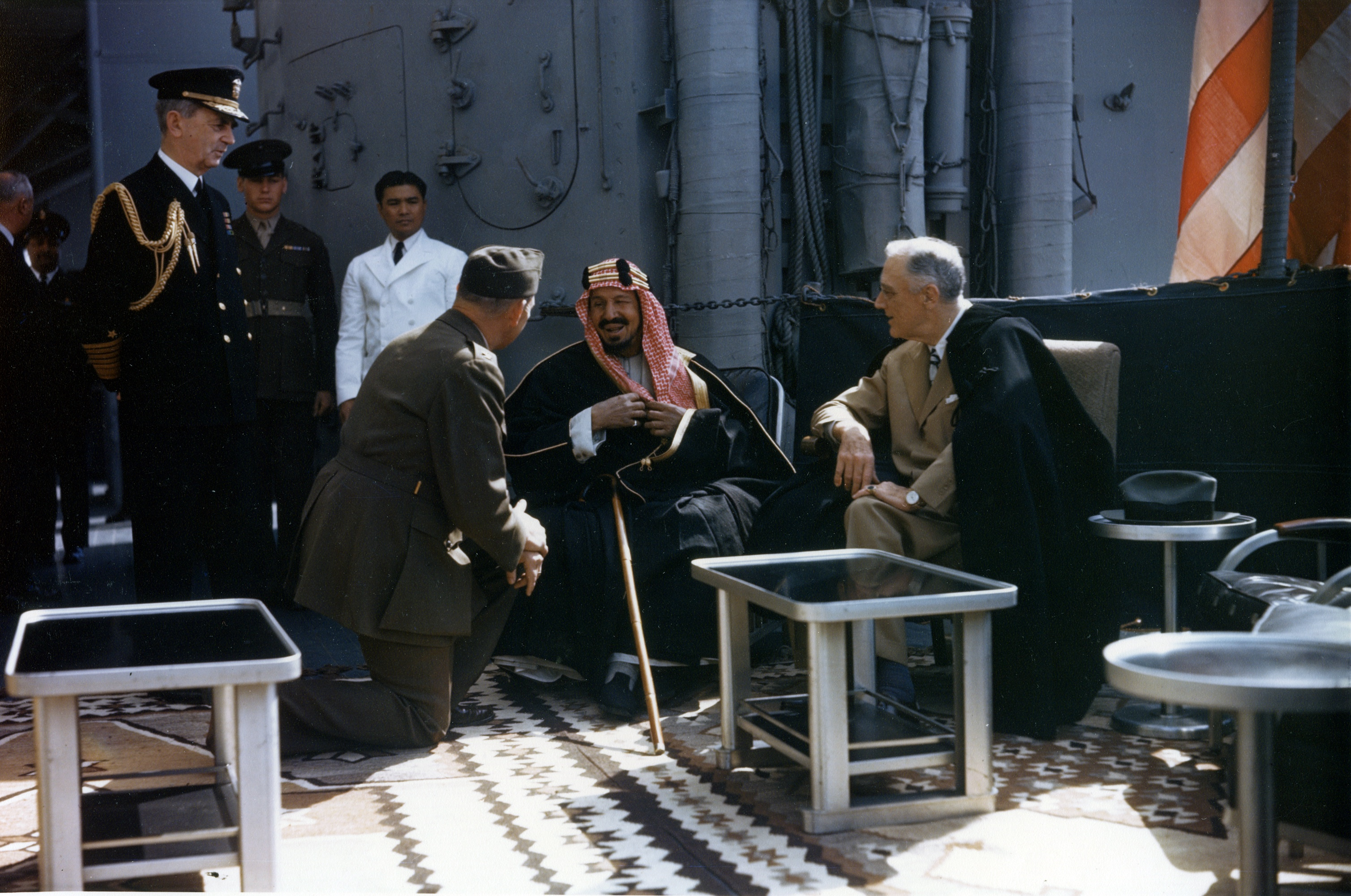
King Ibn Saud converses with President Franklin D. Roosevelt on board the USS Quincy, February 1945

A U.S. State Department analysis concluded that Saudi Arabia's oil resources "constitute a stupendous source of strategic power, and one of the greatest material prizes in world history". In 1943, U.S. President Franklin D. Roosevelt stated that "the defense of Saudi Arabia is vital to the defense of the United States." In 1980, President Carter told a joint session of Congress that "An attempt by any outside force to gain control of the Persian Gulf region will be regarded as an assault on the vital interests of the United States of America."

Samir Amin observes that the strategic importance of Middle Eastern oil has historically been viewed as a critical source of global geopolitical leverage. National Security Advisor Zbigniew Brzezinski contended that given the dependence of Western Europe and East Asia on Middle Eastern oil, Soviet domination of the region would have enabled the Soviets to "blackmail" both regions, forcing them into diplomatic accommodations on favorable terms. Former Central Intelligence Agency (CIA) intelligence analyst Kenneth M. Pollack echoed this position, stating that the U.S. seeks more than just the continuous flow of Persian Gulf oil; it also aims to prevent any hostile actor from dominating the region's resources to build a power base or exert global "blackmail." In 1990, Secretary of Defense Dick Cheney testified before the Senate Armed Services Committee that anyone controlling the flow of Middle Eastern oil would possess a "stranglehold" over the U.S. economy, as well as "on that of most of the other nations of the world as well". Chomsky argued that by controlling Middle Eastern oil, the U.S. gains a strategic stranglehold that allows it to effectively "blackmail" industrial rivals; he identifies this strategy of keeping Europe and East Asia dependent on corporate America as "one of the main reasons the United States has been so interested in Middle Eastern oil." He added, "We didn't need the oil for ourselves;" until the early 1970s "North America led the world in oil production. But we do want to keep our hands on this lever of world power," further, a secondary objective is to ensure that "the flow of petrodollars should be largely funnelled to the U.S. through military purchases, construction projects, bank deposits, investment in Treasury securities, etc."

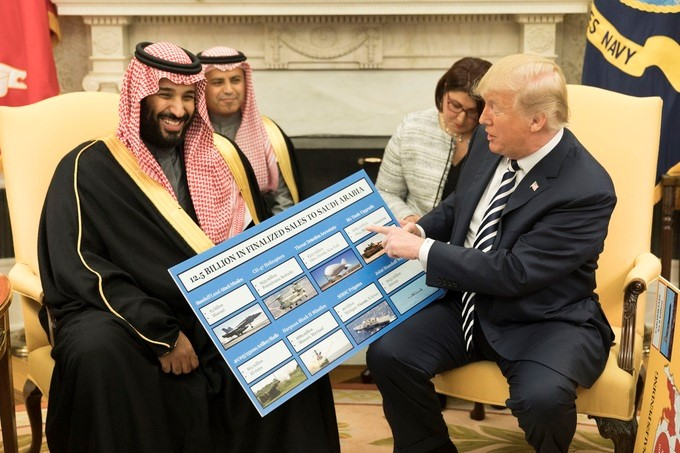
President Donald J. Trump, joined by Crown Prince of Saudi Arabia Mohammed bin Salman, shows informational boards showing how much business the Kingdom of Saudi Arabia generates in the United States economy, at their meeting in the Oval Office at the White House, Tuesday, March 20, 2018, in Washington, D.C.

Energy analysts Edward L. Morse and James Richard identify Saudi Arabia's oil spare capacity as a fundamental pillar of the U.S.–Saudi partnership. This was demonstrated most clearly during the Cold War. In the mid-1980s, according to Christopher M. Davidson, just as the Soviet oil industry sought to expand, Saudi Arabia utilized its spare capacity, at the request of CIA Director William J. Casey, to crash global oil prices to $10 a barrel—a drop of more than 50%. This Saudi-engineered price collapse led to the implosion of the Soviet oil industry, which in turn accelerated the eventual dissolution of the Soviet Union. A former CIA chief of staff later characterized the maneuver as "body blow to the Soviets. It was the equivalent of stepping on their oxygen tube." Morse and Richard describe Saudi oil spare capacity as "the energy equivalent of nuclear weapons", serving as the bedrock of American oil policy.

Immanuel Ness argues that, by manipulating prices—a tactic seen as early as President Richard Nixon's management of the 1973 oil crisis—the U.S. can exert deleterious economic pressure on any oil import-dependent nation. Ultimately, managing world oil prices through the dominance of the global currency allows the U.S. to maintain a level of control over the economies of Europe, China, Russia, and any other potential challengers to its hegemony. A cornerstone of the global financial system is the strategic partnership between the U.S. and Gulf monarchies, particularly Saudi Arabia. In exchange for security guarantees, Saudi Arabia agreed to price oil exclusively in U.S. dollars—displacing British sterling and establishing the dollar as the primary international reserve currency. This "petrodollar" arrangement required all nations to maintain significant dollar holdings for energy imports, granting the U.S. "exorbitant privilege": the ability to finance persistent deficits with minimal inflationary pressure, while providing geopolitical leverage through the power to impose financial sanctions and exclude rivals from the dollar-based clearing system. A critical mechanism of this structure is the "recycling" of petrodollar wealth back into American financial markets. Through a series of bilateral agreements, Saudi oil revenues were channeled into U.S. Treasury securities. Additionally, the Gulf region became a primary market for U.S. military exports, establishing a durable economic and military dependency that persists today.

===== Israel =====
U.S. officials and military leaders have long characterized Israel an indispensable strategic asset for maintaining regional dominance. A 1958 National security council memorandum, since declassified, observed that "if we choose to combat radical Arab nationalism and to hold Persian Gulf oil by force if necessary, a logical corollary would be to support Israel as the only strong pro-West power left in the Near East." In 1986, then-Senator Joe Biden asserted that Israel "is the best $3 billion investment we make. If there weren't an Israel, the United States of America would have to invent an Israel to protect her interests in the region." General George J. Keegan Jr., a former chief of US Air Force Intelligence, was quoted by the journalist Wolf Blitzer in 1985 as valuing the Israeli intelligence provided to the United States at "five CIAs".

Chomsky contends that the U.S. views Israel as a strategic asset vital for securing its interests in the Middle East—chiefly the control of oil and petrodollar flows, while also protecting U.S.-backed autocratic Arab regimes and simultaneously acting as a constant deterrent to them to ensure these regimes remain aligned with U.S. policy.

===== Iran =====
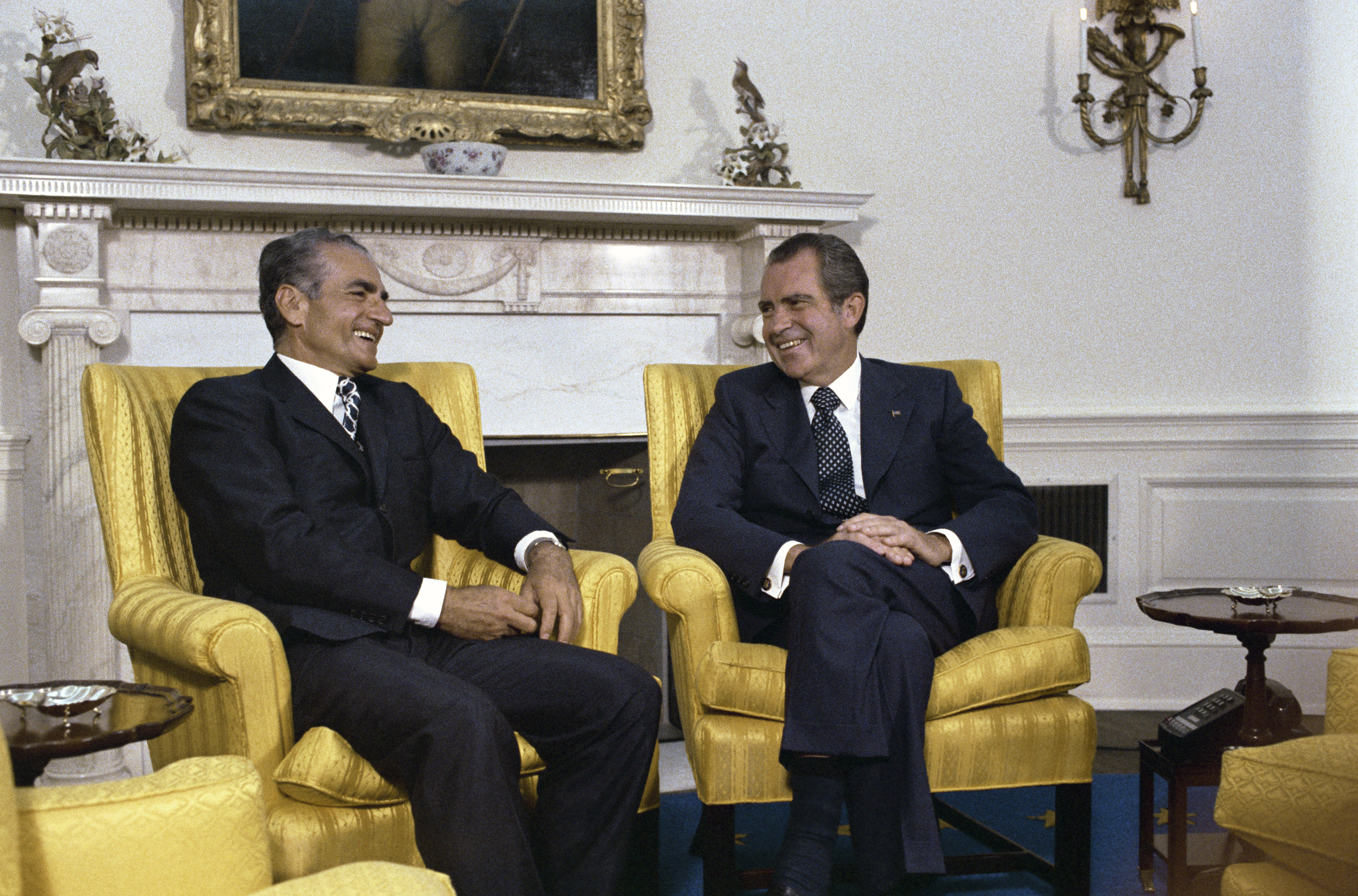
Shah Reza Pahlavi speaks with U.S. President Richard Nixon in the Oval Office, 1973

On March 15, 1951, the Iranian parliament passed legislation proposed by Mohammad Mosaddegh to nationalize the Anglo-Persian Oil Company, whose revenues from Iranian oil were greater than the Iranian government budget. Mosaddegh was elected Prime Minister by the Majlis. Mosadeggh's support by the Tudeh as well as a boycott by various businesses against the nationalized industry produced fears in the UK and the US that Iran would turn to Communism. America officially remained neutral, but the CIA covertly supported various candidates in the 1952 Iranian legislative election.

In late 1952, with Mosaddegh in power, the CIA launched a coup via Operation Ajax with UK support. The coup increased the monarchy's power. In the aftermath of the coup, Shah Reza Pahlavi replaced the Anglo-Iranian Oil Company with a consortium of BP and eight European and American oil companies. In 1979, the Iranian Revolution ended the rule of the Shah and American influence in the country. In August 2013, the US formally acknowledged its role in the coup, including bribing Iranian politicians, security, and army officials, as well as pro-coup propaganda.

=== 1945–1970: Asia-Pacific ===
==== Japan ====
The US occupied Japan after WWII until 1952, and maintained control of Okinawa Prefecture until 1972, before returning control to Japan.

==== Korea ====
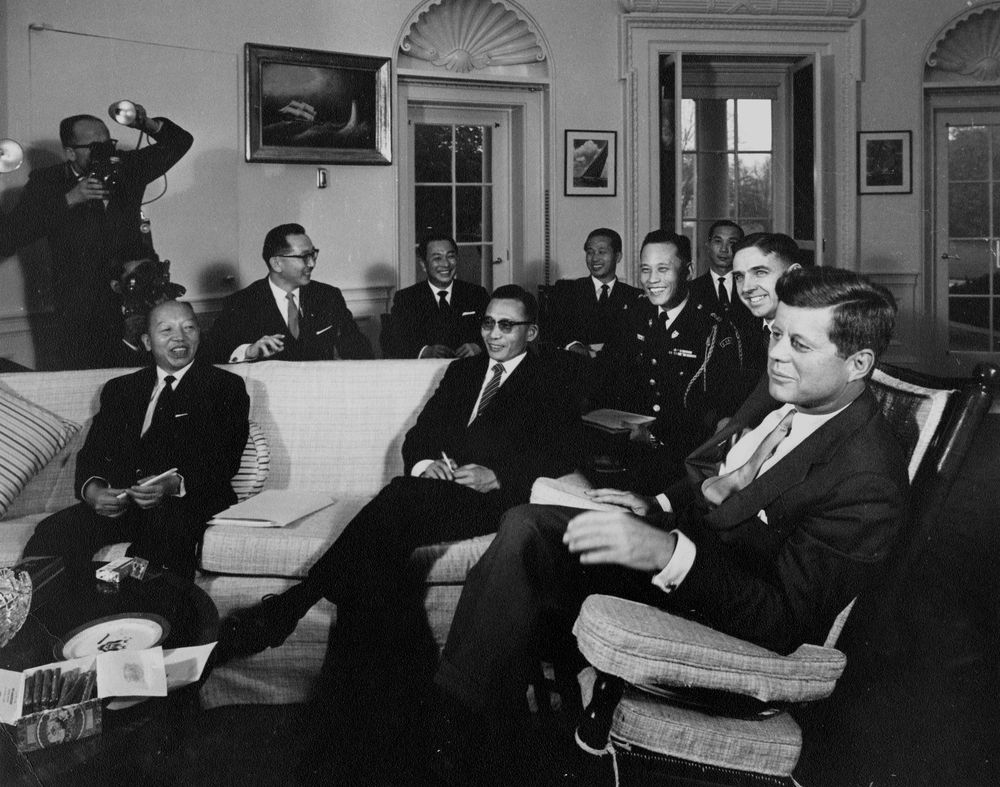
South Korean leader Park Chung Hee with U.S. President John F. Kennedy in Washington, D.C. on November 14, 1961

After Japan surrendered the land they had ruled since 1910, the US and the USSR divided the Korean peninsula along the 38th parallel, with the Southern end occupied by the US and the Northern end by the USSR. The United States Army Military Government in Korea (USAMGIK) banned strikes on December 8 and outlawed the PRK Revolutionary Government and People's Committees on December 12. Following further unrest, the USAMGIK declared martial law.

The UN decided to hold an election to create an independent Korea. However, the Soviets and Korean Communists refused to participate due to concerns about division caused by an election without North Korea's participation, many South Korean politicians boycotted it., the Communist North invaded the South in June 1950, launching the bloody Korean War. North Korea was supported by China and the Soviet Union, while South Korea was supported by the United Nations led by the United States under the auspices of the United Nations Command (UNC). The conflict was one of the first major proxy wars of the Cold War and one of its deadliest conflicts on noncombatants, as it is estimated that 1.5 to 3 million civilians were killed during the war. Based on National Security Council document 68, the US adopted a policy of "rollback" against Communism in Asia.

==== Vietnam ====
The US initially supported France's counterinsurgency program, but not its continued rule. US support was in response to China's support for Vietnam's communists. After Điện Biên Phủ, the US pressured France to free the pro-French government. The US assumed military and financial support for South Vietnam following France's defeat in the First Indochina War. The US and South Vietnam refused to sign agreements at the 1954 Geneva Conference arguing that fair elections weren't possible in North Vietnam. Beginning in 1965, the US sent forces to protect the South from invasions by the North and local insurgencies. In part the Vietnam War was a proxy war between the USSR and the US. The Paris Peace accords triggered the departure of US troops by March 1973, while 150,000-200,000 Northern soldiers remained in the South in violation of the accords. Peace continued until the US slashed aid to the South by 70% in 1974. The North launched its final offensive in March 1975, and Saigon fell on April 30.

==== Indonesia ====
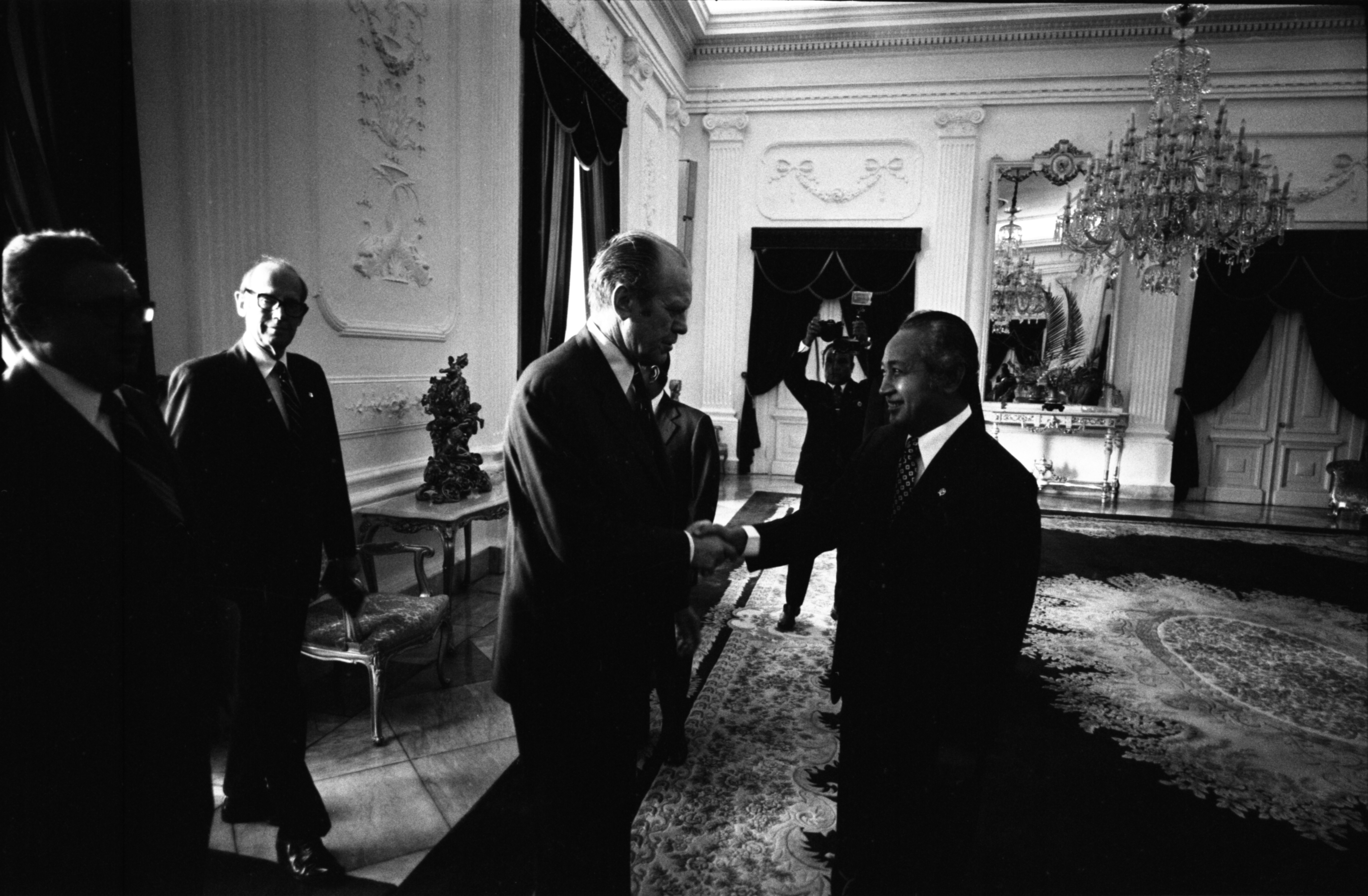
Indonesian President Suharto with U.S. President Gerald Ford in Jakarta on December 6, 1975, one day before the Indonesian invasion of East Timor

After the murder of six Indonesian Army generals, which Suharto blamed on the Communist Party of Indonesia and a failed coup attempt by the 30 September Movement, he began an anti-communist purge, ultimately killing up to one million. Ethnic Chinese, trade unionists, teachers, activists, artists, ethnic Javanese Abangan, ethnic Chinese, atheists, so-called "unbelievers", and alleged leftists were targeted. Historians and journalists have documented that the US, UK, and their allies, were essential in facilitating and encouraging the campaign. The campaign purged the Communist Party, and shifted Indonesia towards the West. American trade expanded. By 1967, companies such as Freeport Sulphur (see Grasberg mine), Goodyear Tire and Rubber Company, General Electric, American Express, Caterpillar Inc., StarKist, Raytheon Technologies and Lockheed Martin, began to explore business opportunities. Declassified documents released in October 2017 stated that the US government had detailed knowledge of the massacres. Commenting on the documents, historian Bradley Simpson said these previously secret cables, telegrams, letters, and reports "contain damning details that the U.S. was willfully and gleefully pushing for the mass murder of innocent people."

=== 1970s–1980s: Latin American regime change ===
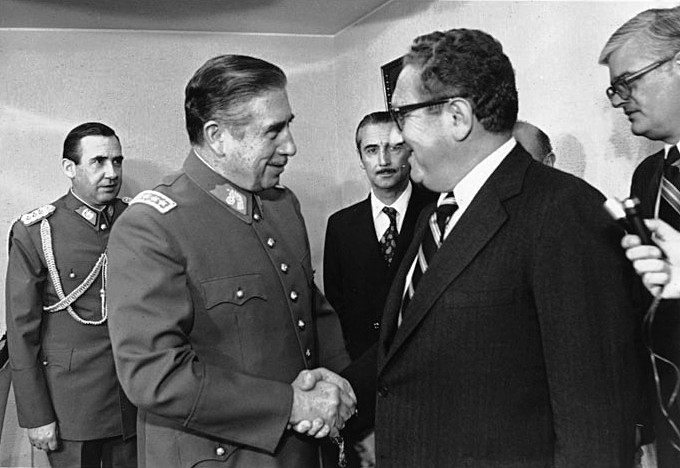
Chilean leader Augusto Pinochet shaking hands with Henry Kissinger in 1976

From 1968 through 1989, the US supported attempts to defeat left-wing insurgencies and governments. It supported political repression and state terrorism including intelligence operations, coup d'états, and assassinations as part of Operation Condor. It began in November 1975, led by the dictatorships of the Southern Cone of South America in Argentina, Bolivia, Brazil, Chile, Ecuador, Paraguay, Peru, and Uruguay.

=== Post-Cold War ===
According to Eric Toussaint of the Committee for the Abolition of Illegitimate Debt, the International Monetary Fund (IMF), the World Bank, and the World Trade Organization (WTO) serve as the primary agents in auditing and reshaping the internal economic landscapes of the Global South. Marxist geographer David Harvey sees that the systematic seizure of wealth, or accumulation by dispossession, is executed by the IMF and WTO through the forced liberalization of world markets as part of what he calls a “new imperialism”. These institutions, he says, exert the necessary pressure to dismantle economic barriers, a process consistently reinforced by U.S. interventions. Sociologist and activist Walden Bello contends that neoliberalism promoted by the U.S., the World Bank, and the IMF in the Third World aims to weaken producers by removing protectionist barriers to Western imports, eliminating regulations on foreign investment, eroding labor protections, and integrating the local economies into a Western-dominated global system. In 2000, the UN Sub-Commission on the Promotion and Protection of Human Rights declared that the WTO's rules are fundamentally unfair and predicated on a false premise of equality between trading partners. By ignoring the dominance of powerful multinational enterprises, it said, the system serves to reinforce existing corporatist monopolies.American sociologist and activist Christopher Doran, writing in 2012, argued that the U.S. has promoted neoliberalism domestically and internationally "to restore the class power to the uber-wealthy and take back the gains they had lost under Keynesianism and its government-focused policies of wealth distribution." Richard Peet observes that the Washington Consensus promoted by the 'Unholy Trinity'—IMF, World Bank and WTO—has:

[E]stablished, protected and reinforced a neoliberal policy regime that served to deregulate the world economy (in terms of national state intervention), freeing the way for global, and particularly US, corporations, the trading of industrial commodities without interference, and the movement of capital assets across national boundaries that have been reduced in significance.

==== Gulf War ====
In 1991 the US and allies invaded Iraq to force it to withdraw from Kuwait, which Iraq had conquered the year before. The Gulf War lasted 9 days before the two parties accepted a ceasefire and Iraq withdrew its forces. The Bush Administration noted that possession of Kuwait would give Iraq control of 45% of global oil production. While the US gained no direct control of territory or (oil or other) assets, it strengthened relations with Kuwait and neighboring countries (save for Iran).

==== Global War on Terrorism (GWOT) ====
Countries with Central Intelligence Agency (CIA) secret prisons. (known as extraordinary rendition)

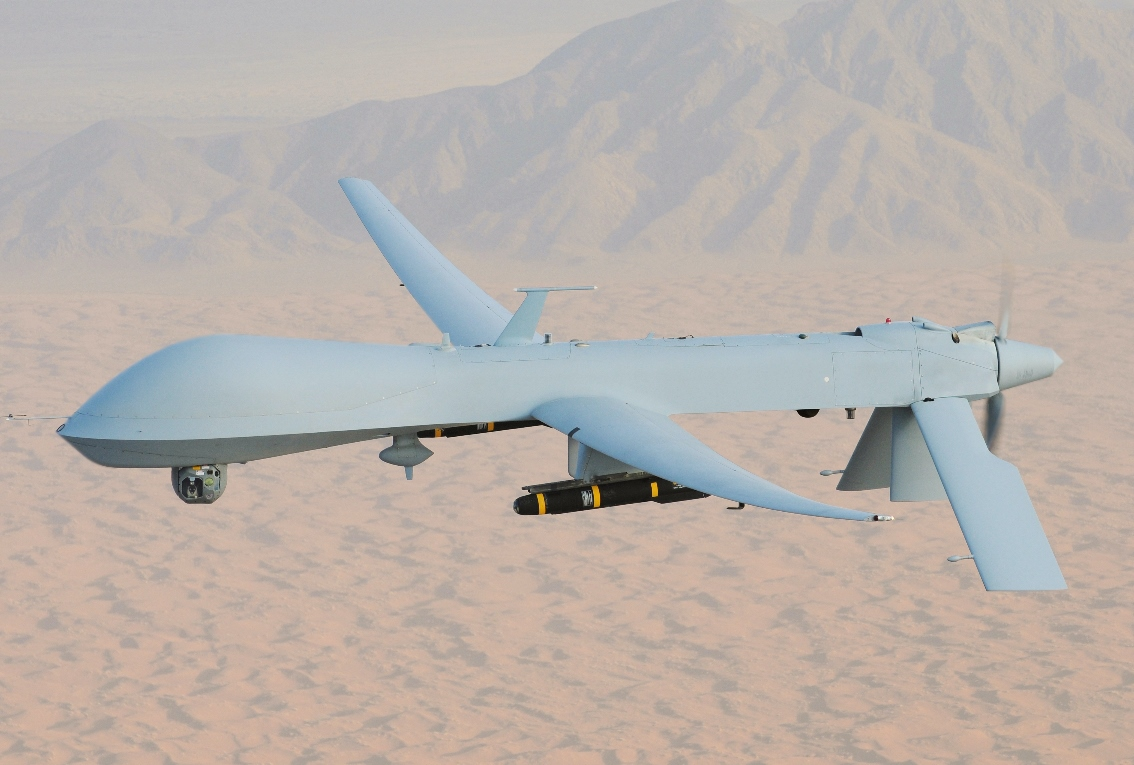
A US Air Force MQ-1 armed with AGM-114 Hellfire missiles

In the post-9/11 era, during the Global War on Terrorism, the US adopted the doctrine of "homeland security" as a policy to promote its national interests globally.

==== Iraq War ====
The US invaded Iraq again in 2003 in the aftermath of 9/11. One outcome of Iraq's rapid defeat was Order 39, which privatized the Iraqi economy and permitted 100% foreign ownership of Iraqi assets. According to sociologist Christopher Doran of the University of Indiana, Order 39 granted foreign investors the right to sue the Iraqi government in international arbitration tribunals over profit-related disputes. It also abolished import tariffs and taxes, exposing local industries and agricultural producers to competition from cheap foreign imports. Additionally, the order allowed foreign entities to obtain full ownership of domestic banks, establish private banking institutions, and secure land leases for up to 40 years. Order 49 replaced Iraq's progressive income tax—which previously peaked at 45 percent—with a 15 percent flat tax applied equally to individuals and corporations. International oil companies from the US, Europe, and China secured technical service contracts (but not ownership of reserves) starting in 2009, and invested billions of dollars that increased production from ~1.5 million barrels per day (mb/d) in 2003 to ~4.6 mb/d by 2023. 75%+ of the resulting revenues went to the Iraqi National Oil Company.

According to UK international relations and geography scholars Simon Mabon and Stephen Royle, models of imperialist governance were continued in Iraq through the Sunni awakening or Sahawah, spearheaded by US General David Petraeus to defeat AQI in al-Anbar by providing hundreds of millions of dollars in subsidies to tribal fighters and figures, thereby followed the principles of imperialist counter-insurgency through "tribal renting."

==== Trump administration ====
An AI-generated image shared by Donald Trump on Truth Social depicting the United States' closest geographic neighbors under U.S. control, covered in the pattern of the U.S. flag.

Throughout both of his presidencies, U.S. president Donald Trump has expressed a desire to expand the United States' territory and influence through both land purchases and military means. Trump first stated his desire to annex Greenland during his first presidency; he has pursued a campaign to acquire Greenland during his second presidency. He has also suggested annexation or taking control of Canada, Iceland, Mexico, Cuba, the Panama Canal and Gaza Strip. After proposing an invasion of Venezuela during his first presidency, Trump's second administration removed President Nicolás Maduro as part of Operation Absolute Resolve and stated the U.S. would "run" Venezuela; the Venezuelan government, led by acting president Delcy Rodríguez, remains in place but is far more amicable to American interests than it was under Maduro. Threats were also made against Colombia and then-president Gustavo Petro, whom Trump accused of drug trafficking. Amid the 2026 Iran war, Trump has commented about invading and seizing control of both the Strait of Hormuz and Kharg Island from Iran.

Asked: Are there limits on your global power?

Yeah, there is one thing. My own morality. My own mind. It's the only thing that can stop me. I don't need international law. I'm not looking to hurt people.

— Donald Trump, January 7, 2026

New York Times White House correspondents wrote that "Mr. Trump's assessment... was the most blunt acknowledgment yet of his worldview. At its core is the concept that national strength, rather than laws, treaties and conventions, should be the deciding factor as powers collide."

Trump's determination to treat the Western Hemisphere as a U.S. sphere of influence has been characterized as a revival of the Monroe Doctrine in what has become known as the Donroe Doctrine. On his orders, U.S. federal agencies adopted new names for shared international waters, renaming the Gulf of Mexico as "Gulf of America" in 2025 and Lake Ontario as "Lake America" in 2026. Deputy Chief of Staff Stephen Miller and Secretary of State Marco Rubio defended the second Trump administration's foreign policy as a matter of operating as a superpower nation and for national security purposes. Numerous politicians outside the U.S. have criticized Trump's annexation comments. The Democratic Party has introduced bills to prevent the Trump administration from invading countries without the approval of Congress.

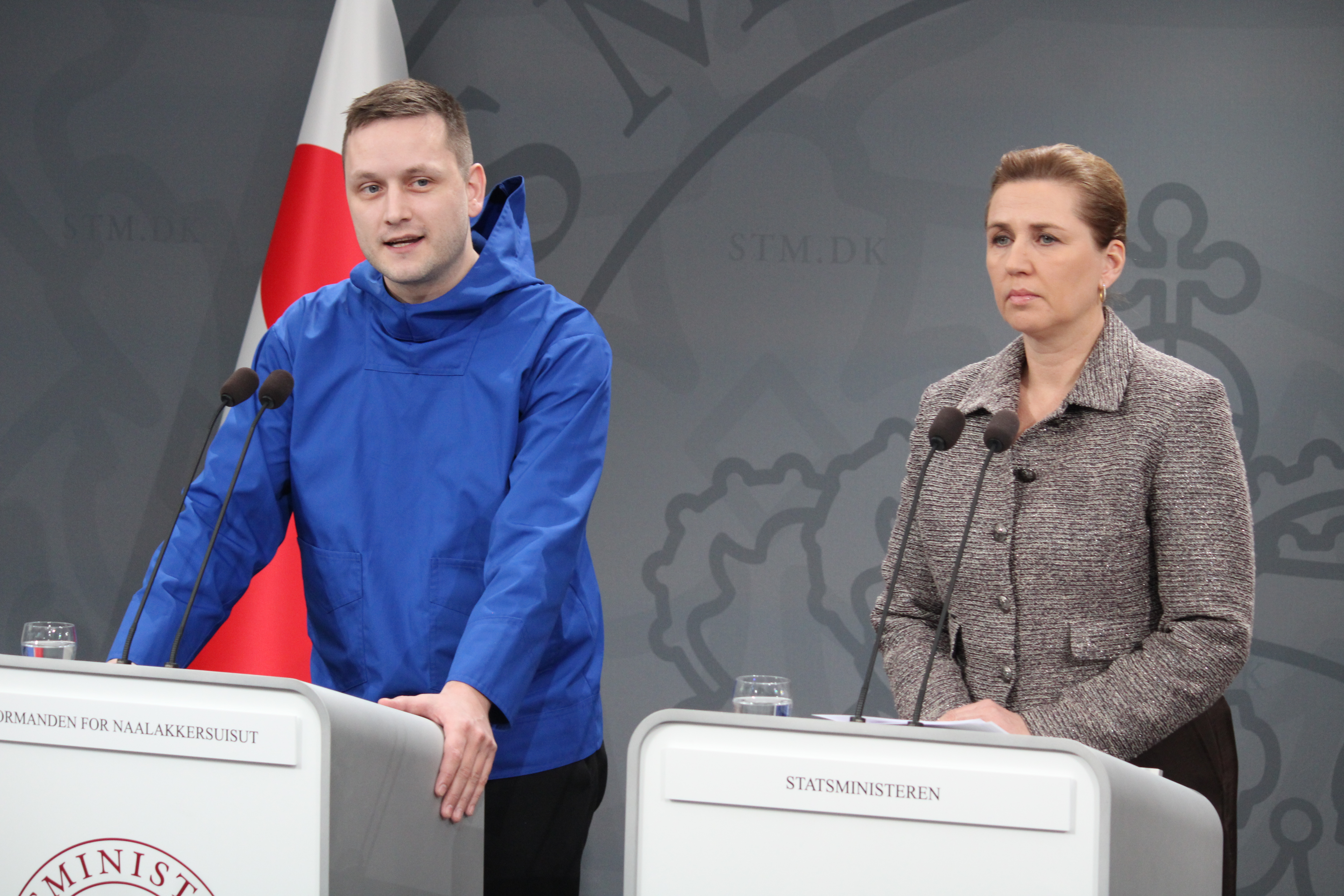
Greenlandic leader Jens Frederik-Nielsen announcing "We choose Denmark" at a January 2026 press conference with Mette Frederiksen in response to Trump's threats to invade or annex the country

On January 3, 2026, the United States launched Operation Absolute Resolve, a strike on Venezuela. After bombing military installations there, US Special Forces captured Venezuelan President Nicolás Maduro and his wife, Cilia Flores, charging them with narco-terrorism. Trump said that the US would temporarily "run" Venezuela and exploit its oil resources, which are among the world's largest. Critics and experts described the attack as illegal and as "resource imperialism". The New York Times editorial board called it an act of "latter-day imperialism" which lacked "any semblance of international legitimacy".

Numerous critics and analysts identified the 2026 US-Israel attacks on Iran with a more open embrace of expansionism and imperialism by the Trump administration. The US–Israeli attack is widely considered a "war of choice" and has been compared to the 2003 invasion of Iraq. Saeed Shah wrote that many in the Global South do not view the war as having the moral purpose that the US and many of its allies asserted, and that they instead see the war as a failure of diplomacy, and an act of aggression against a weaker nation. Rami Khouri called the war "the digital reconfiguration of Western colonial, imperialistic militarism" and identified the inability of autocratic governments in the Arab world to "mount a cohesive diplomatic or military response" to US and Israeli interventions as a factor that contributed to the outbreak of war. Steve Tsang of the SOAS China institute said China will argue that the war was another example of "western hypocrisy and western talk of the liberal international order". Gilbert Achcar said that the US was practicing a modernized version of gunboat diplomacy. Gokay and Hamourtziadou connected the attack on Iran with a longstanding pattern of US interventions in the region, saying that the war is "largely unrelated to the idiosyncrasies of Donald Trump, who is simply implementing a longstanding project aimed at establishing complete US dominance over the energy-rich regions of the Middle East". They also connected the attack on Iran in the midst of negotiations to the history of United States treaty-breaking during westward expansion.{

According to Jeet Heer, American imperialism under Donald Trump is killing people abroad and domestically.

== Strategy ==
=== Military alliances ===
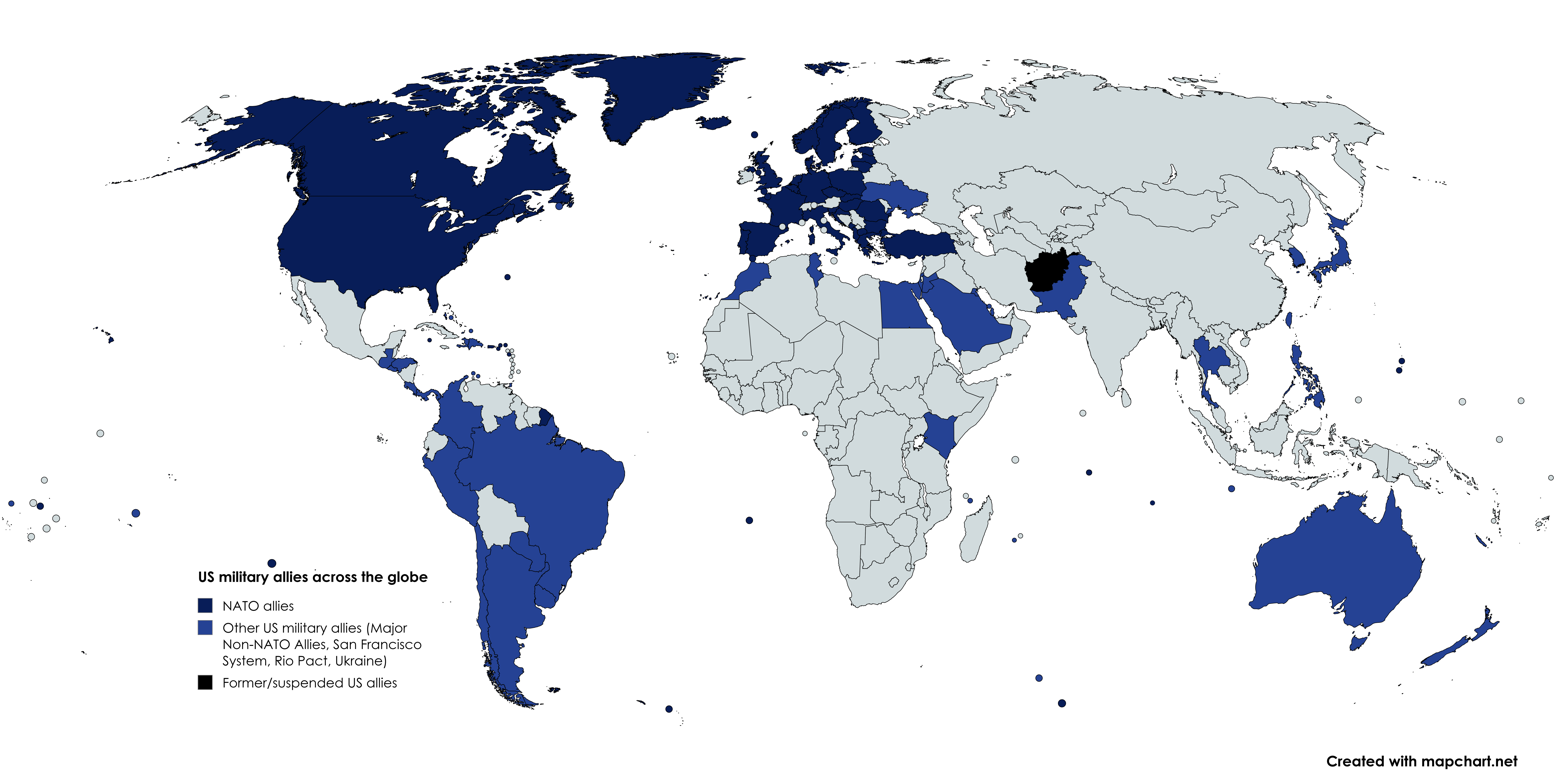
A map of America and its military alliances around the world

Kennan designed in 1948 a globe-circling system of alliances embracing non-Communist countries. Disregarding George Washington's dictum of avoiding entangling alliances, in the early Cold War the US established 44 formal alliances and other relationships with nearly 100 countries. The enthusiasm was reciprocal. Most of the world was interested to ally with the US. In the early 1940s, observing the attitudes of other nations, Isaiah Bowman, Henry Luce, and Wendell Willkie stressed the potential of such relationships. This unprecedented scale was aided by the eagerness with which America was welcomed.

On the eve of the Rio Treaty and NATO, political theorist James Burnham envisaged:

A federation however in which the federal units are not equal, in which one of them leads ... and holds the decisive instrument of material power, is in reality an empire. The word ... would in practice doubtless never be employed. Whatever the words, it is well also to know the reality. In reality, the only alternative to the Communist World Empire is an American Empire which will be, if not literally worldwide in formal boundaries, capable of exercising decisive world control.

— James Burnham

Zbigniew Brzezinski listed three goals of US geostrategy: "to prevent collusion and maintain security dependence among the vassals, to keep tributaries pliant and protected and to keep the barbarians from coming together". Arnold J. Toynbee in 1962 and Max Ostrovsky in 2007 associated US alliances with the Roman client system during the late Roman Republic. Cicero defended the strategy, claiming that by defending its allies, Rome gained world dominion.

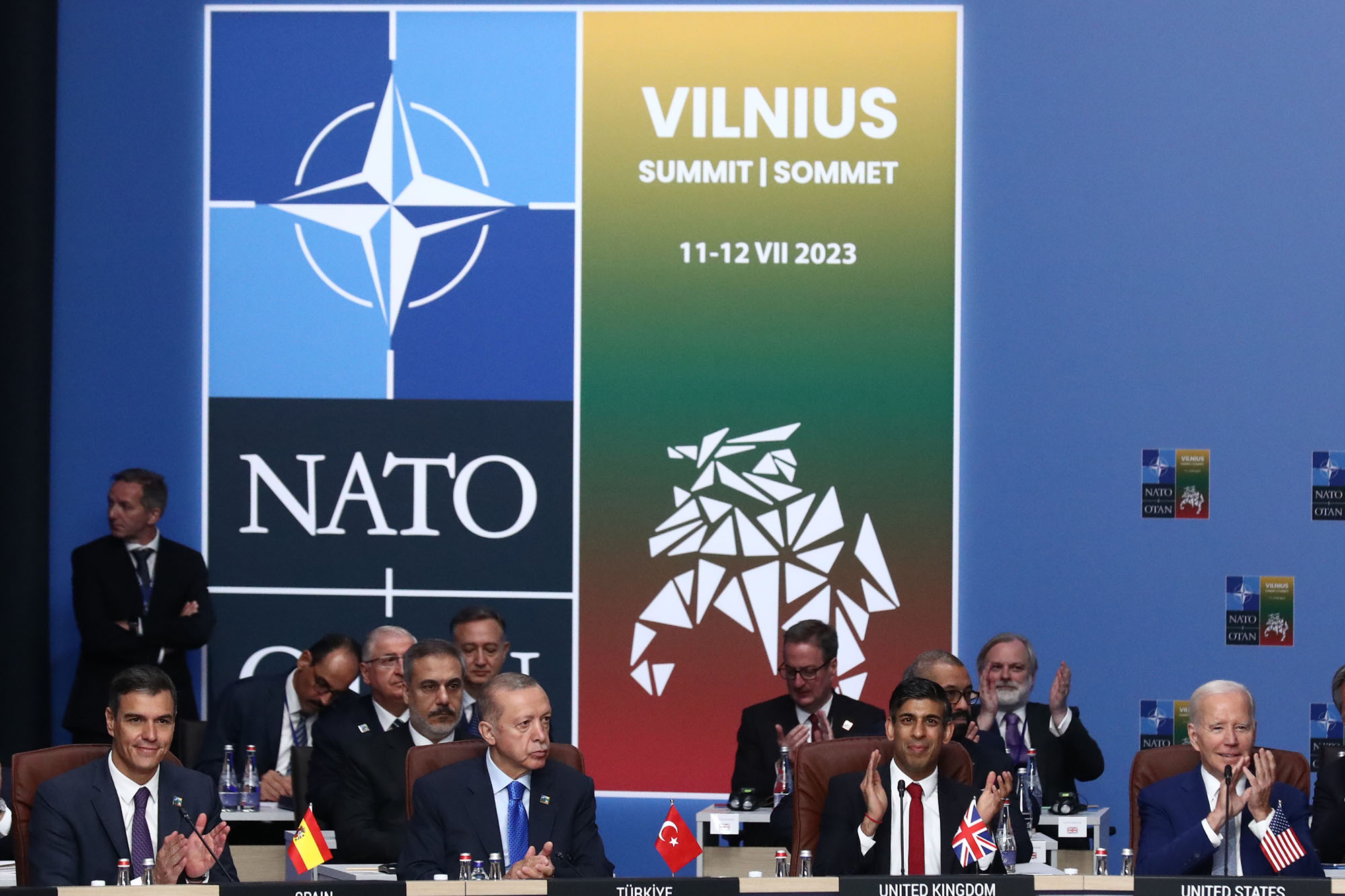
U.S. President Joe Biden at the 2023 Vilnius NATO summit

However, American influence was largely welcomed. Ostrovsky claimed that although all earlier empires, especially persistent empires, were in some measure by bargain, cooperation and invitation, in the post-1945 world this took an extreme form. In 1989, political scientist Huntington stated that most democratic states entered "hegemonic" alliances, while Krauthammer stated that "[Western] Europe achieved the single greatest transfer of sovereignty in world history."

Bertrand Russell theorized about the "military unification of the world" led by the Anglo-American powers.

Since President Dwight Eisenhower, US administrations claimed that the US carried a disproportionate share of the military and financial burden for maintaining NATO. In 2025, President Trump announced that he wanted NATO countries to raise their contributions from 2 to 5% of their respective GDPs, to which they later agreed. The Trump administration also pushed allies and others over trade and investment, a shift from decades of advocating free trade and the rule of law. Trump made (possibly chimerical) territorial claims on Greenland and Canada. Canada and others engaged in designing an anti-hegemonic "common front" with the Europeans, particularly with Denmark, and Latin America, particularly Mexico and Panama.

=== Military bases ===
Distribution of overseas U.S. military presence world-wide in 2007 (excluding NATO). Their presence has generated controversy and opposition.: United States Iraq (also >1,000 personnel) More than 1,000 personnel More than 100 personnel Use of military facilities See List of United States military bases.

During World War II, Roosevelt promised that the American eagle will "fly high and strike hard". "But he can only do so if he has safe perches around the world." After the war, the US established a network of bases. NCS-162/2 of 1953 stated, "The military striking power necessary to retaliate depends for the foreseeable future on having bases in allied countries." No foreign bases were present on US soil.

In his New Frontier speech in 1960, future President John F. Kennedy noted that America had established "frontiers" on every continent. On Guam, a common joke had it that few people other than Kremlin nuclear targeters knew about their island.

While territories such as Guam, the US Virgin Islands, the Northern Mariana Islands, American Samoa, and Puerto Rico are US territories, the US supported independence for many one-time territories. Examples include the Philippines (1946), the Panama Canal Zone (1979), Palau (1981), the Federated States of Micronesia (1986), and the Marshall Islands (1986). Most of them continued to host US bases. In 2003, the US had bases in over 36 countries, The US operates a base in Guantánamo Bay, Cuba, despite the country's objections.

As of 2024, the US deployed approximately 160,000 active-duty personnel outside the US and its territories. In 2015 the Department of Defense reported that its bases numbered 587, while an independent look reported 800, including 174 in Germany, 113 in Japan, and 83 in South Korea. Some bases, such as Rammstein Air Base, are city-sized, with schools, hospitals and power plants.

=== Unified combatant command ===
Unified Combatant Commands map

The US network of military alliances and bases is coordinated by the Unified combatant command (UCC). The UCC system is rooted in WWII. The UCC was founded to contain the USSR, but outlived it and expanded. As of 2025, the US operated six geographic commands.

Dick Cheney served as Secretary of Defense during the end of the Cold War, and afterwards recommended, "The strategic command, control and communication system should continue to evolve toward a joint global structure..." In 1998, the US assigned Russia, the former Soviet Republics and its former satellite states in Europe to EUCOM and those of the Central Asia to CENTCOM.

In 2002, for the first time, the US divided the entire Earth among US commands. The final unassigned region—Antarctica—fell to PACOM, which included the half of the globe covered by the Pacific Ocean.

No other nation has anything approaching the US network of overseas bases, forward deployed forces and military relationships.

=== Cultural imperialism ===
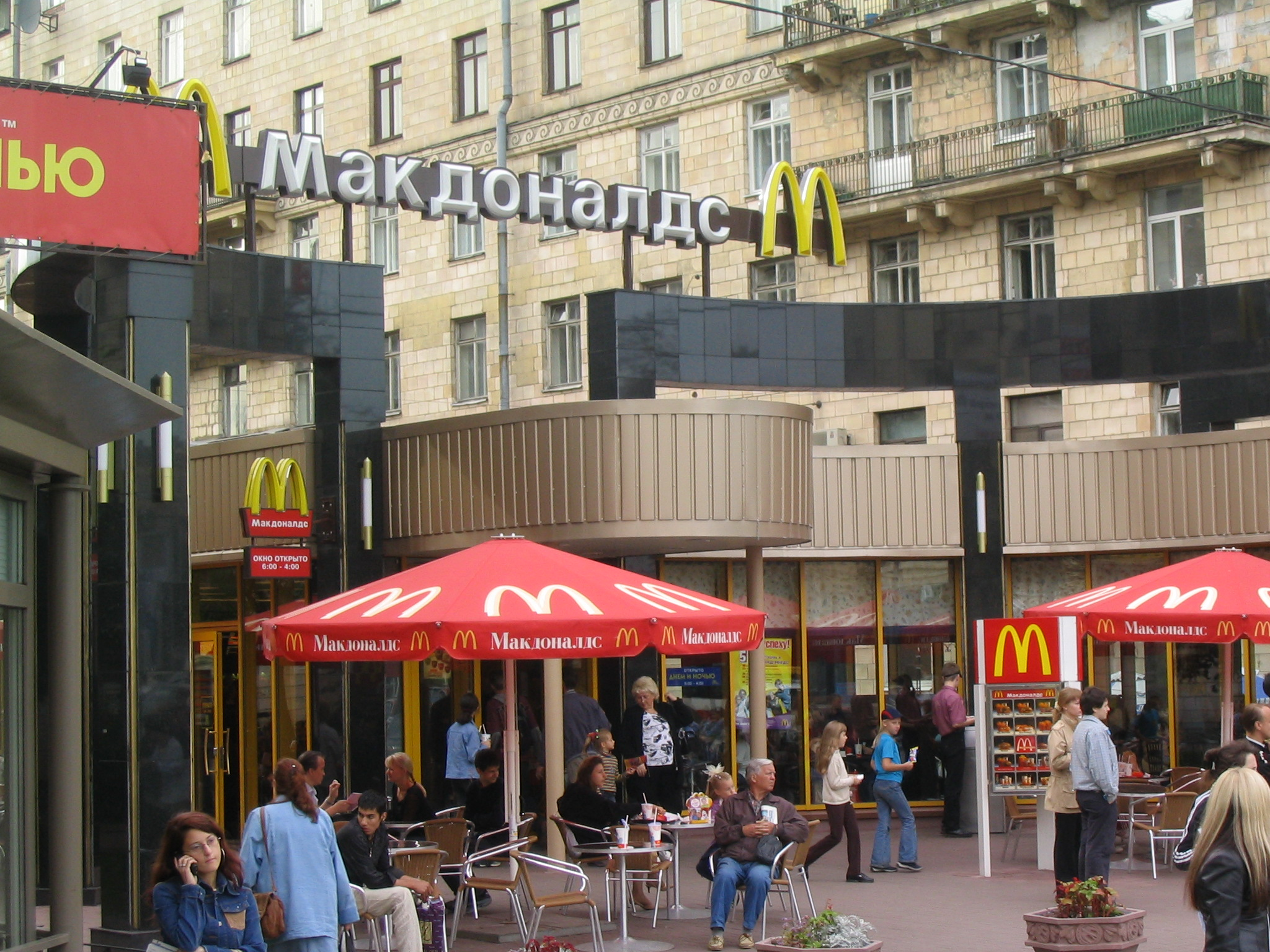
McDonald's in Saint Petersburg, Russia

US cultural exports have dominated key cultural sectors since the advent of movies in the early 20th century. The US introduced many new cultural sectors, and at least initially dominated them. US cultural products (video, video games, music, literature, science, fashion) typically spread ideas of individualism, innovation, and consumerism, often welcomed as modern/aspirational. In 2025 their share varied by medium and region. As of 2025:

- US films account for 60–70% of box-office sales in Europe and many other markets.
- American musical artists lead streaming charts; US labels hold ~40–50% of global market share.
- Fast food/consumer brands: Chains such as McDonald's and Coca-Cola operate in 100+ countries, reflecting "Coca-Colonization".
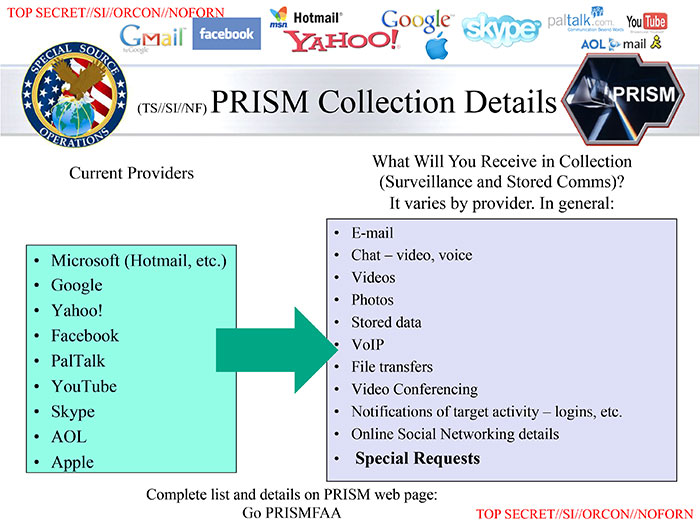
  PRISM: a clandestine surveillance program through which the NSA collects user data from American companies such as YouTube and Facebook
- Streaming platforms such as Netflix and YouTube distribute American content to a global audience.
- US-affiliated individuals have won 55-60% of science-related Nobel Prizes.
- Overall trade: US cultural goods/services exports are ~$30–40B annually; soft power rankings rank the US #1 in cultural influence.
- In the 20th century, English became the global lingua franca for cultural production. As of 2024, 95–98% of scientific publications are in English. The US produces 25-30% of published books.
- In relation to religion, Protestant missionary groups originating from the Deep South of the United States were deliberately introduced as a strategy by Washington to reduce the influence of Roman Catholic social movements in Latin America.

However, US cultural dominance is waning, as other cultures increase consumption (Bollywood, Reggaeton) and exports (K-pop, anime/manga) of their own products.

In territories such as Hawaii, missionaries dedicated themselves to converting locals to Christianity and teaching them English (while creating a written form of the Hawaiian language). In the 19th century, the indigenous dance culture of Hula was banned. for a time. In 1896, territorial authorities eliminated Hawaiian from schools. The 1970s Hawaiian Renaissance restored Hawaiian culture across many institutions.

==== Art ====
The art and media that emerged in the 1800s was often concerned with westward expansion.

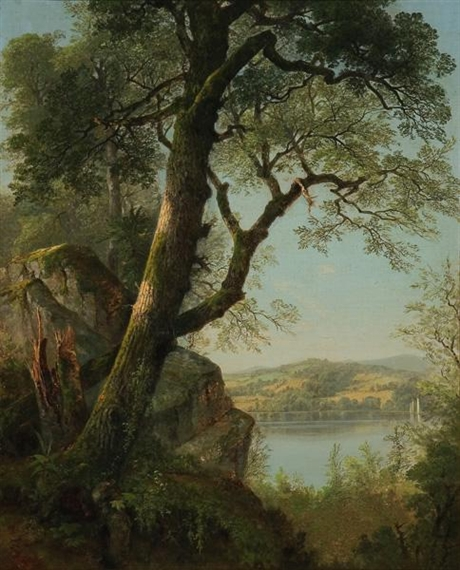
Landscape painting by Edward D. Nelson - A View to the River, 1861

The Hudson River School was a romantic-inspired art movement that formed in 1826 that depicted landscapes and natural scenes. These paintings admired the marvels of American territory and portrayed the US as a promised land. Common themes included: discovery; exploration; settlement and promise.

These themes resurfaced in other artistic expression of the time. John Gast, known for his 1872 painting American Progress, displayed themes of discovery and the beneficial prospects of American expansion. Manifest destiny appeared in some art of the time. Art was also used to justify the belief that the new nation was inevitably destined to grow.

=== Development and imperialism ===
According to many scholars, entities such as United States Agency for International Development (USAID) and US-based non-governmental organizations have advanced US interests through international development programs and foreign aid.

== Motivating factors ==
=== American exceptionalism ===
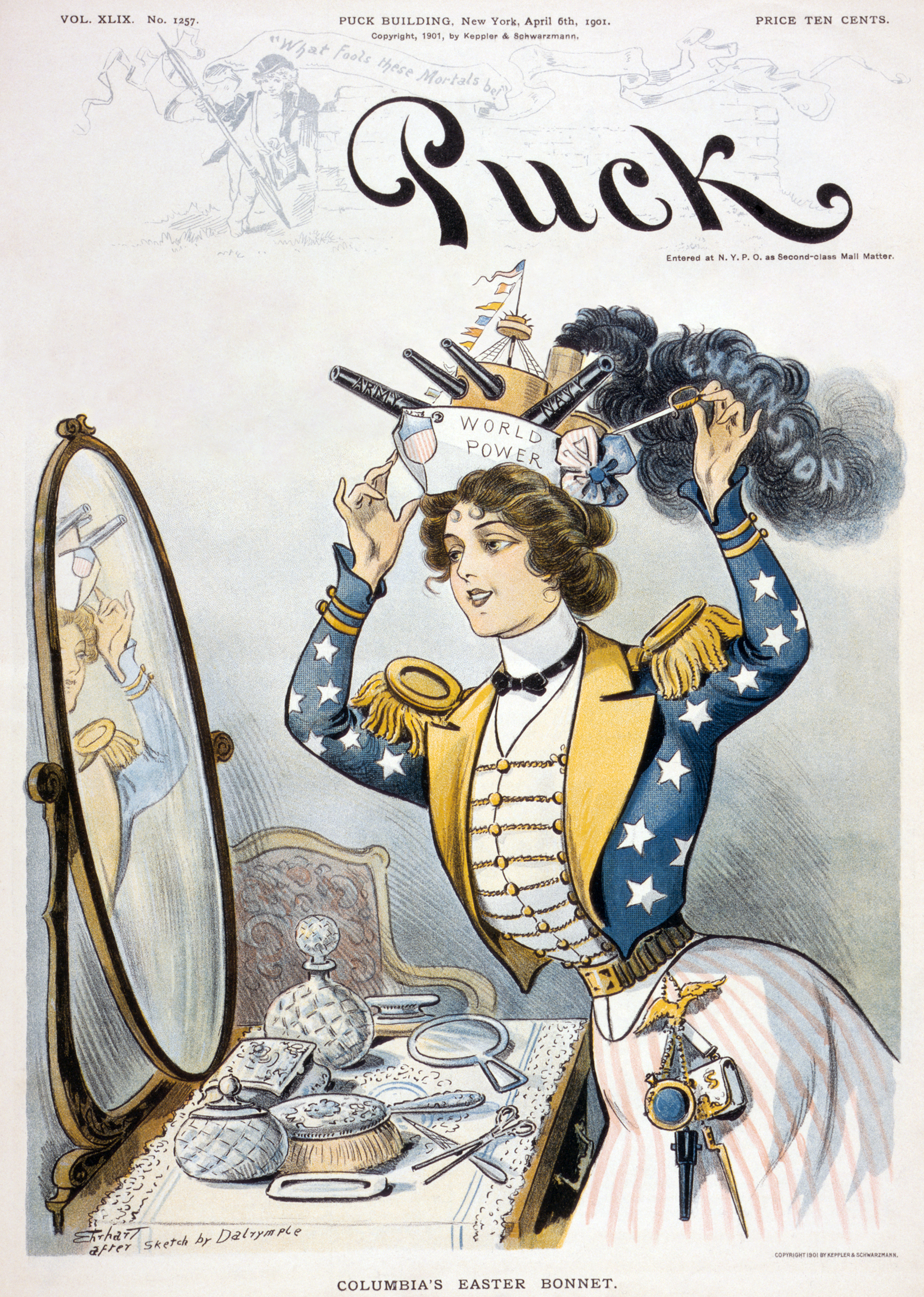
On the cover of Puck published on April 6, 1901, in the wake of gainful victory in the Spanish–American War, Columbia—the National personification of the US—preens herself with an Easter bonnet in the form of a warship bearing the words "World Power" and the word "Expansion" on the smoke coming out of its stack.

American exceptionalism is the belief that the US is unique among nations based on its values, political system, and historical development. Tocqueville was the first to identify the US as qualitatively unique. Reagan notably celebrated US exceptionalism, tying it to Winthrop's "city on a hill" sermon. One facet of that exceptionalism is America's self concept as a protector of freedom, democracy, and free markets.

=== Economic interests ===
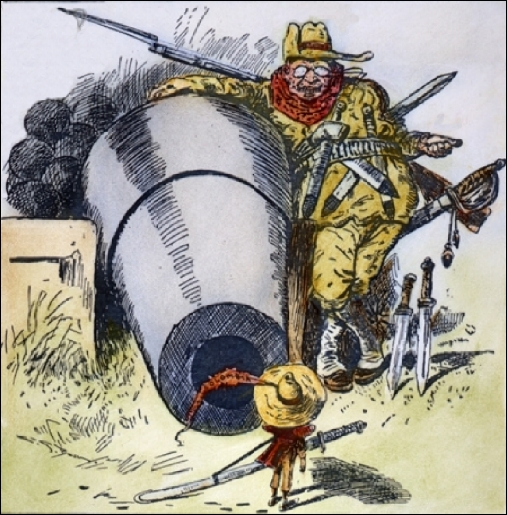
1903 cartoon, "Go Away, Little Man, and Don't Bother Me", depicts President Roosevelt intimidating Colombia to acquire the Panama Canal Zone.

The arms industry, petroleum, and finance industries, in alliance with military and political bureaucracies. have been accused of benefiting from war profiteering and exploiting natural resources. The US ($5.3T) was second to China ($6.2T) in world trade (2024). The US dominated arms exports, although this represented less than 15% of its export total.

A key role for the US military is to protect trade routes, with spillover benefits to other trade-dependent nations such as China. For example, the Strait of Malacca is the main shipping route between the Indian and Pacific Oceans and has at times faced piracy. It carries nearly 100,000 ships/year.

An older argument that the Global North (Europe, Japan, Canada, and the US) had arrayed itself against the Global South became less salient as more of the latter countries began exporting significant amounts of industrial goods, such as airplanes (Brazil), electronics (Vietnam), vehicles (India), and container ships (China).

=== Security ===
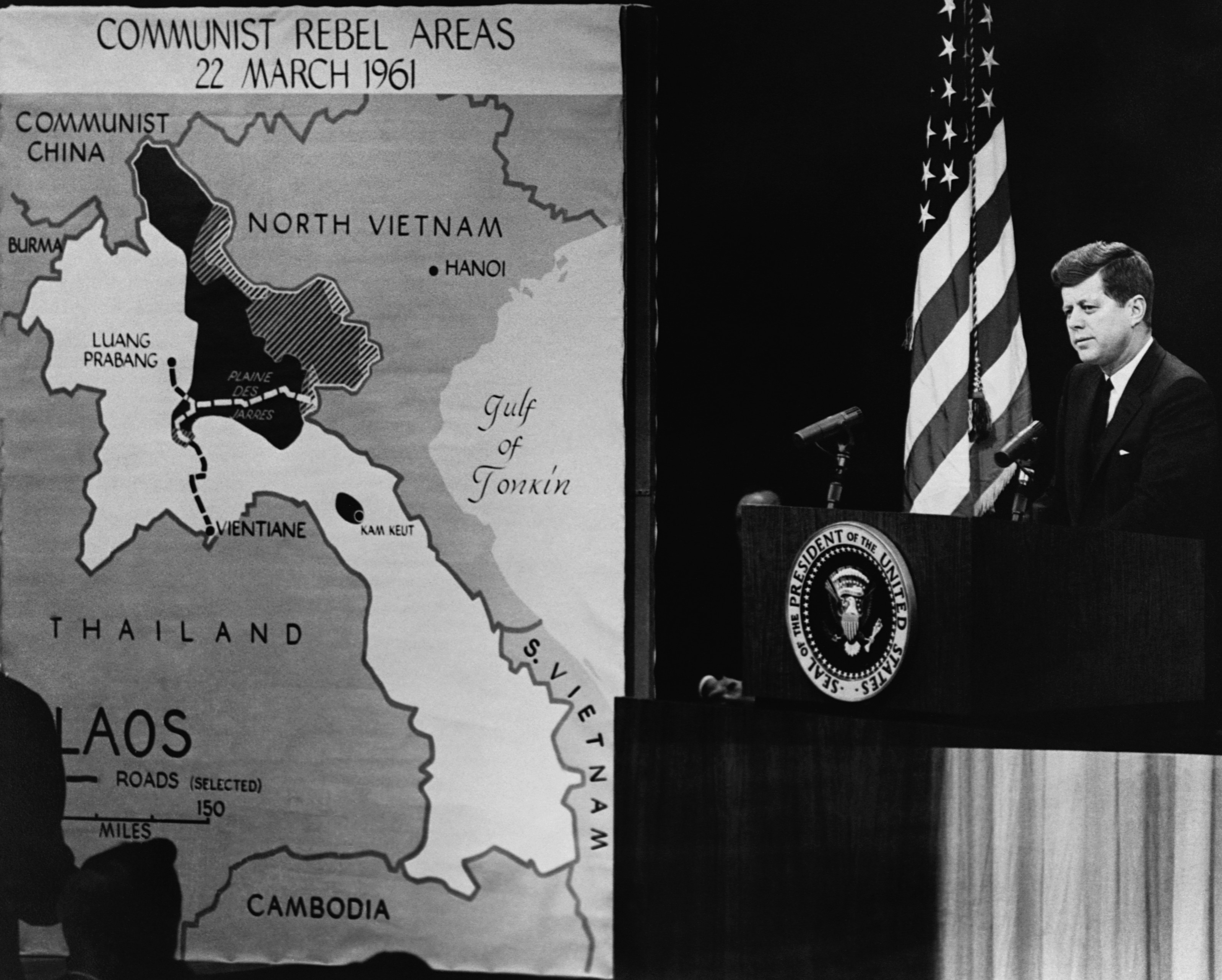
President Kennedy's news conference in March 1961

The advent of nuclear weapons led multiple US administrations to discount the effectiveness of the oceanic moat that had made invading the US impractical for the world's other powerful, later ballistic missile/nuclear, nations. Presidents Truman, Kennedy, and Clinton accepted this conclusion. Thus they sought other means to ensure national security.

One facet of this was to prevent the Eurasian land mass from coming under control of any single power or combination of powers. However, this containment strategy, designed for the Cold War, long outlived it.

In 2005, the US Army War College initiated a study of empires. It classed the American Empire as accidental and defensive (rather than intentional and aggressive), driven by the need for defense against Soviet Communism. In the process the US acquired enormous influence, but did not do so deliberately.

September 11 created a security crisis that triggered intervention, accompanied by heated debates. It was the first significant attack on American soil since Pearl Harbor (the 1993 bombing led by Pakistani terrorist Ramzi Yousef did not do enough damage to trigger a major response).

== Views ==
The extent to which US actions are properly described as imperialism and the US as an empire have been debated since the country's founding, complicated by the lack of standard definitions of the terms and their applicability to the rapidly evolving ways in which nations form and interact.

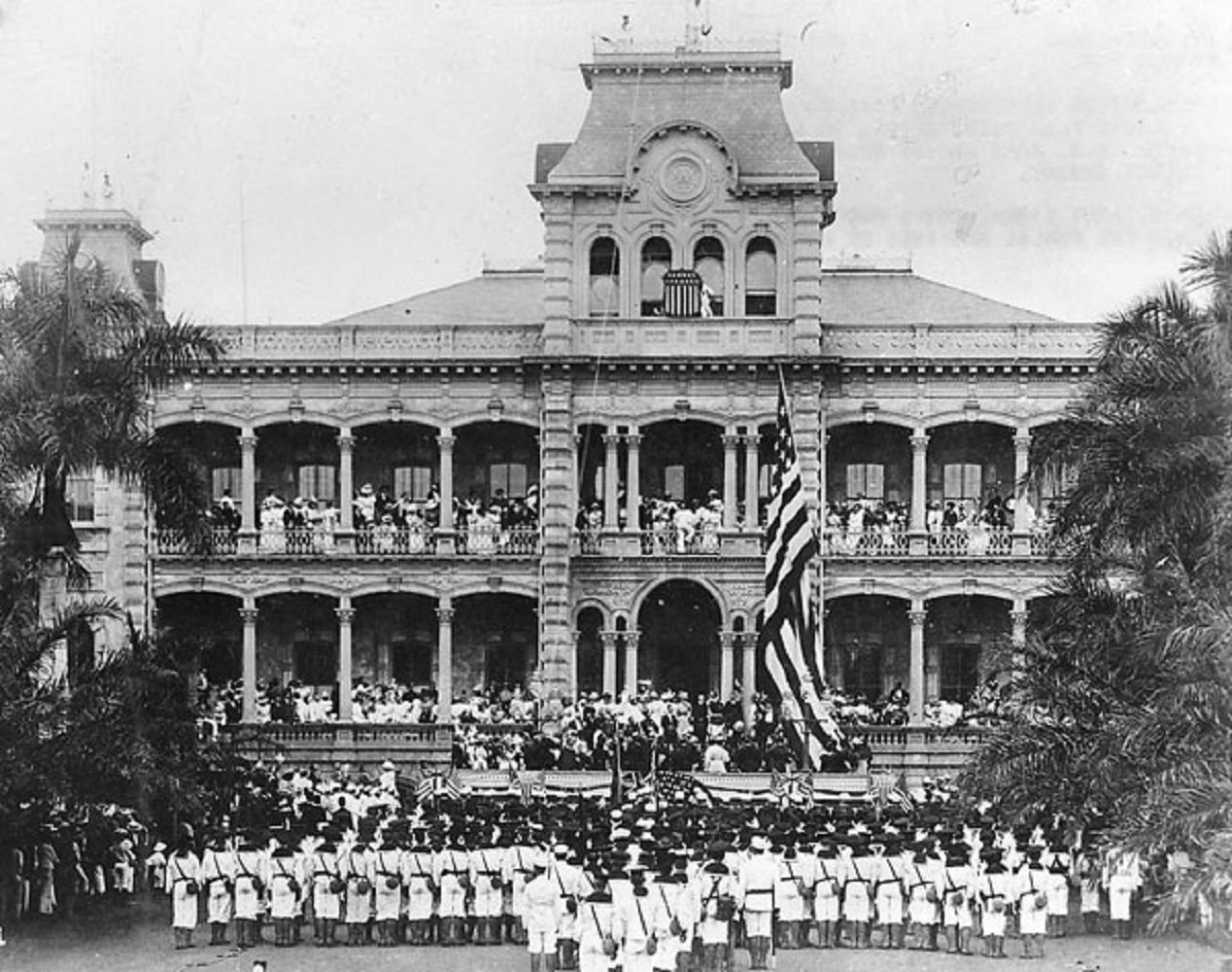
Ceremonies during the annexation of the Republic of Hawaii, 1898

Annexation is the traditional way empires expand. The US expanded westward via repeated annexations, conquests, and purchases of lands claimed by other nations. The last time the US annexed territory was the Philippines in 1899, then a Spanish colony. Thereafter, the US limited itself to other means.

=== Criticisms ===
Historian Daniel Immerwahr considered American territorial expansion across North America at the expense of Native Americans to fit the definition of imperialism.

In 1980 William Appleman Williams claimed that prosperity, liberty and security were merely justifications for imperial behavior.

Author Stuart Creighton Miller stated that the public's sense of innocence limited popular recognition of US imperial conduct.

Historian Walter LaFeber saw the Spanish-American War as a culmination of US westward expansion.

In 1988 linguist/activist Noam Chomsky argued systematic propaganda had been used to establish support for the concept of exceptionalism and provide alternative descriptions of what he viewed as imperialism. In 2008 he stated, "the US is the one country...that was founded as an empire explicitly".

Historians such as Donald W. Meinig (1993) and Charles A. Beard considered the US' entire westward expansion to be imperialism. By contrast, in 1999 paleoconservative pundit Pat Buchanan contrasted the US' later drive to empire with the earlier expansion.

Historian Andrew Bacevich argued in 2004 that the US had not fundamentally changed its foreign policy following the Cold War, and continued to attempt to expand its span of control.

David Hendrickson argued that absolute security implies universal empire.

Chalmers Johnson claimed in 2004 that America's version of the colony was the military base, despite the reduced footprint that the bases provide. He argued that the resistance to occupying foreign territory led to other means, including governing other countries via surrogates or puppet regimes, where domestically unpopular governments survived only through US support.

After September 11 criticisms also continued, as geographer Neil Smith called the official war on terror a third attempt at empire.

Petrodollar warfare (coined by William R. Clark) or oil currency war refers to the alleged US foreign policy of preserving by force the status of the US dollar as the world's reserve currency and as the currency in which oil is priced. Clark cited the 2003 Iraq invasion, 2011 intervention in Libya, and use of force against Iran as examples.

Paul Kramer noted the resemblance between US policies in the Philippines and European actions in their colonies in Asia and Africa during this period.

Historian Geir Lundestad claimed that the US interfered in Italian and French politics in order to defeat elected communist officials.

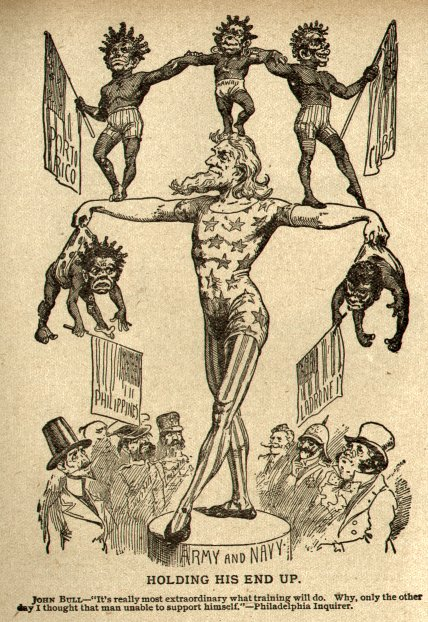
In 1899, Uncle Sam balances his new possessions which are depicted as savage children. The figures are Puerto Rico, Hawaii, Cuba, Philippines and "Ladrone Island" (Guam, largest of the Mariana Islands, which were formerly known as the Ladrones Islands).

Matteo Capasso claimed that the 2011 military intervention in Libya was US-led imperialism and the conclusion of a war begun in the 1970s, fought via "gunboat diplomacy, military bombings, international sanctions and arbitrary use of international law". Capasso argued that the war was intended to strip Libya of its autonomy and resources and weaken and fragment the African/Arab political position.

Educator George Klay Kieh claimed that strategic factors such as a fear of subsequent invasion of Saudi Arabia and other local pro-American monarchies drove the US response in the Gulf War. Iraqi control was feared to threaten a major corridor of international trade. Kieh also noted various economic factors.

Historian Paul Kennedy asserted, "From the time the first settlers arrived in Virginia from England and started moving westward, this was an imperial nation, a conquering nation."

Sociologist Robinson claimed that the US was aiding transnational capitalist groups, a form of economic imperialism. He claimed that the goal was economic subjugation. He characterized American empire since the 1980s as a front for the imperial designs of the American capitalist class, arguing that Washington D.C. had become the seat of the 'empire of capital' from which nations are colonized and re-colonized.

=== Empire supporters ===
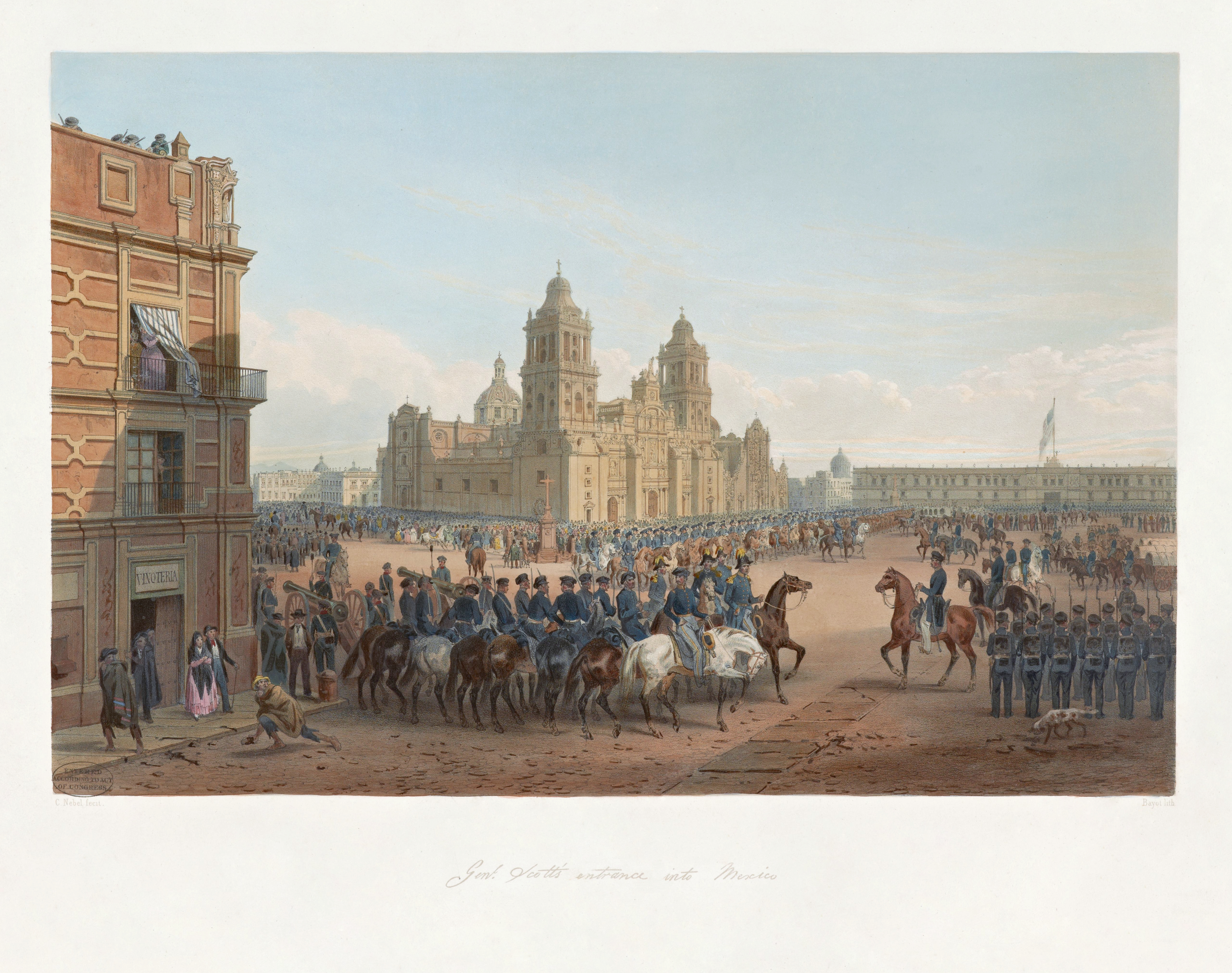
American occupation of Mexico City in 1847

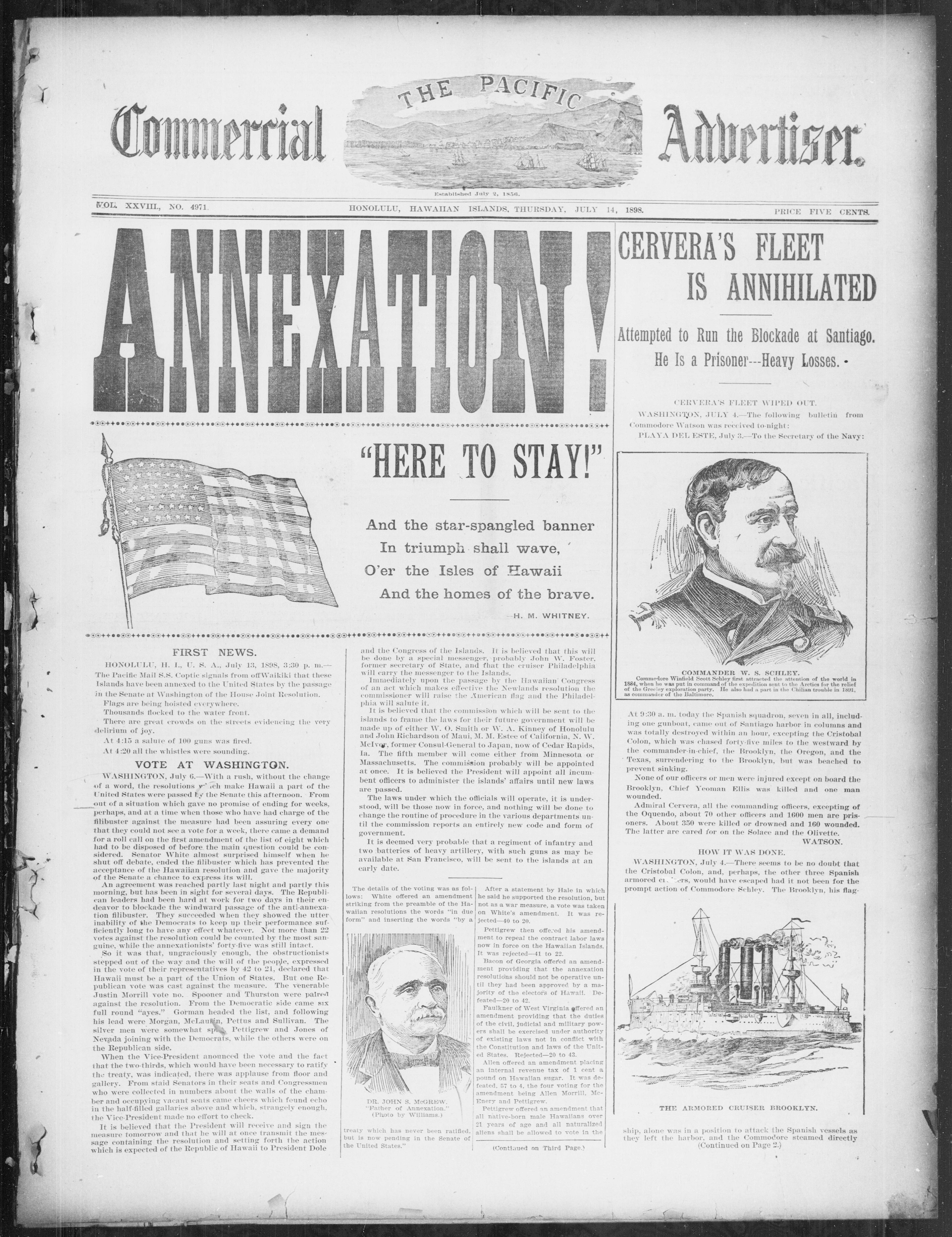
Newspaper reporting the annexation of the Republic of Hawaii in 1898

Following the September 11 attack, the conversation about "American empire" shifted from decrying US overseas actions as imperial. Instead, multiple authors started to call for the US to explicitly seek imperial power. Historian Maier stated that it had become acceptable to ask whether the US had become a conventional empire. Ferguson noted that post-9/11, various commentators had started using the term "American empire" ambivalently or positively. He concluded that US military and economic power had elevated the US into history's most powerful empire. He supported this, claiming that it worked to promote global economic growth, enhance the rule of law and promote representative government, while fearing that the US lacked the long-term commitment to maintain it.

Max Boot advocated for the US to explicitly seek empire. Journalist Lowry recommended "low-grade colonialism" to topple dangerous regimes beyond Afghanistan. The phrase "American empire" appeared more than 1000 times in news stories from November 2002 – April 2003. Academic publications also surged. In 2005, two notable journals, History and Theory and Daedalus, each devoted a special issue to empires.

Historian A. G. Hopkins argued that traditional economic imperialism was obsolete, noting that major oil companies opposed the 2003 US invasion of Iraq. Instead, anxieties about globalization were driving support for US interventions.

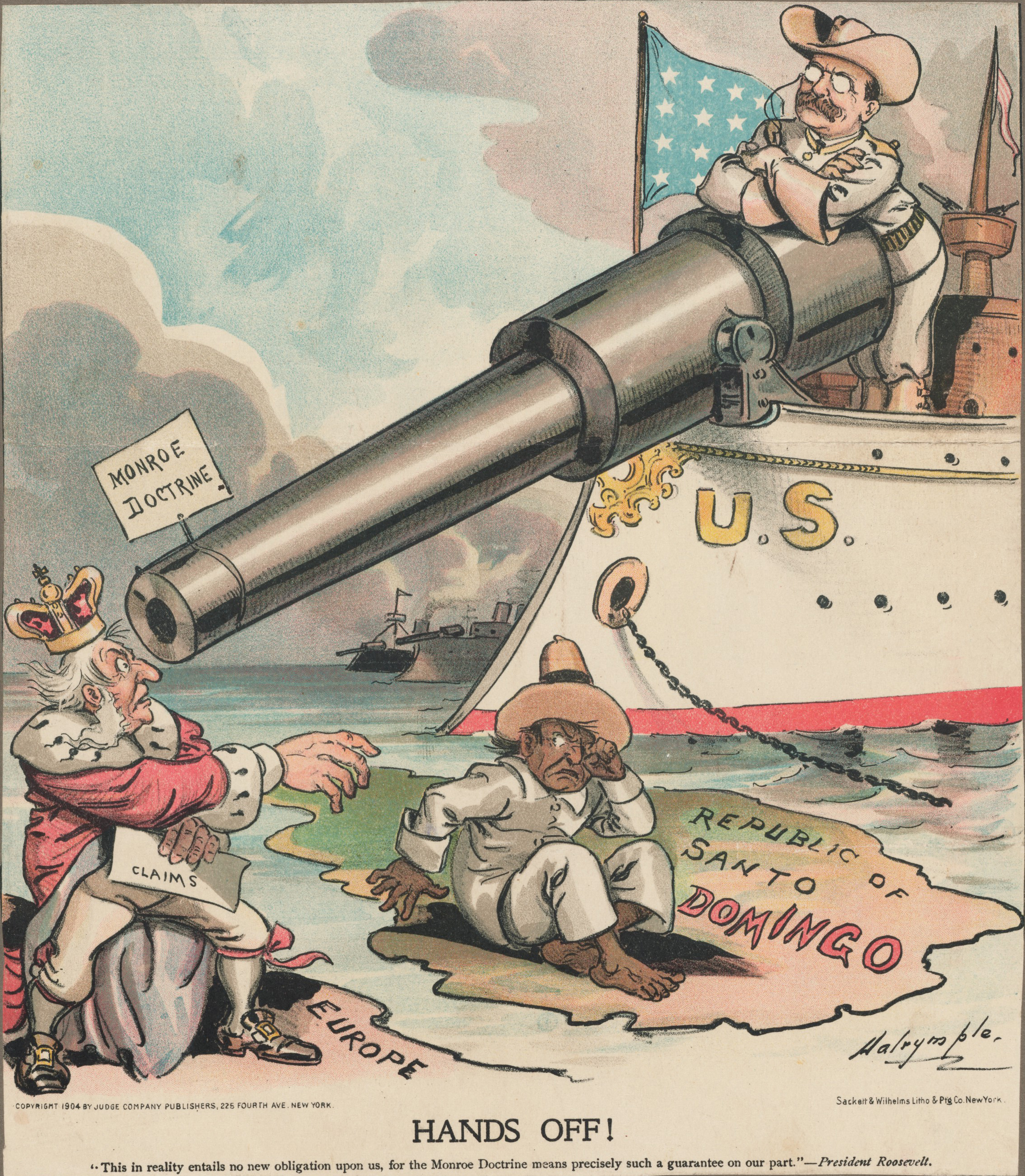
Political cartoon depicting Theodore Roosevelt using the Monroe Doctrine to keep European powers out of the Dominican Republic

Boot located the beginning of US imperialism to "at least 1803", claiming, "US imperialism has been the greatest force for good in the world during the past century. It has defeated communism and Nazism and has intervened against the Taliban and Serbian ethnic cleansing." Other neoconservatives, such as British historian Paul Johnson and writers D'Souza and Steyn and some liberal hawks, such as political scientists Zbigniew Brzezinski and Michael Ignatieff have supported it.

Niall Ferguson stated, "the US is an empire and [...] this might not be wholly bad." He cited parallels between the British Empire and the US in the late 20th and early 21st centuries, though he likens the US more to the Roman Empire. Ferguson argues that these empires had both positive and negative aspects, and that if it continues to learn from history, the US' positives will far outweigh the negatives.

=== US not an empire ===
Stephen Peter Rosen defined an empire as a political unit that has overwhelming military superiority and uses that power to control the internal behavior of other states. Because the US did not govern or control others' territory, he termed it an "indirect" empire.

On April 28, 2003, then-Secretary of Defense Donald Rumsfeld stated, "We don't seek empires. We're not imperialistic. We never have been." Historian Maier says the traditional understanding of "empire" does not apply, because the US does not exert formal control over other nations or engage in systematic conquest. He advanced the term "hegemon" instead. Its enormous influence through high technology, economic power, and impact on popular culture gives it an international outreach that stands in sharp contrast to the inward direction of historic empires.

Historian Anthony Pagden stated that America's unmatched military capability did not demonstrate that it is imperial. Unlike European empires, it has no significant settler populations in its overseas territories and exercises no direct rule anywhere else. It reliably attempts to leave when circumstances permit, as in Iraq in 2011 and Afghanistan in 2021 after withdrawing most of its forces in 2014.

Historian Samuel Flagg Bemis argued that Spanish–American War expansionism was an "aberration", different than that of earlier American history.

Historian Mary Renda argued that the goal was to create political stability, rather than expansion or exploitation.

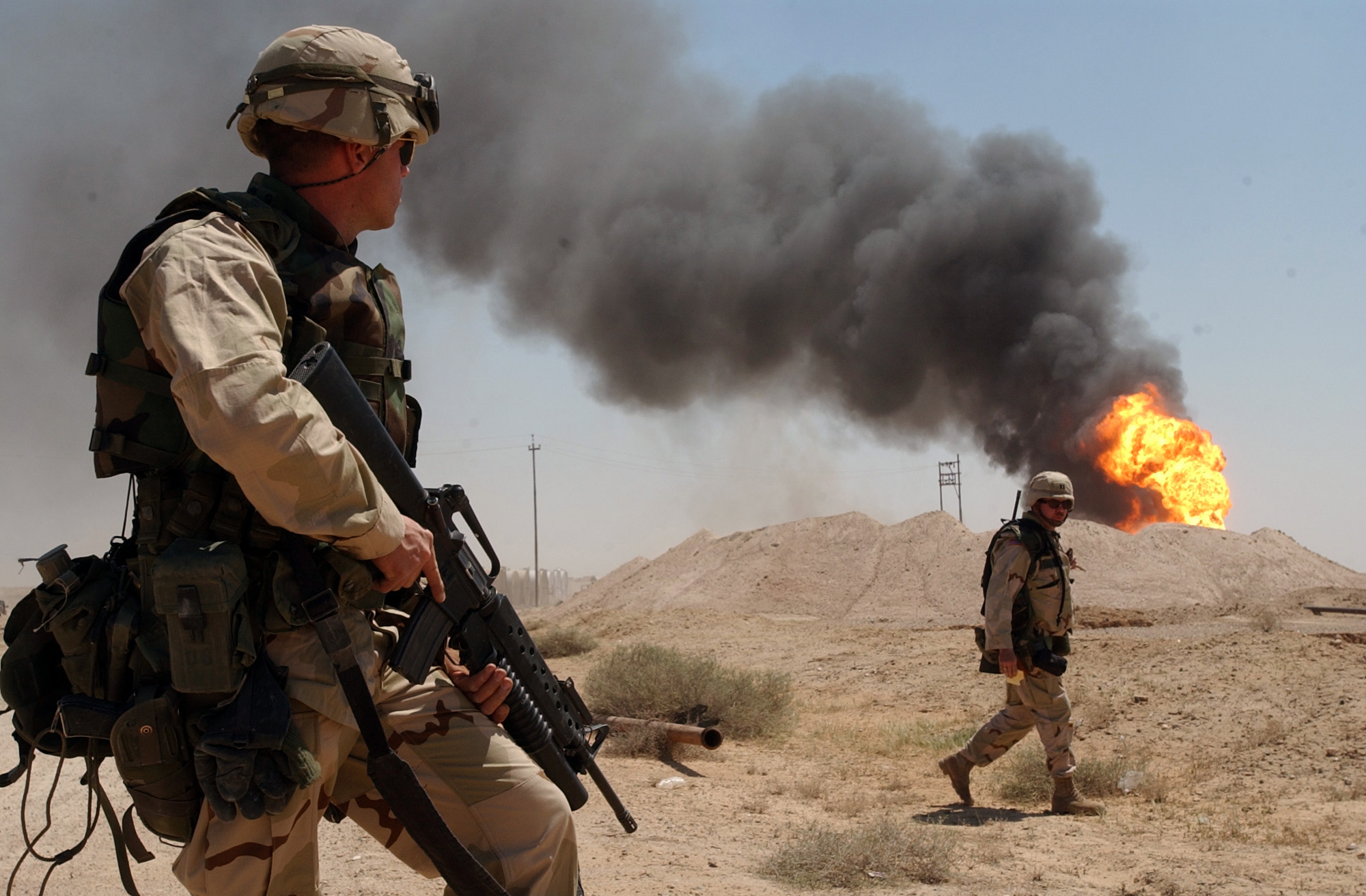
A US soldier stands guard duty near a burning oil well in the Rumaila oil field, Iraq, April 2003.

Geographer David Harvey (geographer) argued that three empires had emerged by the twenty-first century, based on geographical blocs and unequal development. He named the US, the European Union, and Asia (China and Russia) as the imperial blocs, but did not include the Iranian version. This 'new' imperialism align the interests of business and politicians, preventing the rise of economic and political rivals.

=== Empire v hegemony ===
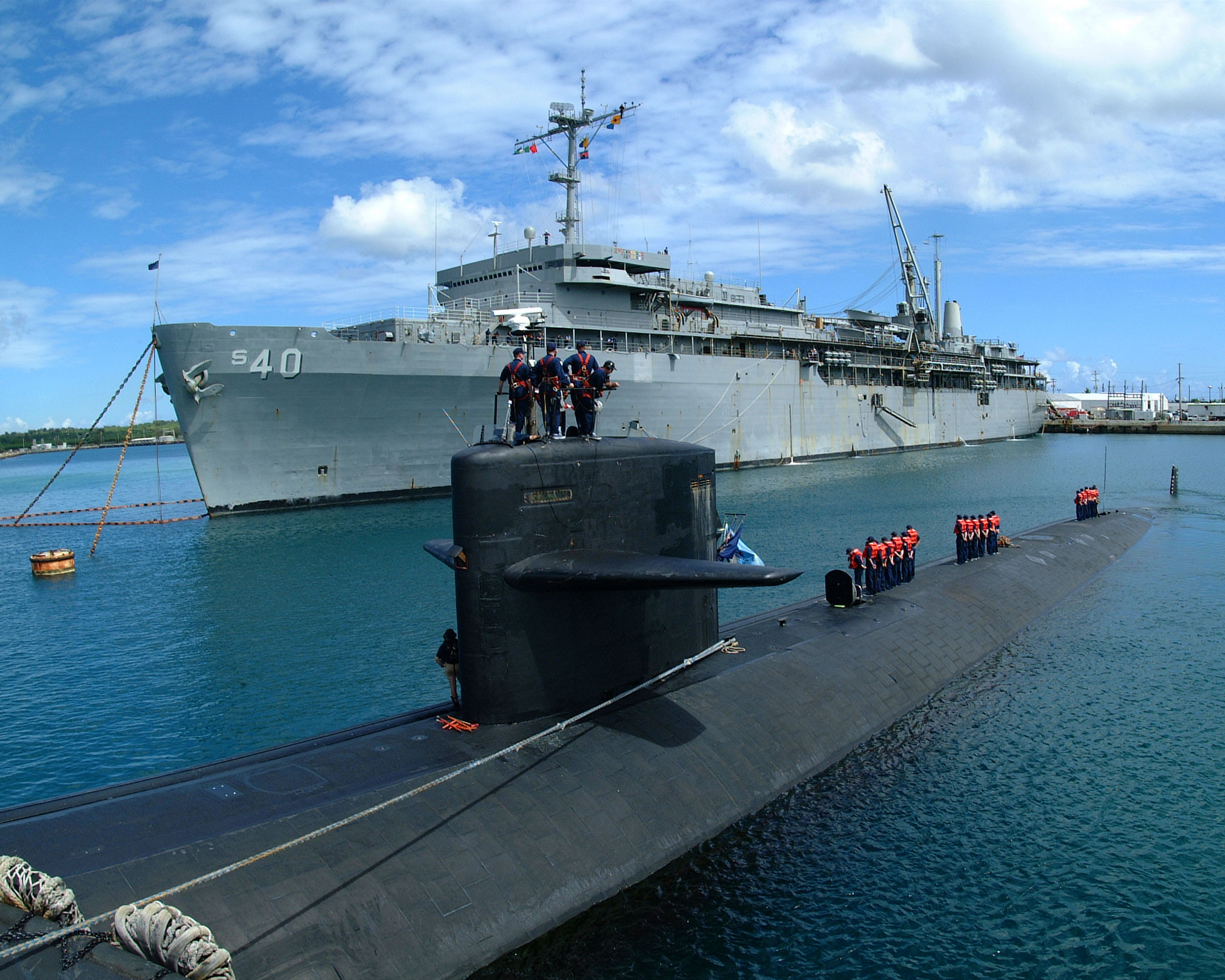
Naval Base Guam in the US territory of Guam

Enlargement of NATO

Archibald Paton Thorton claimed that the term had been widely abused, writing, "imperialism is more often the name of the emotion that reacts to a series of events than a definition" of them". Liberal internationalists argued that even though the post-Cold War era was dominated by the US, that dominance was not imperial. International relations scholar John Ikenberry claimed that international institutions had taken the place of empire.

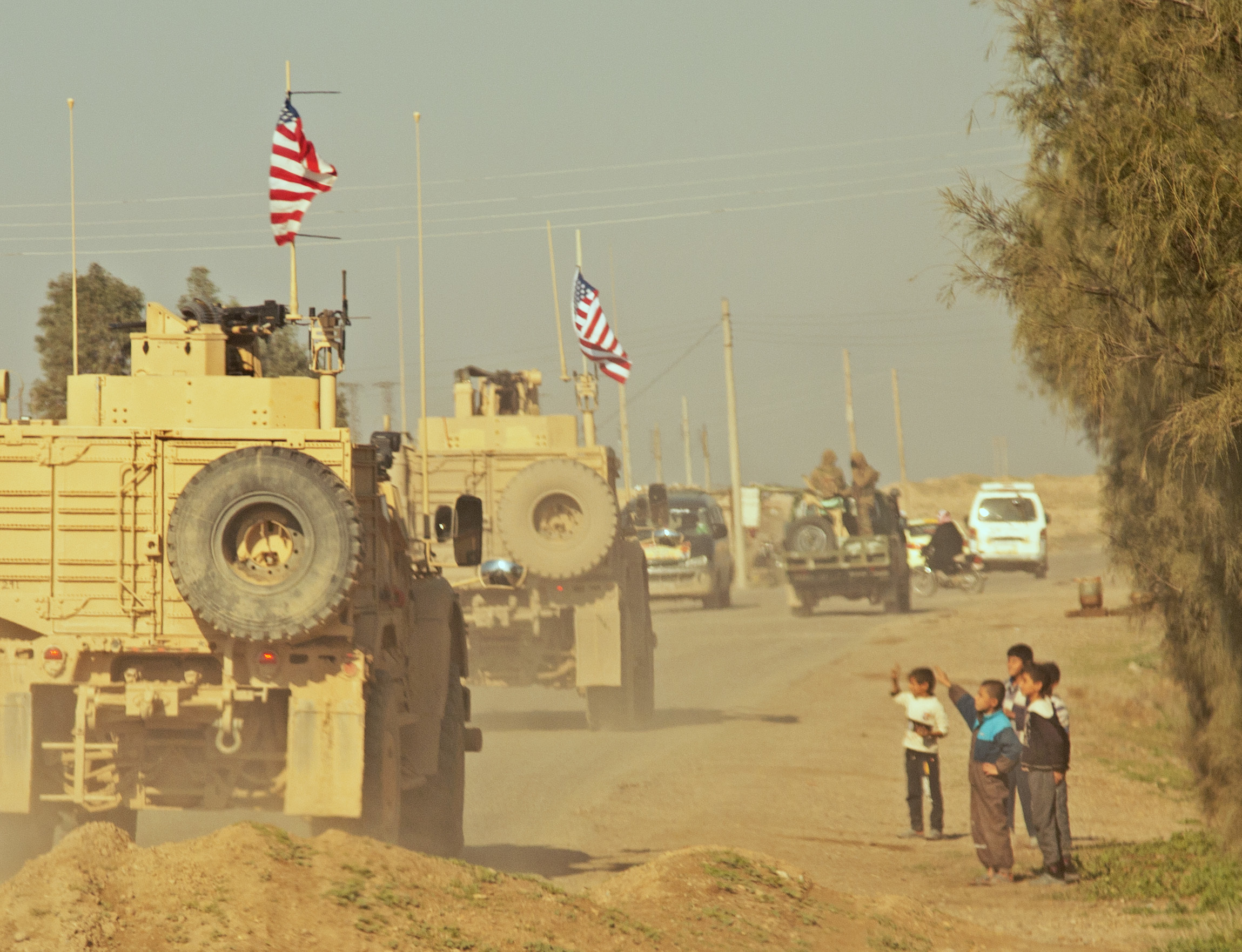
A convoy of US soldiers during the American intervention in the Syrian civil war, December 2018

Michael Walzer said that hegemony is a better term than empire to describe the US, as its dominates external relations, but not internal affairs. Robert Keohane rejected the word 'empire' for the US, because it conflated it with the territorial British and Soviet empires, also preferring hegemony or hegemonic stability.

Political scientists Nexon and Wright claimed that neither 'empire' nor 'hegemony' properly describes foreign relations of the US. They concluded that US foreign relations have moved away from imperialism.

Scholars such as Christopher Layne, Robert J. Art, Geir Lundestad, and Ola Tunander claimed that they were instruments through which the US perpetuated its "hegemonic" role. Before he predicted the Clash of Civilizations, Samuel P. Huntington had concluded that since 1945 most democratic countries had become members of the "alliance system" within which the "position of the US was 'hegemonic'".

=== Historical analogies ===
According to Max Ostrovsky, the pattern known as "defensive imperialism" in Roman studies may apply to the US. It involved isolationism via geographic barriers followed by growing imperialism in response to growing external threats.

Robert D. Kaplan draws parallels between the US bases and Roman garrisons that were established to defend the frontiers and for surveillance of the areas beyond. Ostrovsky and Richard A. Falk saw it differently: "This time there are no frontiers and no areas beyond. The global strategic reach is unprecedented in world history." "The US is by circumstance and design an emerging global empire, the first in the history of the world." Kagan inscribed over a map of US bases: "The Sun never sets." an ironic commentary on a common description of the 19th century British Empire.

Ostrovsky concluded that, disregarding national pride, many states, some of them recent great powers, "surrender their strategic sovereignty en mass[sic]". They hosted US bases, partly covered their expenses, integrated their strategic forces, contributed 1-2% of their GDP, and tipped military, economic and humanitarian contributions in aid of the hegemonic operations worldwide. Unlike economic globalization, Ostrovsky claimed that military globalization involved centralization—integration under a central command.

Richard Ned Lebow, Robert Kelly, Eric W. Robinson, and Herfried Münkler drew parallels between NATO and the Delian League, which evolved into the Athenian Empire.

According to political scientist Kenneth N. Waltz, US alliances do not match the Westphalian system that was characterized by balance of power and equal relations among states,

Historians Andrew Preston and Doug Rossinow claimed that while the Monroe Doctrine contained a commitment to resist European colonialism, it included no limiting principles on US action. Jay Sexton, Professor of History at the University of Missouri, stated that the tactics implementing the doctrine were modeled after those employed by European imperial powers during the 17th and 18th centuries.

== See also ==
- Americanization
- Anti-Americanism
- A People's History of American Empire – 2008 book by Howard Zinn, et al.
- Foreign interventions by the United States
- Foreign policy of the United States
- Foreign relations of the United States
- Historic recurrence
- List of empires
- Neocolonialism
- New Imperialism
- Pax Americana
- Pax Britannica
- Post-American era
- Territorial evolution of the United States
- Territories of the United States
- United States involvement in regime change
- United States involvement in regime change in Latin America

== Works cited ==
- Brown, Dee (1971). Bury My Heart at Wounded Knee: An Indian History of the American West. Macmillan. ISBN 978-0-8050-6669-2.
- Handy, Jim (1994). Revolution in the Countryside: Rural Conflict and Agrarian Reform in Guatemala, 1944–1954. Chapel Hill, North Carolina: University of North Carolina Press. ISBN 978-0-8078-4438-0.
- Holton, Woody (1999). "Land Speculators versus Indians and the Privy Council". Forced Founders: Indians, Debtors, Slaves, and the Making of the American Revolution in Virginia. UNC Press Books. pp. 3–38. ISBN 978-0-8078-9986-1.
- Moulton, Aaron Coy (July 2013). ""Amplies Ayuda Externa" Contra "La Gangrena Comunista": Las Fuerzas Regionales Anticomunistas y la Finalizacion de la Operacion PBFortune, Octobre de 1952" ["Extend External Assistance" Against "The Communist Gangrene": The Regional Anti-Communist Forces and the Finalization of Operation PBFortune, October 1952]. Revista de Historia de América (in Spanish) (149): 45–58. doi:10.35424/rha.149.2013.406. JSTOR 44732841. S2CID 257442076.
- Stokesbury, James L. (1988). A Short History of the Korean War. W. Morrow. ISBN 978-0-688-06377-1.
