= Labor history of the United States =

The nature and power of organized labor in the United States is the outcome of historical tensions among counter-acting forces involving workplace rights, wages, working hours, political expression, labor laws, and other working conditions. Organized unions and their umbrella labor federations such as the AFL–CIO and citywide federations have competed, evolved, merged, and split against a backdrop of changing values and priorities, and periodic federal government intervention.

In most industrial nations, the labor movement sponsored its own political parties, with the US as a conspicuous exception. Both major American parties vied for union votes, with the Democratic Party usually much more successful. Labor unions became a central element of the New Deal coalition that dominated national politics from the 1930s into the mid-1960s during the Fifth Party System. Liberal Republicans who supported unions in the Northeast lost power after 1964. In recent decades, an enduring alliance was formed between labor unions and the Democrats, whereas the Republican Party has become hostile to unions and collective bargaining rights.

The history of organized labor has been a specialty of scholars since the 1890s, and has produced a large amount of scholarly literature focused on the structure of organized unions. In the 1960s, the sub-field of new labor history that emerged as social history was gaining popularity broadly, with a new emphasis on the history of workers, including unorganized workers, and their gender and race. Much scholarship has attempted to bring the social history perspectives into the study of organized labor.

By most measures, the strength of organized labor has declined in the United States over recent decades.

== Organized labor prior to 1900 ==
The history of labor disputes in America substantially precedes the Revolutionary period. Around 1619, when the first elections in the Virginia colony were held, the Polish craftsmen decided to refuse to work, on the basis that they were not allowed to vote. In 1636, for instance, there was a fishermen's strike on an island off the coast of Maine and in 1677 twelve carmen were fined for going on strike in New York City. However, most instances of labor unrest during the colonial period were temporary and isolated, and rarely resulted in the formation of permanent groups of laborers for negotiation purposes. Little legal recourse was available to those injured by the unrest, because strikes were not typically considered illegal. The only known case of criminal prosecution of workers in the colonial era occurred as a result of a carpenters' strike in Savannah in 1746.

=== Legality and Hunt (1842) ===
Commonwealth v. Hunt was a landmark case in the Massachusetts Supreme Judicial Court on the subject of labor unions. Prior to Hunt the legality of labor combinations in America was uncertain. In March 1842, Chief Justice Lemuel Shaw ruled that labor combinations were legal provided that they were organized for a legal purpose and used legal means to achieve their goals.

By the early 19th century, the career path for most artisans still involved apprenticeship under a master, followed by moving into independent production. However, over the course of the Industrial Revolution, this model rapidly changed, particularly in the major metropolitan areas. For instance, in Boston in 1790, the vast majority of the 1,300 artisans in the city described themselves as "master workman". By 1815, journeymen workers without independent means of production had displaced these "masters" as the majority. By that time journeymen also outnumbered masters in New York City and Philadelphia. This shift occurred as a result of large-scale transatlantic and rural-urban migration. Migration into the coastal cities created a larger population of potential laborers, which in turn allowed controllers of capital to invest in labor-intensive enterprises on a larger scale. Craft workers found that these changes launched them into competition with each other to a degree that they had not experienced previously, which limited their opportunities and created substantial risks of downward mobility that had not existed prior to that time.

These conditions led to the first labor combination cases in America. Over the first half of the 19th century, there are twenty-three known cases of indictment and prosecution for criminal conspiracy, taking place in six states: Pennsylvania, Maryland, New York, Louisiana, Massachusetts, and Virginia. The central question in these cases was invariably whether workmen in combination would be permitted to use their collective bargaining power to obtain benefits—increased wages, decreased hours, or improved conditions—which were beyond their ability to obtain as individuals. The cases overwhelmingly resulted in convictions. However, in most instances the plaintiffs' desire was to establish favorable precedent, not to impose harsh penalties, and the fines were typically modest.

One of the central themes of the cases prior to the landmark decision in Commonwealth v. Hunt, which settled the legality of unions, was the applicability of the English common law in post-revolutionary America. Whether the English common law applied—and in particular whether the common law notion that a conspiracy to raise wages was illegal applied—was frequently the subject of debate between the defense and the prosecution. For instance, in Commonwealth v. Pullis, 3 Doc. Hist. 59 (1806), a case against a combination of journeymen cordwainers in Philadelphia for conspiracy to raise their wages, the defense attorneys referred to the common law as arbitrary and unknowable and instead praised the legislature as the embodiment of the democratic promise of the revolution. In ruling that a combination to raise wages was per se illegal, recorder Moses Levy strongly disagreed, writing that "[t]he acts of the legislature form but a small part of that code from which the citizen is to learn his duties ... [i]t is in the volumes of the common law we are to seek for information in the far greater number, as well as the most important causes that come before our tribunals."

As a result of the spate of convictions against combinations of laborers, the typical narrative of early American labor law states that, prior to Hunt in Massachusetts in 1842, peaceable combinations of workingmen to raise wages, shorten hours or ensure employment, were illegal in the United States, as they had been under English common law. In England, criminal conspiracy laws were first held to include combinations in restraint of trade in the Court of Star Chamber early in the 17th century. The precedent was solidified in 1721 by R v Journeymen Tailors of Cambridge, which found tailors guilty of a conspiracy to raise wages. Leonard Levy went so far as to refer to Hunt as the "Magna Carta of American trade-unionism", illustrating its perceived standing as the major point of divergence in the American and English legal treatment of unions which, "removed the stigma of criminality from labor organizations".

However, case law in America prior to Hunt was mixed. Pullis was actually unusual in strictly following the English common law and holding that a combination to raise wages was by itself illegal. More often combination cases prior to Hunt did not hold that unions were illegal per se, but rather found some other justification for a conviction. After Pullis in 1806, eighteen other prosecutions of laborers for conspiracies followed within the next three decades. However, only one such case, People v. Fisher, also held that a combination for the purpose of raising wages was illegal. Several other cases held that the methods used by the unions, rather than the unions themselves, were illegal. For instance, in People v. Melvin, cordwainers were again convicted of a conspiracy to raise wages. Unlike in Pullis, however, the court held that the combination's existence itself was not unlawful, but nevertheless reached a conviction because the cordwainers had refused to work for any master who paid lower wages, or with any laborer who accepted lower wages than what the combination had stipulated. The court held that methods used to obtain higher wages would be unlawful if they were judged to be deleterious to the general welfare of the community. Commonwealth v. Morrow continued to refine this standard, stating that, "an agreement of two or more to the prejudice of the rights of others or of society" would be illegal.

Another line of cases, led by Justice John Gibson of the Supreme Court of Pennsylvania's decision in Commonwealth v. Carlisle, held that motive of the combination, rather than simply its existence, was the key to illegality. Gibson wrote, "Where the act is lawful for an individual, it can be the subject of a conspiracy, when done in concert, only where there is a direct intention that injury shall result from it". Still other courts rejected Pullis' rule of per se illegality in favor of a rule that asked whether the combination was a but-for cause of injury. Thus, as economist Edwin Witte stated, "The doctrine that a combination to raise wages is illegal was allowed to die by common consent. No leading case was required for its overthrow". Nevertheless, while Hunt was not the first case to hold that labor combinations were legal, it was the first to do so explicitly and in clear terms.

=== Early federations ===
The Brotherhood of Locomotive Engineers and Trainmen — now part of the International Brotherhood of Teamsters — was founded in May 1863.

The National Labor Union (NLU), founded in 1866, was the first national labor federation in the United States. It was dissolved in 1877.

The regional Order of the Knights of St. Crispin was founded in the northeast in 1867 and claimed 50,000 members by 1870, by far the largest union in the country. A closely associated union of women, the Daughters of St. Crispin, formed in 1870. In 1879 the Knights formally admitted women, who by 1886 constituted 10 percent of the union's membership, but it was poorly organized and soon declined. They fought encroachments of machinery and unskilled labor on autonomy of skilled shoe workers. One provision in the Crispin constitution explicitly sought to limit the entry of "green hands" into the trade, but this failed because the new machines could be operated by semi-skilled workers and produce more shoes than hand sewing.

=== Railroad brotherhoods ===
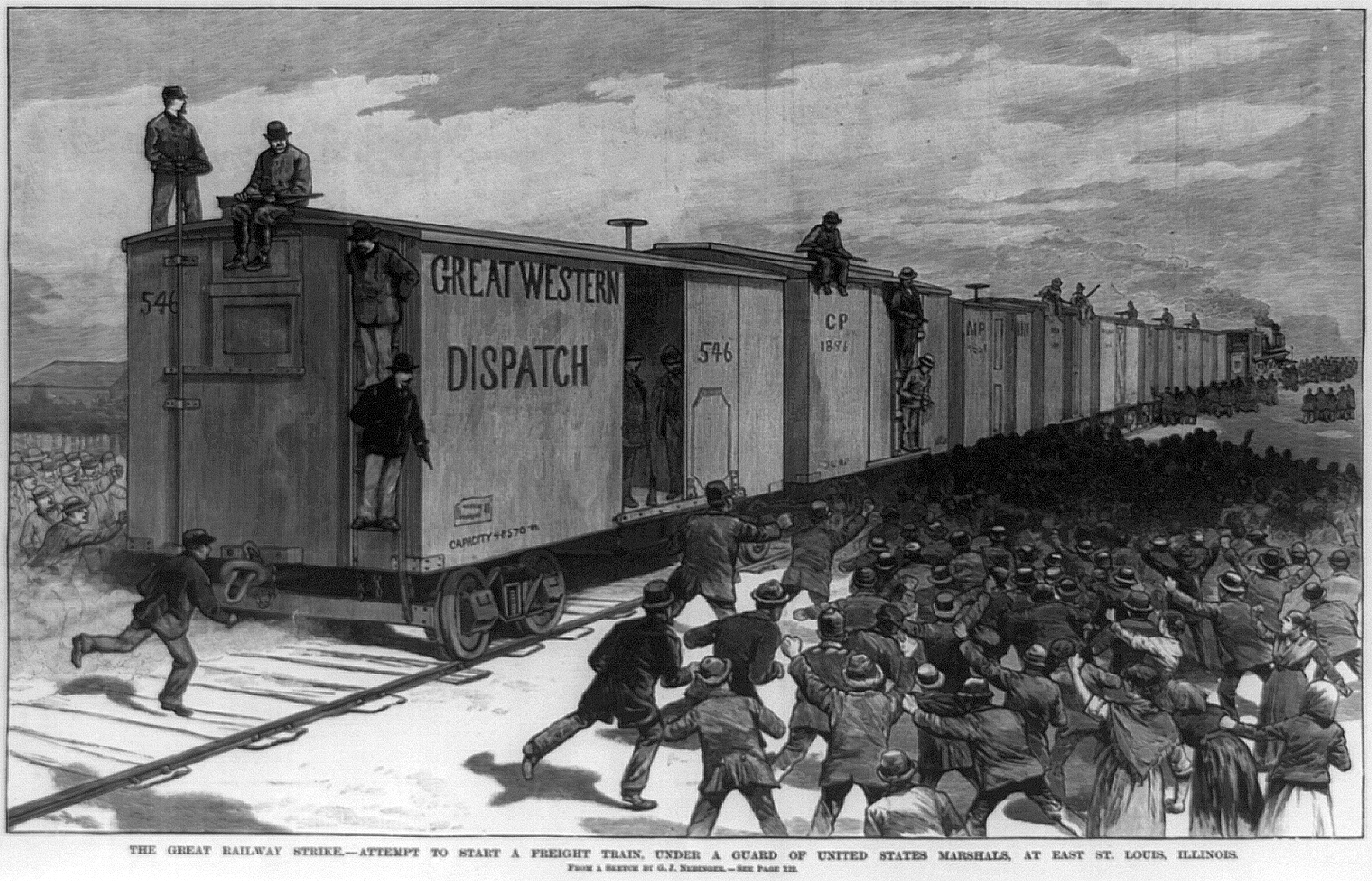
The Great Southwest Railroad Strike of 1886 was a trade union strike involving more than 200,000 workers.

With the rapid growth and consolidation of large railroad systems after 1870, union organizations sprang up, covering the entire nation. By 1901, 17 major railway brotherhoods were in operation; they generally worked amicably with management, which recognized their usefulness. Key unions included the Brotherhood of Locomotive Engineers (BLE), Brotherhood of Maintenance of Way Division (BMWED), the Order of Railway Conductors, the Brotherhood of Locomotive Firemen, and the Brotherhood of Railroad Trainmen. Their main goal was building insurance and medical packages for their members, as well as negotiating work rules, such as those involving seniority and grievance procedures.

They were not members of the AFL, and fought off more radical rivals such as the Knights of Labor in the 1880s and the American Railroad Union in the 1890s. They consolidated their power in 1916, after threatening a national strike, by securing the Adamson Act, a federal law that provided 10 hours pay for an eight-hour day. At the end of World War I they promoted nationalization of the railroads, and conducted a national strike in 1919. Both programs failed, and the brotherhoods were largely stagnant in the 1920s. They generally were independent politically, but supported the third party campaign of Robert M. La Follette in 1924.

=== Knights of Labor ===
The first effective labor organization that was more than regional in membership and influence was the Knights of Labor, organized in 1869. The Knights believed in the unity of the interests of all producing groups and sought to enlist in their ranks not only all laborers but everyone who could be truly classified as a producer. The acceptance of all producers led to explosive growth after 1880. Under the leadership of Terence V. Powderly they championed a variety of causes, sometimes through political or cooperative ventures.

Powderly hoped to gain their ends through politics and education rather than through economic coercion. The Knights were especially successful in developing a working class culture, involving women, families, sports, and leisure activities and educational projects for the membership. The Knights strongly promoted their version of republicanism that stressed the centrality of free labor, preaching harmony and cooperation among producers, as opposed to parasites and speculators.

One of the earliest railroad strikes was also one of the most successful. In 1885, the Knights of Labor led railroad workers to victory against Jay Gould and his entire southwestern railway system, consisting of the Missouri Pacific Railroad and the Denver and Rio Grande Railway. In early 1886, the Knights were trying to coordinate 1,400 strikes involving over 600,000 workers spread over much of the country. The tempo had doubled over 1885, and involved peaceful as well as violent confrontations in many sectors, such as railroads, street railroads, and coal mining, with demands usually focused on the eight hour day. Suddenly, it all collapsed, largely because the Knights were unable to handle so much on their plate at once, and because they took a smashing blow in the aftermath of the Haymarket affair in May 1886 in Chicago.

The Haymarket affair started as a strike organized by the Knights at the McCormick Reaper Factory in Chicago. Along with the McCormick strike, on May 1, 80,000 mostly immigrant workers led a general strike in Chicago, along with 340,000 workers in the rest of the United States. Attending the strike were a rising movement of armed anarchists formed as a result of the police violence of the Great Railroad Strike of 1877. While beginning relatively peacefully, police and strikers began to clash. As strikers rallied against the McCormick plant, a team of political anarchists, who were not Knights, tried to piggyback support among striking Knights workers. A bomb exploded as police were dispersing a peaceful rally, killing seven policemen and wounding many others. The anarchists—who had built the bomb—were blamed. Their spectacular trial gained national attention. The Knights of Labor were seriously injured by the false accusation that the Knights promoted anarchistic violence. Some Knights locals transferred to the less radical and more respectable AFL unions or railroad brotherhoods.

=== American Federation of Labor ===
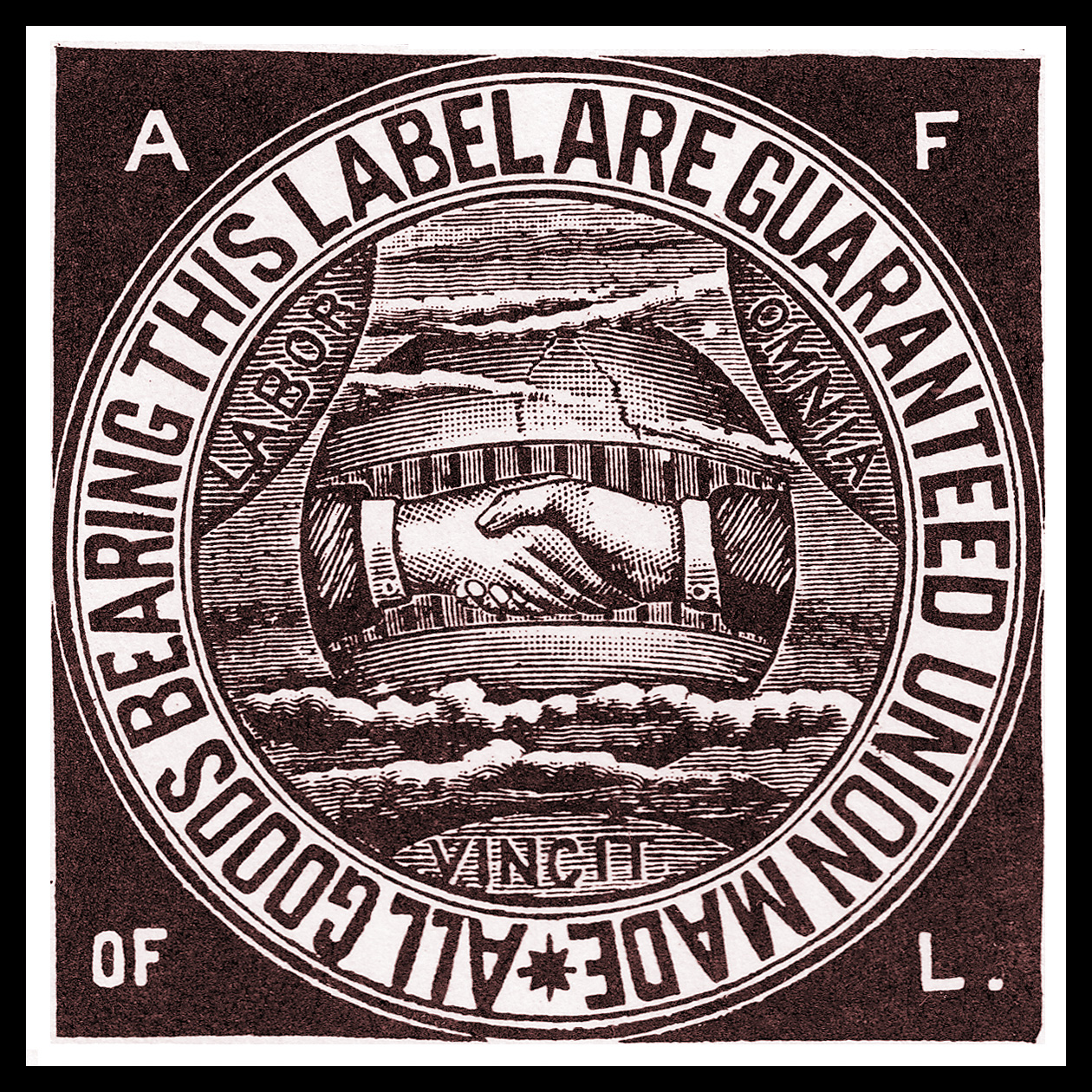
The American Federation of Labor union label, c. 1900

Samuel Gompers in 1894; he was the AFL leader 1886–1924.

The Federation of Organized Trades and Labor Unions began in 1881 under the leadership of Samuel Gompers. Like the National Labor Union, it was a federation of different unions and did not directly enroll workers. Its original goals were to encourage the formation of trade unions and to obtain legislation, such as prohibition of child labor, a national eight-hour workday, and exclusion of Chinese and other foreign contract workers.

Strikes organized by labor unions became routine events by the 1880s. There were 37,000 strikes between 1881 and 1905. By far the largest number were in the building trades, followed far behind by coal miners. The main goal was control of working conditions, setting uniform wage scales, protesting the firing of a member, and settling which rival union was in control. Most strikes were of very short duration. In times of depression strikes were more violent but less successful, because the company was losing money anyway. They were successful in times of prosperity when the company was losing profits and wanted to settle quickly.

The Federation made some efforts to obtain favorable legislation, but had little success in organizing or chartering new unions. It came out in support of the proposal, traditionally attributed to Peter J. McGuire of the Carpenters Union, for a national Labor Day holiday on the first Monday in September. It also threw itself behind the eight hour movement, which sought to limit the workday by either legislation or union negotiation.

In 1886, as the relations between the trade union movement and the Knights of Labor worsened, McGuire and other union leaders called for a convention to be held at Columbus, Ohio, on December 8. The Federation of Organized Trades and Labor Unions merged with the new organization, known as the American Federation of Labor or AFL, formed at that convention.

The AFL was formed in large part because of the dissatisfaction of many trade union leaders with the Knights of Labor, an organization that contained many trade unions and that had played a leading role in some of the largest strikes of the era. The new AFL distinguished itself from the Knights by emphasizing the autonomy of each trade union affiliated with it and limiting membership to workers and organizations made up of workers, unlike the Knights which, because of its producerist focus, welcomed some who were not wage workers. The AFL grew steadily in the late 19th century while the Knights all but disappeared. Although Gompers at first advocated something like industrial unionism, he retreated from that in the face of opposition from the craft unions that made up most of the AFL. The unions of the AFL were composed primarily of skilled men. Unskilled workers, African-Americans, Hispanics and women were generally excluded. The AFL saw women as threatening the jobs of men, since they often worked for lower wages.

=== Western Federation of Miners ===
The Western Federation of Miners (WFM) was created in 1893. Frequently in competition with the American Federation of Labor, the WFM spawned new federations, including the Western Labor Union (later renamed to the American Labor Union). The WFM took a conservative turn in the aftermath of the Colorado Labor Wars and the trials of its president, Charles Moyer, and its secretary treasurer, Big Bill Haywood, for the conspiratorial assassination of Idaho's former governor. Although both were found innocent, the WFM, headed by Moyer, separated itself from the Industrial Workers of the World (IWW) (launched by Haywood and other labor radicals, socialists, and anarchists in 1905) just a few years after that organization's founding convention. In 1916 the WFM became the International Union of Mine, Mill, and Smelter Workers, which was eventually absorbed by the United Steelworkers of America.

=== Pullman Strike ===
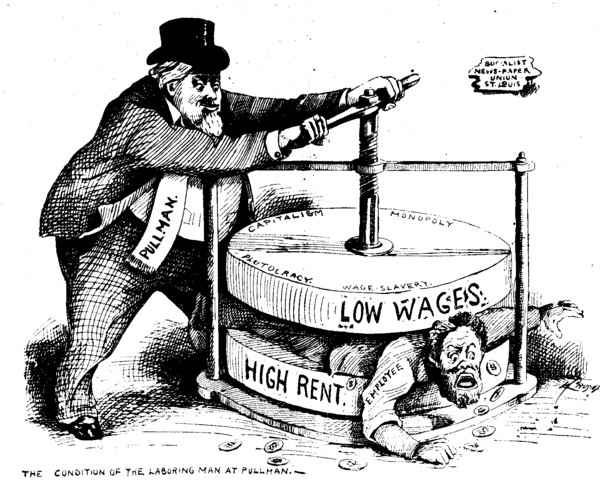
The condition of laboring man at Pullman, July 7, 1894

During the major economic depression of the early 1890s, the Pullman Palace Car Company cut wages in its factories. Discontented workers joined the American Railway Union (ARU), led by Eugene V. Debs, which supported their strike by launching a boycott of all Pullman cars on all railroads. ARU members across the nation refused to switch Pullman cars onto trains. When these switchmen were disciplined, the entire ARU struck the railroads on June 26, 1894. Within four days, 125,000 workers on twenty-nine railroads had people quit work rather than handle Pullman cars. Strikers and their supporters also engaged in riots and sabotage.

The railroads were able to get Edwin Walker, general counsel for the Chicago, Milwaukee, and St. Paul Railway, appointed as a special federal attorney with responsibility for dealing with the strike. Walker went to federal court and obtained an injunction barring union leaders from supporting the boycott in any way. The court injunction was based on the Sherman Anti-Trust Act which prohibited "Every contract, combination in the form of trust or otherwise, or conspiracy, in restraint of trade or commerce among the several States". Debs and other leaders of the ARU ignored the injunction, and federal troops were called into action.

The strike was broken up by United States Marshals and some 2,000 United States Army troops, commanded by Nelson Miles, sent in by President Grover Cleveland on the premise that the strike interfered with the delivery of US Mail. During the course of the strike, 13 strikers were killed and 57 were wounded. An estimated $340,000 worth of property damage occurred during the strike. Debs went to prison for six months for violating the federal court order, and the ARU disintegrated.

== Organized labor, 1900–1920 ==
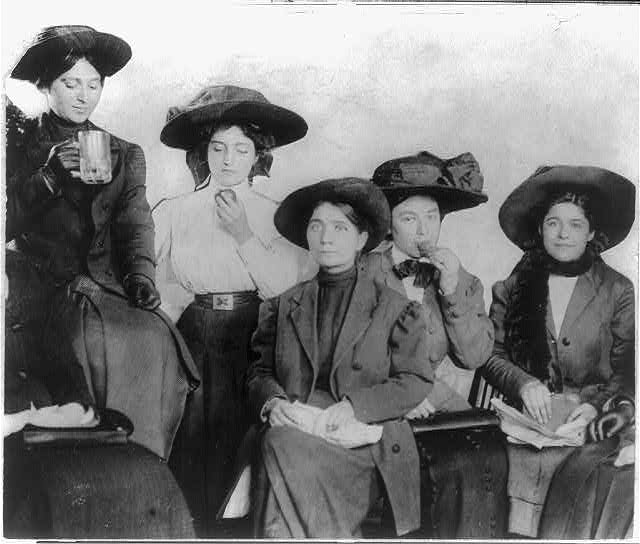
New York City shirtwaist workers on strike, taking a lunch break

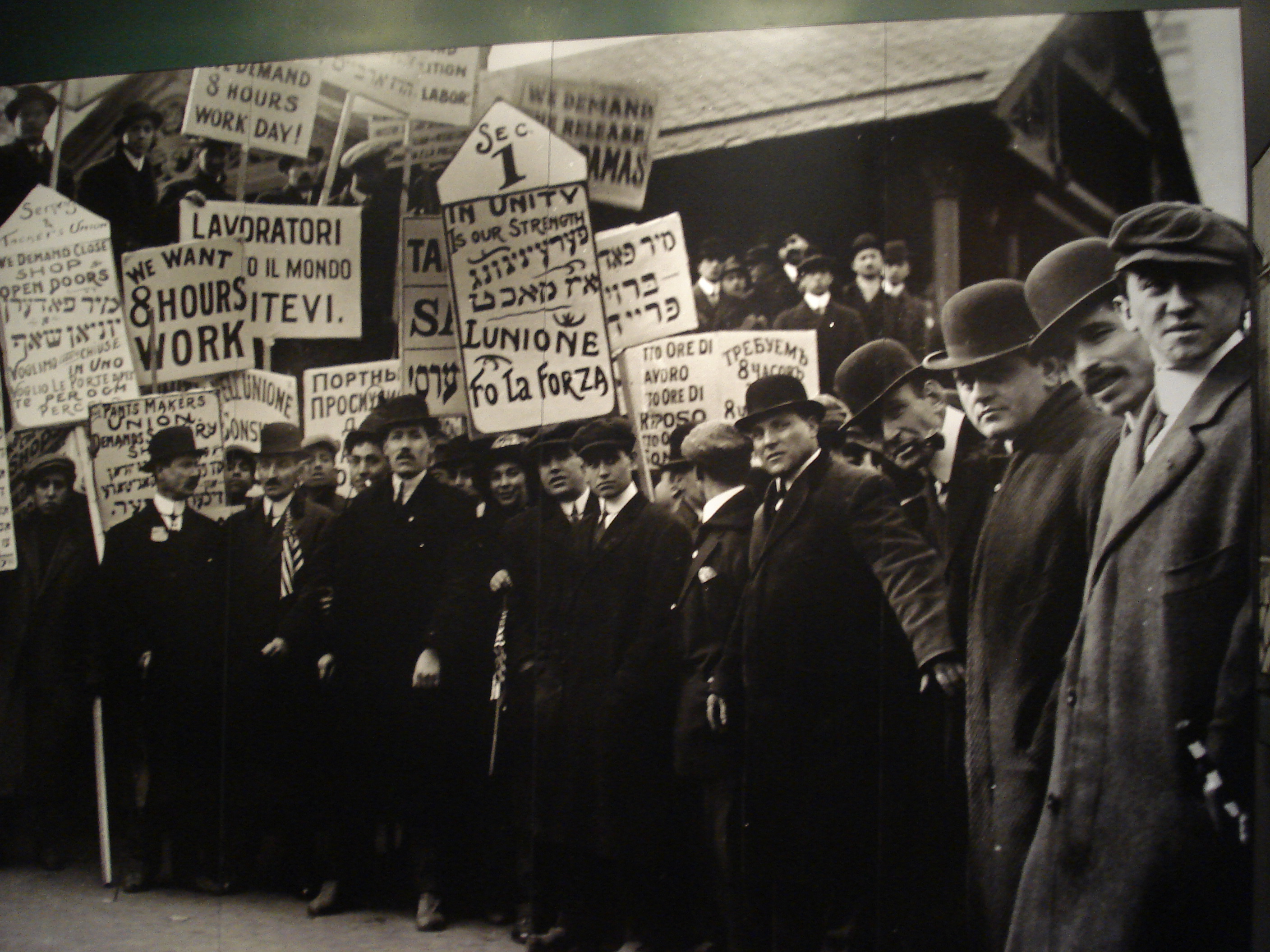
Garment workers on strike, c. 1913

Australian historian Peter Shergold confirms the findings of many scholars that the standard of living for US industrial workers was higher than in Europe. He compares wages and the standard of living in Pittsburgh with Birmingham, England. He finds that, after taking into account the cost of living (which was 65 percent higher in the US), the standard of living of unskilled workers was about the same in the two cities, while skilled workers had about twice as high a standard of living. The American advantage grew over time from 1890 to 1914, and there was a heavy steady flow of skilled workers from Britain to industrial America. Shergold revealed that skilled Americans did earn higher wages than the British, yet unskilled workers did not, while Americans worked longer hours, with a greater chance of injury, and had fewer social services.

American industry had the highest rate of accidents in the world. The US was also the only industrial power to have no workman's compensation program in place to support injured workers.

From 1860 to 1900, the wealthiest 2 percent of American households owned more than a third of the nation's wealth, while the top 10 percent owned roughly three-quarters of it. The bottom 40 percent had no wealth at all. In terms of property, the wealthiest 1 percent owned 51 percent, while the bottom 44 percent claimed 1.1 percent. Historian Howard Zinn argues that this disparity along with precarious working and living conditions for the working classes prompted the rise of populist, anarchist, and socialist movements. French economist Thomas Piketty notes that economists during this time, such as Willford I. King, were concerned that the United States was becoming increasingly inegalitarian to the point of becoming like old Europe, and "further and further away from its original pioneering ideal."

Nationwide from 1890 to 1914 the unionized wages in manufacturing rose from $17.63 a week to $21.37, and the average work week fell from 54.4 to 48.8 hours a week. The pay for all factory workers was $11.94 and $15.84 because unions reached only the more skilled factory workers.

=== Coal strikes, 1900–1902 ===
The United Mine Workers was successful in its strike against soft coal mines in the Midwest in 1900, but its strike against the hard coal mines of Pennsylvania turned into a national political crisis in 1902. President Theodore Roosevelt brokered a compromise solution that kept the flow of coal going, and higher wages and shorter hours, but it did not include recognition of the union as a bargaining agent.

=== Women's Trade Union League ===
The Women's Trade Union League, formed in 1903, was the first labor organization dedicated to helping working women. It did not organize them into locals; its goal was to support the AFL and encourage more women to join labor unions. It was composed of both working women and middle-class reformers, and provided financial assistance, moral support, and training in work skills and social refinement for blue-collar women. Most active in 1907–1922 under Margaret Dreier Robins, it publicized the cause and lobbied for minimum wages and restrictions on hours of work and child labor. Also under Dreier's leadership, they were able to pass crucial legislation for wage workers, and establish new safety regulations.

In 1911, a fire broke out in the Triangle Shirtwaist Factory in Manhattan, New York City. Due to the lack of fire safety measures in the building, 146 primarily female workers were killed in the incident. This incident led to a movement to increase safety measures in factories. It also was an opportunity for the Women's Trade Union League to open conversation for the conditions of women's workplaces in the labor movement.

=== Industrial Workers of the World ===
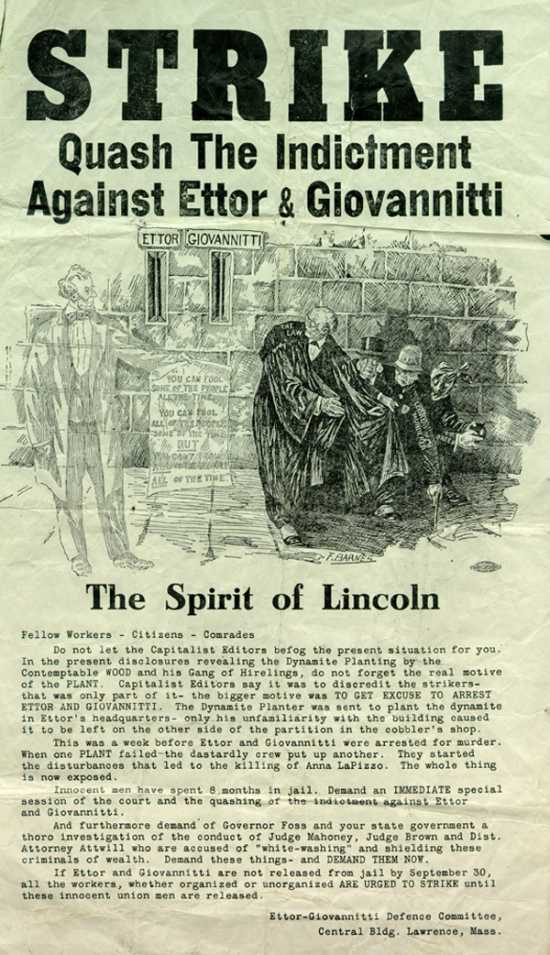
Flyer distributed in Lawrence, Massachusetts, September 1912. The Lawrence textile strike was a strike of immigrant workers.

The Industrial Workers of the World (IWW), whose members became known as "Wobblies", was founded in Chicago in 1905 by a group of about 30 labor radicals. Their most prominent leader was William "Big Bill" Haywood.

The IWW pioneered creative tactics and organized along the lines of industrial unionism rather than craft unionism; in fact, they went even further, pursuing the goal of "One Big Union" and the abolition of the wage system. Many, though not all, Wobblies favored anarcho-syndicalism.

Much of the IWW's organizing took place in the West, and most of its early members were miners, lumbermen, cannery, and dock workers. In 1912 the IWW organized a strike of more than twenty thousand textile workers, and by 1917 the Agricultural Workers Organization (AWO) of the IWW claimed a hundred thousand itinerant farm workers in the heartland of North America. Eventually the concept of One Big Union spread from dock workers to maritime workers, and thus was communicated to many different parts of the world. Dedicated to workplace and economic democracy, the IWW allowed men and women as members, and organized workers of all races and nationalities, without regard to current employment status. Its peak membership of 60,000, according to its secretary-treasurer, occurred in 1916. However, conservative estimates of the active membership in 1915 put it at 15,000 distributed among 150 local unions. Over 2000 locals were chartered and approximately 200,000 membership cards issued between 1905 and 1916. The organization was fiercely repressed during, and especially after, World War I with dozens of its members killed, hundreds of organizers imprisoned, and thousands more deported as foreign agitators. In 1927 the IWW also led a successful Colorado general coal strike for better conditions. The IWW proved that unskilled workers could be organized. The IWW exists today, but its most significant impact was during its first two decades of existence.

=== Government and labor ===
In 1908 the US Supreme Court decided Loewe v. Lawlor (the Danbury Hatters' Case). In 1902 the Hatters' Union instituted a nationwide boycott of the hats made by a nonunion company in Connecticut. Owner Dietrich Loewe brought suit against the union for unlawful combinations to restrain trade in violation of the Sherman Antitrust Act. The Court ruled that the union was subject to an injunction and liable for the payment of triple damages. In 1915 Justice Oliver Wendell Holmes, speaking for the Court, again decided in favor of Loewe, upholding a lower federal court ruling ordering the union to pay damages of $252,130. (The cost of lawyers had already exceeded $100,000, paid by the AFL). This was not a typical case in which a few union leaders were punished with short terms in jail; specifically, the life savings of several hundreds of the members were attached. The lower court ruling established a major precedent, and became a serious issue for the unions.

The Clayton Act of 1914 exempted unions from the antitrust prohibition and established for the first time the Congressional principle that "the labor of a human being is not a commodity or article of commerce". However, judicial interpretation so weakened it that prosecutions of labor under the antitrust acts continued until the enactment of the Norris-La Guardia Act in 1932.

State legislation 1912–1918: 36 states adopted the principle of workmen's compensation for all industrial accidents. Also: prohibition of the use of an industrial poison, several states require one day's rest in seven, the beginning of effective prohibition of night work, of maximum limits upon the length of the working day, and of minimum wage laws for women.

=== Colorado Coalfield War ===
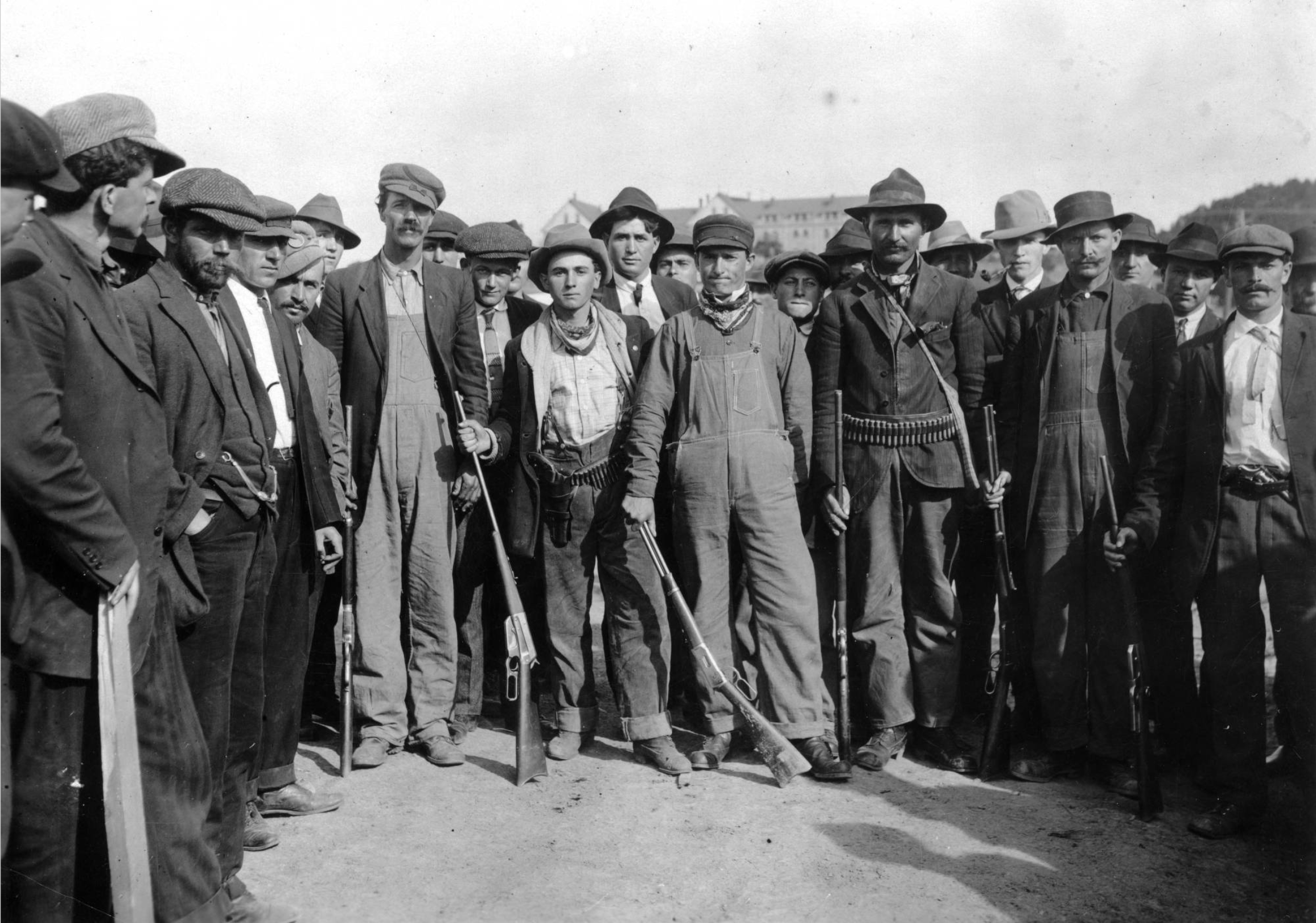
Armed strikers in front of the Mt. San Rafael Hospital, April 1914

On 23 September 1913, the United Mine Workers of America declared a strike against the Rockefeller-owned Colorado Fuel and Iron, in what is better known as the Colorado Coalfield War. The peak of the violence came after months of back-and-forth murders that culminated in the 20 April 1914 Ludlow Massacre that killed over a dozen women and children when Colorado National Guard opened fire on a striker encampment at Ludlow. The strike is considered the deadliest labor unrest in American history.

=== World War I ===
Samuel Gompers and nearly all labor unions were strong supporters of the war effort. They used their leverage to gain recognition and higher wages. They minimized strikes as wages soared and full employment was reached. To keep factories running smoothly, Wilson established the National War Labor Board in 1918, which forced management to negotiate with existing unions. The AFL unions and the railway brotherhoods strongly encouraged their young men to enlist in the United States Armed Forces. They fiercely opposed efforts to reduce recruiting and slow war production by the anti-war IWW and left-wing Socialists. President Wilson appointed Gompers to the powerful Council of National Defense, where he set up the War Committee on Labor. The AFL membership soared to 2.4 million in 1917. Anti-war socialists controlled the IWW, which fought against the war effort and was in turn shut down by legal action of the federal government.

==== Women in the labor force ====
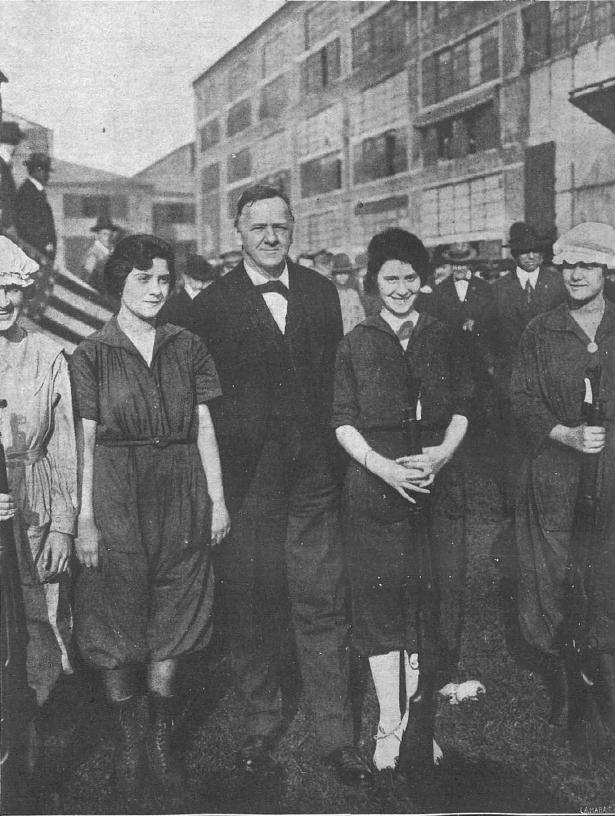
The Secretary of the Navy with female munition workers from New York

During WWI, large numbers of women were recruited into jobs that had either been vacated by men who had gone to fight in the war, or had been created as part of the war effort. The high demand for weapons and the overall wartime situation resulted in munitions factories collectively becoming the largest employer of American women by 1918. While there was initial resistance to hiring women for jobs traditionally held by men, the war made the need for labor so urgent that women were hired in large numbers and the government even actively promoted the employment of women in war-related industries through recruitment drives. As a result, women not only began working in heavy industry, but also took other jobs traditionally reserved solely for men, such as railway guards, ticket collectors, bus and tram conductors, postal workers, police officers, firefighters, and clerks.

World War I saw women taking traditionally men's jobs in large numbers for the first time in American history. Many women worked on the assembly lines of factories, producing trucks and munitions, while department stores employed African American women as elevator operators and cafeteria waitresses for the first time. The Food Administration helped housewives prepare more nutritious meals with less waste and with optimum use of the foods available. Morale of women remained high, as millions joined the Red Cross as volunteers to help soldiers and their families, and with rare exceptions, women did not protest the draft.

The United States Department of Labor created a Women in Industry group, headed by prominent labor researcher and social scientist Mary van Kleeck. This group helped develop standards for women who were working in industries connected to the war, alongside the War Labor Policies Board, of which van Kleeck was also a member. After the war, the Women in Industry Service group developed into the US Women's Bureau, headed by Mary Anderson.

===== Women of color =====
Women of color played a significant role in the American labor movement of the 20th century, helping to advance workers' rights in a variety of workplace environments, including fields, factories, and homes. They used instruments including labor unions, strikes, and legislative campaigning to improve their working conditions, pay, and hours. These women took part in neighborhood projects addressing labor rights in addition to being involved in the women's suffrage and civil rights movements. Their principal battle was for equal treatment in society. A famous leader of the African-American community was Ella Baker who helped organize the Young Negroes Cooperative League in the early 1930s, a group that was help pool community resources and provide cheaper goods and services to members. She later cofounded In Friendship, an organization that raised money for the civil rights movement. She went on to help form the Southern Christian Leadership Conference, and the Student Nonviolent Coordinating Committee. Two other important leaders, Dorothy Height—who worked to help improve opportunities for African-American women—and activist Dolores Huerta—who lobbied on behalf of migrant farmers and eventually founded the United Farm Workers of America—were also essential in promoting social justice and fair labor standards. Their combined efforts made a big difference in creating a more diverse and equal workplace.

===== Jewish women =====
Jewish women played a significant role in the American labor movement of the 20th century. Jewish mass immigration came to the United States, especially New York City and Chicago, in the early twentieth century, just as the ready-made clothing industry skyrocketed. Women who worked in garment factories were often subject to sexual harassment, unsafe conditions, exploitation, and wage discrimination. And yet, as Jews who emerged from a left-wing progressive tradition, these female garment workers nurtured a commitment to social justice, one that served as the catalyst for the labor organizing that these women later led. A number of unions were created on the Lower East Side during the beginning of the 20th century. Most were organized by the International Ladies Garment Workers Union, an organization that was founded in 1900 and, while initially founded by and only accessible to men, went on to be run by many Jewish women who advocated for education as a means of shaping a society that could support the working class. Strikes in the women's garment industry occurred almost yearly in one city or another. A notable example took place in 1909 and was led by Rose Schneiderman. Schneiderman worked as a cap maker in New York City and, after encountering poor working conditions, decided to organize a local union of the United Cloth and Cap Makers in New York City. Soon after, Schneiderman began serving as vice president of the New York Women's Trade Union League, where she organized the "Uprising of the 20,000" a landmark garment workers' strike that took place from 1909 to 1910 and eventually led to basic improvements for workers.

=== Strikes of 1919 ===
In 1919, the AFL tried to make their gains permanent and called a series of major strikes in meat, steel, and many other industries. Management counterattacked, claiming that key strikes were run by Communists intent on destroying capitalism. Nearly all the strikes ultimately failed, forcing unions back to positions similar to those around 1910.

==== Coal strike of 1919 ====
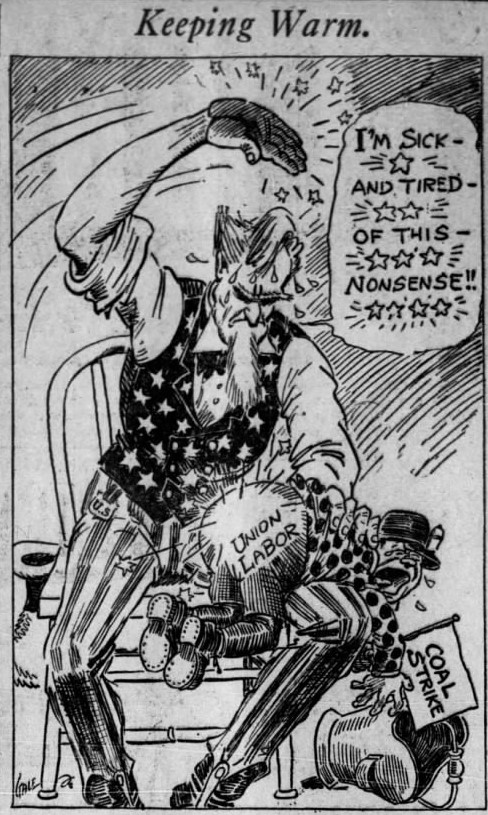
"Keeping Warm": the Los Angeles Times, a conservative newspaper, demands federal action to stop the coal strike, November 22, 1919.

The United Mine Workers under John L. Lewis called a strike for November 1, 1919, in all soft (bituminous) coal fields. They had agreed to a wage agreement to run until the end of World War I and now sought to make permanent their wartime gains. US Attorney General A. Mitchell Palmer invoked the Lever Act, a wartime measure that made it a crime to interfere with the production or transportation of necessities. Ignoring the court order 400,000 coal workers walked out. The coal operators played the radical card, saying Vladimir Lenin and Leon Trotsky had ordered the strike and were financing it, and some of the press echoed that language.

Lewis, facing criminal charges and sensitive to the propaganda campaign, withdrew his strike call. Lewis did not fully control the faction-ridden UAW and many locals ignored his call. As the strike dragged on into its third week, supplies of the nation's main fuel were running low and the public called for ever stronger government action. Final agreement came after five weeks with the miners getting a 14 percent raise.

==== Women telephone operators win strike in 1919 ====
One important strike was won by labor. Moved to action by the rising cost of living, the president of the Boston Telephone Operator's Union, Julia O'Connor, asked for higher wages from the New England Telephone Company. Wages of operators averaged a third less than women in manufacturing. In April, 9,000 women operators in New England went on strike, shutting down most telephone service. The company hired college students as strikebreakers, but they came under violent attack by men supporting the strikers. In a few days a settlement was reached giving higher wages. After the success O'Connor began a national campaign to organize women operators.

== Weakness of organized labor, 1920–1929 ==
The 1920s marked a period of sharp decline for the labor movement. Union membership and activities fell sharply due to many factors including generalized economic prosperity, a lack of leadership within the movement, and anti-union sentiments from employers, governments and the general population. Labor unions were much less able to organize strikes. In 1919, more than 4 million workers (or 21 percent of the labor force) participated in about 3,600 strikes. In contrast, 1929 witnessed about 289,000 workers (or 1.2 percent of the labor force) stage only 900 strikes. The aftermath of the 1910 Los Angeles Times Bombing also contributed to a widespread decline in unionization. The bombing, one of dozens of terrorist sabotage events nationwide organized by members of the International Association of Bridge and Structural Iron Workers, killed 21 and injured over 100. The guilty verdicts "devastated the American labor movement, virtually paralyzing it until the New Deal."

After a short recession in 1920, the 1920s was a generally prosperous decade outside of farming and coal mining. The GNP growth 1921–29 was a very strong 6.0 percent, double the long-term average of about 3 percent. Real annual earnings (in 1914 dollars) for all employees (deducting for unemployment) was $566 in 1921 and $793 in 1929, a real gain of 40 percent. The economic prosperity of the decade led to stable prices, eliminating one major incentive to join unions. Unemployment fell from 11.7 percent in 1921 to 2.4 percent in 1923 and remained in the range of 2 to 5 percent until 1930.

The 1920s also saw a lack of strong leadership within the labor movement. Samuel Gompers of the American Federation of Labor died in 1924 after serving as the organization's president for 37 years. Observers said successor William Green, who was the secretary-treasurer of the United Mine Workers, "lacked the aggressiveness and the imagination of the AFL's first president". The AFL was down to less than 3 million members in 1925 after hitting a peak of 4 million members in 1920.

Employers across the nation led a successful campaign against unions known as the "American Plan", which sought to depict unions as "alien" to the nation's individualistic spirit. In addition, some employers, like the National Association of Manufacturers, used Red Scare tactics to discredit unionism by linking them to subversive activities.

US courts were less hospitable to union activities during the 1920s than in the past. In this decade, corporations used twice as many court injunctions against strikes than any comparable period. In addition, the practice of forcing employees (by threat of termination) to sign yellow-dog contracts that said they would not join a union was not outlawed until 1932.

Although the labor movement fell in prominence during the 1920s, the Great Depression would ultimately bring it back to life.

=== Battle of Blair Mountain ===
The Battle of Blair Mountain, August 25, 1921 – September 2, 1921, was the largest labor uprising in United States history. The conflict occurred in Logan County, West Virginia, as part of the Coal Wars, a series of early-20th-century labor disputes in Appalachia. For five days from late August to early September 1921, some 10,000 armed coal miners confronted 3,000 lawmen and strikebreakers recruited and backed by coal mine operators during the miners' attempt to unionize the southwestern West Virginia coalfields. The battle ended after the United States Army, represented by the West Virginia Army National Guard, intervened by presidential order, and the miners, many of whom were veterans, declined to shoot at the soldiers. In the short term the battle was an overwhelming victory for coal industry owners and management. United Mine Workers of America membership plummeted from more than 50,000 miners to only 10,000 over the next several years.

=== New England Textile Strike of 1922 ===
The New England Textile strike was widespread textile mill strike throughout New England, starting on January 23. Anywhere from 40,000 to 68,000 workers struck and it lasted until around November for most mills. The immediate cause was a proposal for a 20% wage cut and increased working hours. The strike led to a reversal of the wage cut for most workers.

=== Great Railroad Strike of 1922 ===
The Great Railroad Strike of 1922, a nationwide railroad shop workers strike, began on July 1. The immediate cause of the strike was the Railroad Labor Board's announcement that hourly wages for railway repair and maintenance workers would be cut by seven cents on July 1. This cut, which represented an average 12 percent wage decrease for the affected workers, prompted a shop workers vote on whether or not to strike. The operators' union did not join in the strike, and the railroads employed strikebreakers to fill three-fourths of the roughly 400,000 vacated positions, increasing hostilities between the railroads and the striking workers.

On September 1, a federal judge issued the sweeping "Daugherty Injunction" against striking, assembling, and picketing. Unions bitterly resented the injunction; a few sympathy strikes shut down some railroads completely. The strike eventually died out as many shopmen made deals with the railroads on the local level. The often unpalatable concessions — coupled with memories of the violence and tension during the strike — soured relations between the railroads and the shopmen for years.

== Organized labor, 1929–1955 ==
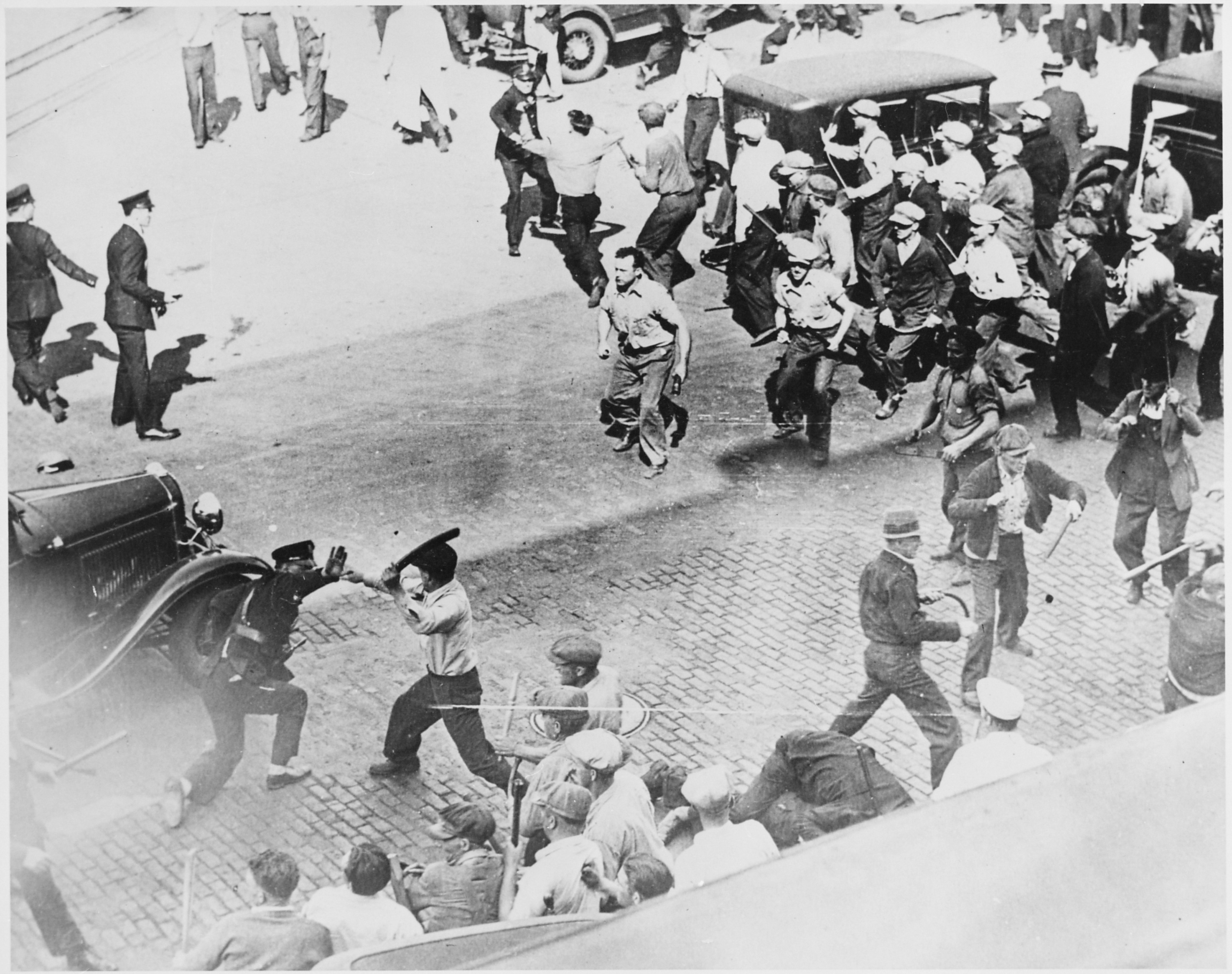
Open battle between striking teamsters armed with pipes and the police in the streets of Minneapolis in June 1934

=== The Great Depression and organized labor ===
The stock market crashed in October 1929, and ushered in the Great Depression. By the winter of 1932–33, the economy was so perilous that the unemployment rate hit the 25 percent mark. Unions lost members during this time because laborers could not afford to pay their dues and furthermore, numerous strikes against wage cuts left the unions impoverished: "one might have expected a reincarnation of organizations seeking to overthrow the capitalistic system that was now performing so poorly. Some workers did indeed turn to such radical movements as the Communist Party, but, in general, the nation seemed to have been shocked into inaction".

Though unions were not acting yet, cities across the nation witnessed local and spontaneous marches by frustrated relief applicants. In March 1930, hundreds of thousands of unemployed workers marched through New York City, Detroit, Washington, San Francisco and other cities in a mass protest organized by the Communist Party's Unemployed Councils. In 1931, more than 400 relief protests erupted in Chicago and that number grew to 550 in 1932.

The leadership behind these organizations often came from radical groups like Communist and Socialist parties, who wanted to organize "unfocused neighborhood militancy into organized popular defense organizations".

However the Great Depression spawned labor action in Harlan County, Kentucky, now known as the Harlan County War, when the Harlan County Coal Operators Association cut wages by 10% in the winter of 1931. This decision had caused the United Mine Workers to organize, leading to the eviction of the mine workers from the coal town. These evicted workers immigrated to the town of Evarts, Kentucky, where they would plan union activity. Sheriff J. H. Blair led a force of 140 deputies who were mostly paid by the coal company. Various skirmishes between striking miners and deputies ensued in Evarts. As the situation escalated, socialist organizations such as the Industrial Workers of the World sent aid to the miners, giving it national coverage.

=== The Norris–La Guardia Anti-Injunction Act of 1932 ===
Organized labor became more active in 1932, with the passage of the Norris–La Guardia Act. On March 23, 1932, Republican President Herbert Hoover signed the Norris–La Guardia Act, marking the first of many pro-union bills that Washington would pass in the 1930s. Also known as the Anti-Injunction Bill, it offered procedural and substantive protections against the easy issuance of court injunctions during labor disputes, which had limited union behavior in the 1920s. Although the act only applied to federal courts, numerous states would pass similar acts in the future. Additionally, the act outlawed yellow-dog contracts, which were documents some employers forced their employees to sign to ensure they would not join a union; employees who refused to sign were terminated from their jobs.

The passage of the Norris–La Guardia Act signified a victory for the American Federation of Labor, which had been lobbying Congress to pass it for slightly more than five years. It also marked a large change in public policy. Up until the passage of this act, the collective bargaining rights of workers were severely hampered by judicial control.

=== FDR and the National Industrial Recovery Act ===
President Franklin D. Roosevelt took office on March 4, 1933, and immediately began implementing programs to alleviate the economic crisis. In June, he passed the National Industrial Recovery Act, which gave workers the right to organize into unions. Though it contained other provisions, like minimum wage and maximum hours, its most significant passage was, "Employees shall have the right to organize and bargain collectively through representative of their own choosing, and shall be free from the interference, restraint, or coercion of employers."

This portion, which was known as Section 7(a), was symbolic to workers in the United States because it stripped employers of their rights to either coerce them or refuse to bargain with them. While no power of enforcement was written into the law, it "recognized the rights of the industrial working class in the United States".

For example, the now United Mine Workers of America were able to reignite the coal labor movement in Kentucky and West Virginia with Section 7(a) and eliminated compulsory residence in company towns for 350,000 miners.

Although the National Industrial Recovery Act was ultimately deemed unconstitutional by the Supreme Court in 1935 and replaced by the Wagner Act two months after that, it fueled workers to join unions and strengthened those organizations.

In response to both the Norris–La Guardia Act and the NIRA, workers who were previously unorganized in a number of industries—such as rubber workers, oil and gas workers and service workers—began to look for organizations that would allow them to band together. The NIRA strengthened workers' resolve to unionize and instead of participating in unemployment or hunger marches, they started to participate in strikes for union recognition in various industries". In 1933, the number of work stoppages jumped to 1,695, double its figure from 1932. In 1934, 1,865 strikes occurred, involving more than 1.4 million workers.

The elections of 1934 might have reflected the "radical upheaval sweeping the country", as Roosevelt won the greatest majority either party ever held in the Senate and 322 Democrats won seats in the United States House of Representatives versus 103 Republicans. It is possible that "the great social movement from below thus strengthened the independence of the executive branch of government".

Despite the impact of such changes on the United States' political structure and on workers' empowerment, some scholars have criticized the impacts of these policies from a classical economic perspective. Cole and Ohanian (2004) find that the New Deal's pro-labor policies are an important factor in explaining the weak recovery from the Great Depression and the rise in real wages in some industrial sectors during this time.

=== The American Federation of Labor: craft unionism vs. industrial unionism ===
The AFL was growing rapidly, from 2.1 million members in 1933 to 3.4 million in 1936. But it was experiencing severe internal stresses regarding how to organize new members. Traditionally, the AFL organized unions by craft rather than industry, where electricians or stationary engineers would form their own skill-oriented unions, rather than join a large automobile-making union. Most AFL leaders, including president William Green, were reluctant to shift from the organization's long-standing craft unionism and started to clash with other leaders within the organization, such as John L. Lewis.

The issue came up at the annual AFL convention in San Francisco in 1934 and 1935, but the majority voted against a shift to industrial unionism both years. After the defeat at the 1935 convention, nine leaders from the industrial faction led by Lewis met and organized the Committee for Industrial Organization within the AFL to "encourage and promote organization of workers in the mass production industries" for "educational and advisory" functions.

The CIO, which later changed its name to the Congress of Industrial Organizations (CIO), formed unions with the hope of bringing them into the AFL, but the AFL refused to extend full membership privileges to CIO unions. In 1938, the AFL expelled the CIO and its million members, and they formed a rival federation. The two federations fought it out for membership; while both supported Roosevelt and the New Deal, the CIO was further to the left, while the AFL had close ties to the big city machines.

=== John L. Lewis and the CIO ===
John L. Lewis was the president of the United Mine Workers of America (UMW) from 1920 to 1960, and the driving force behind the founding of the Congress of Industrial Organizations (CIO). Using UMW organizers the new CIO established the United Steel Workers of America (USWA) and organized millions of other industrial workers in the 1930s.

Lewis threw his support behind Franklin D. Roosevelt (FDR) at the outset of the New Deal. After the passage of the Wagner Act in 1935, Lewis traded on the tremendous appeal that Roosevelt had with workers in those days, sending organizers into the coal fields to tell workers "The President wants you to join the Union." His UMW was one of FDR's main financial supporters in 1936, contributing over $500,000.

Lewis expanded his base by organizing the so-called "captive mines", those held by the steel producers such as US Steel. That required in turn organizing the steel industry, which had defeated union organizing drives in 1892 and 1919 and which had resisted all organizing efforts since then fiercely. The task of organizing steelworkers, on the other hand, put Lewis at odds with the AFL, which looked down on both industrial workers and the industrial unions that represented all workers in a particular industry, rather than just those in a particular skilled trade or craft.

Lewis was the first president of the Committee of Industrial Organizations. Lewis, in fact, was the CIO: his UMWA provided the great bulk of the financial resources that the CIO poured into organizing drives by the United Automobile Workers (UAW), the United Steelworkers of America, the Textile Workers Union and other newly formed or struggling unions. Lewis hired back many of the people he had exiled from the UMWA in the 1920s to lead the CIO and placed his protégé Philip Murray at the head of the Steel Workers Organizing Committee.

The most dramatic success was the 1936-7 sit-down strike that paralyzed General Motors. It enabled CIO unionization of GM and the main automobile firms (except the Ford Motor Company, which held out for a few years). However it had negative ramifications, as the Gallup Poll reported, "More than anything else the use of the sit-down strike alienated the sympathies of the middle classes".

The CIO's actual membership (as opposed to publicity figures) was 2,850,000 for February 1942. This included 537,000 members of the auto workers (UAW), nearly 500,000 Steel Workers, almost 300,000 members of the Amalgamated Clothing Workers, about 180,000 Electrical Workers, and about 100,000 Rubber Workers. The CIO also included 550,000 members of the United Mine Workers, which did not formally withdraw from the CIO until later in the year. The remaining membership of 700,000 was scattered among thirty-odd smaller unions.

Historians of the union movement in the 1930s have tried to explain its remarkable success in terms of the rank and file—what motivated them to suddenly rally around leaders (such as John L. Lewis) who had been around for decades with little success. Why was the militancy of the mid-1930s so short lived?

=== Union upsurge in World War II ===
Union membership grew very rapidly from 2.8 million in 1933 to 8.4 million in 1941, covering 23% of the non-farm workforce, reaching 14 million in 1945, about 36 percent of the work force. By the mid-1950s, the merged AFL-CIO still collected dues from over 15 million members, a third of the non-farm workforce. Unionization was strongest in large northern cities, and weakest across the south, where repeated mobilization efforts failed. The 1937 split off of the CIO cost the AFL over a million members, but it added 760,000 on its own. Between 1937 and 1945 the CIO recruited two million new members, but the AFL recruited nearly 4 million. After some bitter battles in the late 1930s, the AFL and CIO had relatively few jurisdictional disputes, each focusing on its own specialized industries. The CIO was strongest in large manufacturing industries especially auto, steel, meatpacking, coal, and electrical appliances. The AFL affiliates were strongest in construction trades, trucking, department stores, and public service. The railway brotherhoods continued their independent status.

Both the AFL and CIO supported Roosevelt in 1940 and 1944, with 75 percent or more of their votes, after spending millions of dollars, and mobilizing tens of thousands of precinct workers.

However, Lewis opposed Roosevelt on foreign policy grounds in 1940, but his members ignored his advice to voted against FDR and he resigned as CIO chief. During the 22 months between 1939-1941 when Stalin and Hitler supported each other, the far-left opposed American aid to Britain's war against Germany. They called strikes in war industries that were supplying Lend Lease to Britain. The most dramatic case came in early June 1941, when a wildcat strike near Los Angeles closed the plant that produced a fourth of the fighter-planes. With the approval of CIO leadership, President Roosevelt sent in the national guard to reopen the plant. However, when Germany suddenly invaded the USSR in late June 1941, the Communist activists suddenly became the strongest supporters of war production; they crushed wildcat strikes.

Lewis realized that he had enormous leverage over the nation's energy supply. In 1943, the middle of the war, when the rest of labor was observing a policy against strikes, Lewis led the coal miners out on a twelve-day strike for higher wages. The bipartisan Conservative coalition in Congress passed anti-union legislation over liberal opposition, most notably the Taft-Hartley Act of 1947.

A statistical analysis of the AFL and CIO national and local leaders in 1945 shows that opportunity for advancement in the labor movement was wide open. In contrast with other elites, the labor leaders did not come from established WASP families with rich, well-educated backgrounds. Indeed, they closely resembled the overall national population of adult men, with fewer from the South and from farm backgrounds. The union leaders were heavily Democratic. The newer CIO had a younger leadership, and one more involved with third parties, and less involved with local civic activities. Otherwise the AFL and CIO leaders were quite similar in background.

=== Women take new jobs in World War II ===
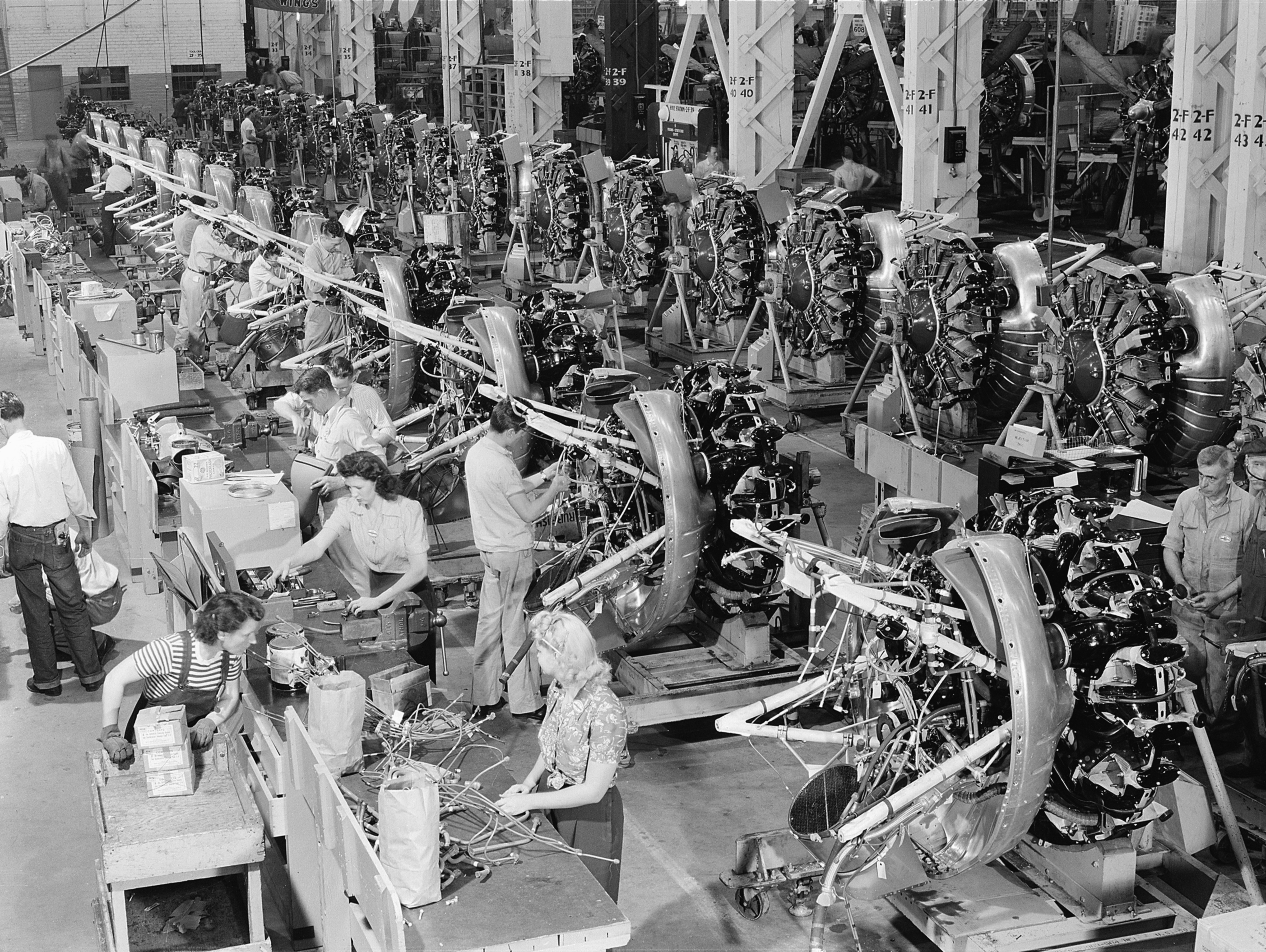
Women at work in the United States in World War II

The war caused the military mobilization of 16 million American men, leaving a huge hole in the urban work force. (Men in farming were exempt from the draft.) In 1945, 37% of women were employed, encouraged by factors such as patriotism and the chance for high wages. One in 4 married women were working by 1945. Many domestic workers took jobs that paid much better, especially in war factories. During the war nearly 6 million women joined the workforce. They filled roles that men had monopolized, such as steel workers, lumber workers, and bus drivers. By 1945 there were 4.7 women in clerical positions which was an 89% increase from 1940. Another 4.5 million women working in factories, usually in unskilled positions, up 112%. The aviation industry saw the highest increase in female workers during the war. By 1943 310,000 women worked there, or 65% of the industry's workforce.

While women's wages rose more relative to men's during this period, real wages did not increase due to higher wartime income taxes. Although jobs that had been previously closed to women opened up, demographics such as African American women who had already been participating more fully experienced less change. Their husbands' income effect was historically even more positive than white women's. During the war, African American women engagement as domestic servants decreased from 59.9% to 44.6%, but Karen Anderson in 1982 characterized their experience as "last hired, first fired."

At the end of the war, most of the munitions-making jobs ended. Many factories were closed; others retooled for civilian production. In some jobs, women were replaced by returning veterans who did not lose seniority because they were in service. However, the number of women at work in 1946 was 87% of the number in 1944, leaving 13% left the labor force to become housewives.

=== Walter Reuther and UAW ===
The Flint Sit-Down Strike of 1936–37 was the decisive event in the formation of the United Auto Workers Union (UAW). During the war Walter Reuther took control of the UAW, and soon led major strikes in 1946. He ousted the Communists from the positions of power, especially at the Ford local. He was one of the most articulate and energetic leaders of the CIO, and of the merged AFL-CIO. Using brilliant negotiating tactics he leveraged high profits for the Big Three automakers into higher wages and superior benefits for UAW members.

=== PAC and politics of 1940s ===
New enemies appeared for the labor unions after 1935. Newspaper columnist Westbrook Pegler was especially outraged by the New Deal's support for powerful labor unions that he considered morally and politically corrupt. Pegler saw himself a populist and muckraker whose mission was to warn the nation that dangerous leaders were in power. In 1941 Pegler became the first columnist ever to win a Pulitzer Prize for reporting, for his work in exposing racketeering in Hollywood labor unions, focusing on the criminal career of William Morris Bioff. Pegler's popularity reflected a loss of support for unions and liberalism generally, especially as shown by the dramatic Republican gains in the 1946 elections, often using an anti-union theme.

==== Strike wave of 1945 ====
With the end of the war in August 1945 came a wave of major strikes, mostly led by the CIO. In November, the UAW sent their 180,000 GM workers to the picket lines; they were joined in January 1946 by a half-million steelworkers, as well as over 200,000 electrical workers and 150,000 packinghouse workers. Combined with many smaller strikes a new record of strike activity was set.

The results were mixed, with the unions making some gains, but the economy was disordered by the rapid termination of war contracts, the complex reconversion to peacetime production, the return to the labor force of 12 million servicemen, and the return home of millions of women workers. The conservative control of Congress blocked liberal legislation, and "Operation Dixie", the CIO's efforts to expand massively into the Southern United States, failed.

The Republican Party exploited public anger at the unions in 1946, winning a smashing landslide. Labor responded afterwards by taking strong actions. The CIO systematically purged communists and far-left sympathizers from leadership roles in its unions. The CIO expelled some unions that resisted the purge, notably its third-largest affiliate the United Electrical, Radio and Machine Workers of America (UE), and set up a new rival IUE to take away the UE membership.

Meanwhile, the AFL in 1947 set up its first explicitly political unit, Labor's League for Political Education. The AFL increasingly abandoned its historic tradition of nonpartisanship, since neutrality between the major parties was impossible. By 1952, the AFL had given up on decentralization, local autonomy, and non-partisanship, and had developed instead a new political approach marked by the same style of centralization, national coordination, and partisan alliances that characterized the CIO. After these moves, the CIO and AFL were in a good position to fight off Henry Wallace in the 1948 presidential election and work enthusiastically for Harry S. Truman's reelection. The CIO and AFL no longer had major points of conflict, so they merged amicably in 1955 as the AFL–CIO.

=== Taft-Hartley Act ===
The Labor Management Relations Act of 1947, also known as the Taft–Hartley Act, revised the Wagner Act to include restrictions on unions as well as management. It was a response to public demands for action after the wartime coal strikes and the postwar strikes in steel, autos and other industries that were perceived to have damaged the economy, as well as a threatened 1946 railroad strike that was called off at the last minute before it shut down the national economy. The Act was bitterly fought by unions, vetoed by President Harry S. Truman, and passed over his veto. Repeated union efforts to repeal or modify it always failed, and it remains in effect today.

The Act was sponsored by Senator Robert A. Taft and Representative Fred Hartley, both Republicans. Congress overrode the veto on June 23, 1947, establishing the act as a law. Truman described the act as a "slave-labor bill" in his veto, but after it was enacted over his veto, he used its emergency provisions a number of times to halt strikes and lockouts. The new law required all union officials to sign an affidavit that they were not Communists or else the union would lose its federal bargaining powers guaranteed by the National Labor Relations Board. (That provision was declared to be an unconstitutional bill of attainder by a 1965 Supreme Court decision, United States v. Brown.)

The Taft-Hartley Act amended the Wagner Act, officially known as the National Labor Relations Act, of 1935. The amendments added to the NLRA a list of prohibited actions, or "unfair labor practices", on the part of unions. The NLRA had previously prohibited only unfair labor practices committed by employers. It prohibited jurisdictional strikes, in which a union strikes in order to pressure an employer to assign particular work to the employees that union represents, and secondary boycotts and "common situs" picketing, in which unions picket, strike, or refuse to handle the goods of a business with which they have no primary dispute but which is associated with a targeted business. A later statute, the Labor Management Reporting and Disclosure Act, passed in 1959, tightened these restrictions on secondary boycotts still further.

The Act outlawed closed shops, which were contractual agreements that required an employer to hire only union members. Union shops, in which new recruits must join the union within a certain amount of time, are permitted, but only as part of a collective bargaining agreement and only if the contract allows the worker at least thirty days after the date of hire or the effective date of the contract to join the union. The National Labor Relations Board and the courts have added other restrictions on the power of unions to enforce union security clauses and have required them to make extensive financial disclosures to all members as part of their duty of fair representation. On the other hand, a few years after the passage of the Act Congress repealed the provisions requiring a vote by workers to authorize a union shop, when it became apparent that workers were approving them in virtually every case. The amendments also authorized individual states to outlaw union security clauses entirely in their jurisdictions by passing "right-to-work" laws. Currently all of the states in the Deep South and a number of traditionally Republican states in the Midwest, Plains and Rocky Mountains regions have right-to-work laws. The amendments required unions and employers to give sixty days' notice before they may undertake strikes or other forms of economic action in pursuit of a new collective bargaining agreement; it did not, on the other hand, impose any "cooling-off period" after a contract expired. Although the Act also authorized the president to intervene in strikes or potential strikes that create a national emergency, the president has used that power less and less frequently in each succeeding decade.

Historian James T. Patterson concludes that:

By the 1950s most observers agreed that Taft-Hartley was no more disastrous for workers than the Wagner Act had been for employers. What ordinarily mattered most in labor relations was not government laws such as Taft-Hartley, but the relative power of unions and management in the economic marketplace. Where unions were strong they usually managed all right; when they were weak, new laws did them little additional harm.

=== Anti-communism ===
The AFL had always opposed communists inside the labor movement. After 1945 they took their crusade worldwide. The CIO had major communist elements who played a key role in organizational work in the late 1930s and war years. By 1949 they were purged. The AFL and CIO strongly supported the Cold War policies of the Truman administration, including the Truman Doctrine, the Marshall Plan and NATO.

Left-wing elements in the CIO protested and were forced out of the main unions. Walter Reuther of the United Automobile Workers purged the UAW of communist members. He was active in the CIO umbrella as well, taking the lead in expelling eleven communist-dominated unions from the CIO in 1949. As a leader of the anti-communist center-left, Reuther was a founder of the liberal umbrella group Americans for Democratic Action in 1947. In 1949 he led the CIO delegation to the London conference that set up the International Confederation of Free Trade Unions in opposition to the communist-dominated World Federation of Trade Unions. He had left the Socialist Party in 1939, and throughout the 1950s and 1960s was a leading spokesman for liberal interests in the CIO and in the Democratic Party. James B. Carey also helped influence the CIO's pullout from the WFTU and the formation of the International Confederation of Free Trade Unions dedicated to promoting free trade and democratic unionism worldwide. Carey in 1949 had formed the International Union of Electrical Workers, a new CIO union for electrical workers, because the old one, the United Electrical, Radio and Machine Workers of America, was tightly held by the left.

Marxian economist Richard D. Wolff argues that anti-communism was part of a strategy by big business, Republicans and conservatives to single out and destroy the members of the coalition that forced through the New Deal, namely organized labor, socialist and communist parties.

== Union decline, 1955–2016 ==
Income inequality and union participation have had a distinctly inverse relationship, with the disparity increasing since the 1980s.

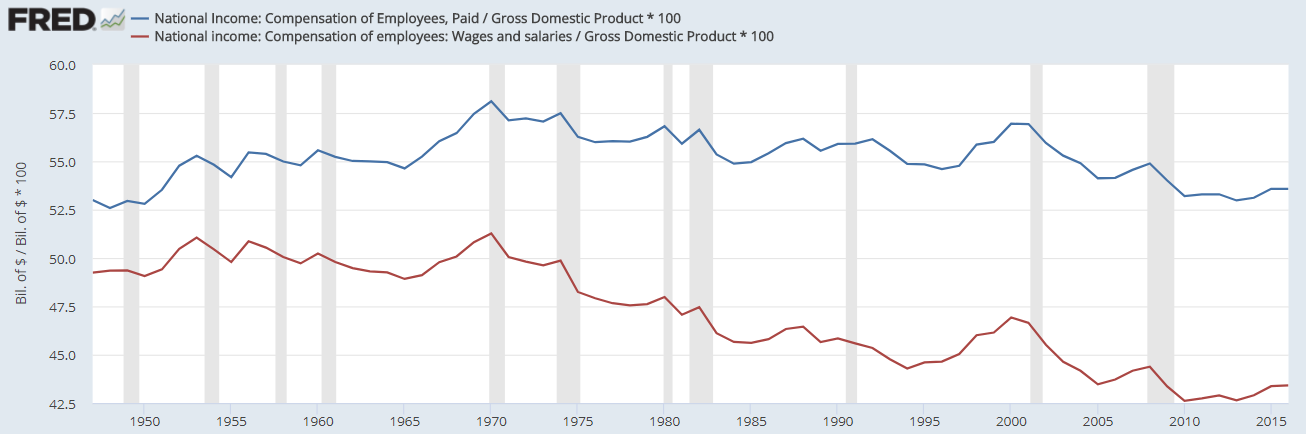
Labor income as a share of GDP (vs. income from capital) has declined 1970 to 2016, measured based on total compensation as well as salaries & wages. All employment is included, not just union members.

Since its peak in the mid-20th century, the American labor movement has been in steady decline, with losses in the private sector larger than gains in the public sector. In the early 1950s, as the AFL and CIO merged, around a third of the American labor force was unionized; by 2012, the proportion was 11 percent, constituting roughly 5 percent in the private sector and 40 percent in the public sector. Organized labor's influence steadily waned and workers' collective voice in the political process has weakened. Partly as a result, wages have stagnated and income inequality has increased. "Although the National Labor Relations Act was initially a boon for unions, it also sowed the seeds of the labor movement's decline. The act enshrined the right to unionize, but the system of workplace elections it created meant that unions had to organize each new factory or firm individually rather than organize by industry. In many European countries, collective-bargaining agreements extended automatically to other firms in the same industry, but in the United States, they usually reached no further than a plant's gates. As a result, in the first decades of the postwar period, the organizing effort could not keep pace with the frenetic rate of job growth in the economy as a whole". On the political front, the shrinking unions lost influence in the Democratic Party, and pro-union liberal Republicans faded away. Intellectuals lost interest in unions, focusing their attention more on the Vietnam War, minorities, women and environmental issues.

By the 1970s, a rapidly increasing flow of imports (such as automobiles, steel and electronics from Germany and Japan, and clothing and shoes from Asia) undercut American producers. By the 1980s there was a large-scale shift in employment with fewer workers in high-wage sectors and more in the low-wage sectors. Many companies closed or moved factories to Southern states (where unions were weak). The effectiveness of strikes declined sharply, as companies after the 1970s threatened to close down factories or move them to low-wage states or to foreign countries. The number of major work stoppages fell by 97 percent from 381 in 1970 to 187 in 1980 to only 11 in 2010. The accumulating weaknesses were exposed when President Ronald Reagan—a former union president—broke the Professional Air Traffic Controllers Organization (PATCO) strike in 1981, dealing a major blow to unions.

Union membership among workers in private industry shrank dramatically, though after 1970 there was growth in employees unions of federal, state and local governments. The intellectual mood in the 1970s and 1980s favored deregulation and free competition. Numerous industries were deregulated, including airlines, trucking, railroads and telephones, over the objections of the unions involved.

Republicans, using conservative think tanks as idea farms, began to push through legislative blueprints to curb the power of public employee unions as well as eliminate business regulations.

Union weakness in the South undermined unionization and social reform throughout the nation, and such weakness is largely responsible for the anaemic US welfare state.

=== AFL and CIO merger 1955 ===
The friendly merger of the AFL and CIO marked an end not only to the acrimony and jurisdictional conflicts between the coalitions, it also signaled the end of the era of experimentation and expansion that began in the mid-1930s. Merger became politically possible because of the deaths of Green of the AFL and Murray of the CIO in late 1952, replaced by George Meany and Reuther. The CIO was no longer the radical dynamo, and was no longer a threat in terms of membership for the AFL had twice as many members.

Furthermore, the AFL was doing a better job of expanding into the fast-growing white collar sector, with its organizations of clerks, public employees, teachers, and service workers. Although the AFL building trades maintained all-white policies, the AFL had more black members in all as the CIO. The problem of union corruption was growing in public awareness, and CIO's industrial unions were less vulnerable to penetration by criminal elements than were the AFL's trucking, longshoring, building, and entertainment unions. But Meany had a strong record in fighting corruption in New York unions, and was highly critical of the notoriously corrupt Teamsters.

Unification would help the central organization fight corruption, yet would not contaminate the CIO unions. The defeat of the New Deal in the 1952 election further emphasized the need for unity to maximize political effectiveness. From the CIO side the merger was promoted by David McDonald of the Steelworkers and his top aide Arthur J. Goldberg. To achieve the successful merger, they jettisoned the more liberal policies of the CIO regarding civil rights and membership rights for blacks, jurisdictional disputes, and industrial unionism. Reuther went along with the compromises and did not contest the selection of Meany to head the AFL-CIO.

Fearing the fallout of a drawn-out negotiation process, the AFL and CIO leadership decided on a "short route" to reconciliation. This meant all AFL and CIO unions would be accepted into the new organization "as is," with all conflicts and overlaps to be sorted out after the merger. Negotiations were conducted by a small, select group of advisors. The draft constitution was primarily written by AFL Vice President Matthew Woll and CIO General Counsel Arthur Goldberg, while the joint policy statements were written by Woll, CIO Secretary-Treasurer James Carey, CIO vice presidents David McDonald and Joseph Curran, Brotherhood of Railway Clerks President George Harrison, and Illinois AFL-CIO President Reuben Soderstrom.

=== Conservative attacks ===
Labor unions were a whole high-profile target of Republican activists throughout the 1940s and 1950s, especially the Taft-Hartley Act of 1947. Both the business community and local Republicans wanted to weaken unions, which played a major role in funding and campaigning for Democratic candidates. The strategy of the Eisenhower administration was to consolidate the anti-union potential inherent in Taft-Hartley. Pressure from the Justice Department, the Labor Department, and especially from congressional investigations focused on criminal activity and racketeering in high-profile labor unions, especially the Teamsters Union. Republicans wanted to delegitimize unions by focusing on their shady activities. The McClellan Committee hearings targeted Teamsters president James R. Hoffa as a public enemy. Young Robert F. Kennedy played a major role working for the committee. Public opinion polls showed growing distrust toward unions, and especially union leaders — or "labor bosses," as Republicans called them. The bipartisan Conservative Coalition, with the aid of liberals such as the Kennedy brothers, won new Congressional restrictions on organized labor in the form of the Landrum-Griffin Act (1959). The main impact was to force more democracy on the previously authoritarian union hierarchies. However, in the 1958 elections, taking place during a sharp economic recession, the unions fought back especially against state Right to Work laws and defeated many conservative Republicans.

The Teamsters union was expelled from the AFL for its notorious corruption under president Dave Beck. Its troubles gained national attention from highly visible Senate hearings. The target was Jimmy Hoffa (1913–1975), who replaced Beck and held total power until he was imprisoned in 1964.

=== 1960s: Liberal achievement in Civil Rights and backlash ===
The UAW under Reuther played a major role in funding and supporting the Civil Rights Movement in the 1950s and 1960s. More traditional unions favored their white members and encountered federal court intervention.

After the smashing reelection victory of President Lyndon B. Johnson in 1964, the heavily Democratic Congress passed a raft of liberal legislation. Labor union leaders claimed credit for the widest range of liberal laws since the New Deal era, including the Civil Rights Act of 1964; the Voting Rights Act of 1965; the War on Poverty; aid to cities and education; increased Social Security benefits; and Medicare for the elderly. The 1966 elections were an unexpected disaster, with defeats for many of the more liberal Democrats. According to Alan Draper, the AFL-CIO Committee on Political Action (COPE) was the main electioneering unit of the labor movement. It ignored the white backlash against civil rights, which had become a main Republican attack point. The COPE assumed falsely that union members were interested in issues of greatest salience to union leadership, but polls showed this was not true. The members were much more conservative. The younger ones were much more concerned about taxes and crime, and the older ones had not overcome racial biases. Furthermore, a new issue—the War in Vietnam—was bitterly splitting the New Deal coalition into hawks (led by Johnson and Vice-president Hubert Humphrey) and doves (led by Senators Eugene McCarthy and Robert Kennedy).

=== Hispanics ===
==== Chavez and the United Farm Workers ====
Hispanics form a large fraction of the farm labor force, but due to the fact that agricultural workers were not protected under the National Labor Relations Act (NLRA) of 1935, there was little successful unionization before the arrival in the 1960s of Cesar Chavez (1927–1993) and Dolores Huerta (1930), who mobilized California workers into the United Farm Workers (UFW) organization.

Chavez's use of non-violent methods combined with Huerta's organizational skills allowed for many of the bigger successes of the organization.

A key success for the UFW was in partnering with the Agricultural Workers Organizing Committee (AWOC), which primarily worked with Filipino farm workers, and creating the eventual United Farmworkers Union in 1972. Together, they organized a worker strike and consumer boycott of the grape growers in California that lasted for over five years. Through collaboration with consumers and student protesters, the UFW was able to secure a three-year contract with the state's top grape growers to increase the safety and pay of farm workers.

Chavez had a significant political impact; as Jenkins points out, "state and national elites no longer automatically sided with the growers." Thus, the political insurgency of the UFW was successful because of effective strategizing in the right kind of political environment. In the decades following its early success, the UFW experienced a steep decline in membership due to purges of key organizational leaders by Chavez. With Chavez unable to lead effectively, the Teamsters Union moved in and replaced the UFW. In 2015 José-Antonio Orosco pointed out that the UFW, "devolved from a powerful labor union for farmworkers to a fragile organization that today draws most of its support from mailed donations and represents fewer than five thousand workers in an industry that employs tens of thousands." In her biography of Chavez, Miriam Powell blames one person for the collapse: Chavez himself.

==== Hotels ====
Nationwide unions have been seeking opportunities to enroll Hispanic members. Much of their limited success has been in the hotel industry, especially in Nevada.

=== Reagan era, 1980s ===
Dana Cloud argues, "the emblematic moment of the period from 1955 through the 1980s in American labor was the tragic PATCO strike in 1981." Most unions were strongly opposed to Reagan in the 1980 presidential election, despite the fact that Reagan remains the only union leader (or even member) to become president. On August 3, 1981, the Professional Air Traffic Controllers Organization (PATCO) union — which had supported Reagan — rejected the government's pay raise offer and sent its 16,000 members out on strike to shut down the nation's commercial airlines. They demanded a reduction in the workweek to 32 from 40 hours, a $10,000 bonus, pay raises up to 40 percent, and early retirement.

Federal law forbade such a strike, and the United States Department of Transportation implemented a backup plan (of supervisors and military air controllers) to keep the system running. The strikers were given 48 hours to return to work, else they would be fired and banned from ever again working in a federal capacity. A fourth of the strikers came back to work, but 13,000 did not. The strike collapsed, PATCO vanished, and the union movement as a whole suffered a major reversal, which accelerated the decline of membership across the board in the private sector.

Schulman and Zelizer argue that the breaking of PATCO, "sent shock waves through the entire U.S. labor relations regime. ... strike rates plummeted, and union power sharply declined." Unions suffered a continual decline of power during the Reagan administration, with a concomitant effect on wages. The average first-year raise (for 1000-plus–worker contracts) fell from 9.8 percent to 1.2 percent; in manufacturing, raises fell from 7.2 percent to negative 1.2 percent. Salaries of unionized workers also fell relative to non-union workers. Women and Black people suffered more from these trends.

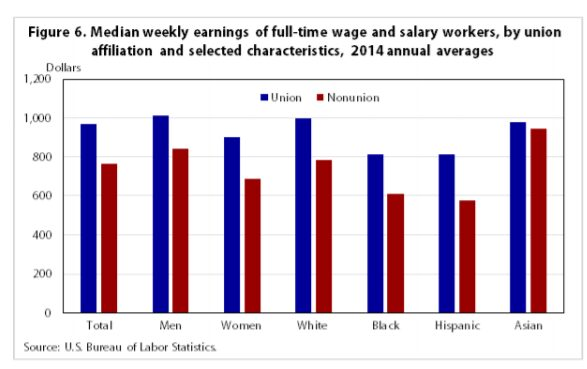
Union cash advantage 2014

=== Decline of private sector unions ===
By 2011 fewer than seven percent of employees in the private sector belonged to unions. The UAW's numbers of automobile union members are representative of the manufacturing sector: 1,619,000 active members in 1970, 1,446,000 in 1980, 952,000 in 1990, 623,000 in 2004, and 377,000 in 2010 (with far more retired than active members).

By 2014, coal mining in the United States had largely shifted to open-pit mines in Wyoming, and there were only 60,000 active coal miners. The UMW has 35,000 members, of whom 20,000 were coal miners, chiefly in underground mines in Kentucky and West Virginia. By contrast it had 800,000 members in the late 1930s. However it remains responsible for pensions and medical benefits for 40,000 retired miners, and for 50,000 spouses and dependents.

== Rise in union activity (2016–present) ==
The number of union members nationwide increased from 2016 to 2017, and some states saw union growth for the first time in several years or decades. Nearly half a million workers went on strike in 2018 and 2019, the largest numbers in three decades. Union growth in 2017 was primarily millennial workers. For instance, about 76 percent of new UAW union members during their increase came from workers under the age of 35. Although the total number of union members increased 1.7 percent in 2017, the Economic Policy Institute noted that year-to-year union membership often fluctuates due to hiring or layoffs in particular sectors, and cautioned against interpreting one-year changes as trends. The percentage of the workforce belonging to unions was 10.7 percent in 2017, unchanged over the previous year, but down from 11.1 percent in 2015, and 12.1 percent in 2007.

In recent years, efforts have also been made to extend the protections of the National Labor Relations Act of 1935, which excluded domestic workers and farm workers, to those groups on the state level. The National Domestic Workers' Alliance has successfully advocated for a Domestic Workers' Bill of Rights in New York, California, and Hawaii, while several states have passed legislation expanding the rights of farm workers.

On July 15, 2022, the National Labor Relations Board (NLRB) reported that the amount of union representation petitions filed with the board increased by 58% in the first three quarters of the 2022 fiscal year. This was more than the total amount of petitions filed in the entire 2021 fiscal year.

=== Teacher strikes ===
In 2018, a series of statewide teacher strikes and protests happened garnering nationwide attention due to their success, as well as the fact that several of them were in states where public-employee strikes are illegal. Many of the major strikes were in Republican majority state legislatures, leading to the name "Red State Revolt". Protests were held in Arizona, Colorado, North Carolina, Oklahoma, and West Virginia. Additional smaller protests were held in Kentucky and North Carolina. The protests spread to a bus driver strike in the suburbs of Atlanta, Georgia, where nearly 250 bus drivers participated. The strikes included an adjunct faculty strike at Virginia Commonwealth University in Richmond, Virginia, leading to an increase in adjunct wages.

=== Unionization in the high tech sector ===
The relatively new high tech sector, typically dealing with the creation, design, development, and engineering of computer hardware and software products, has typically not been unionized as it is considered white-collar jobs, often with high pay rates and benefits. There has been worker activism to try to get the employer to change their practices related to labor, such as a November 2018 walkout at Google by 20,000 employees to make the company change its policy on sexual harassment. However, these efforts have traditionally stopped short of the need for unionization, and achieving the scale of employee involvement to bring a union to their workplace can be difficult due to the numerous benefits these employees may already have and the blue-collar nature that union association may bring.

One area where unionization efforts have become more intense is in the video game industry. Numerous publicized events since 2004 have revealed the excessive use of "crunch time" at some companies; where there is a reasonable expectation in the industry that employees may be needed to put in more time near the release of a game product, some companies were noted for using a "crunch time" approach through much longer periods or as a constant expectation of their employees; further, most of those employed in the video game market are exempt from overtime, compounding the issue. Major grassroots efforts through the game industry since 2018 have promoted the creation of a new union or working with an existing union to cover the industry. One of the first high tech companies to establish a union was Kickstarter, whose employees voted in favor of unionizing in February 2020.

On April 1, 2022, Amazon workers at the JFK8 warehouse in Staten Island, New York City voted in favor of a union, becoming Amazon's first unionized workplace in the United States.

=== Hollywood labor disputes, 2023 ===
From May 2 to November 9, 2023, a series of long labor disputes within the film and television industries of the United States took place, mainly focused on the strikes of the Writers Guild of America and SAG-AFTRA.

=== Unionization in the food service and grocery industries ===
The food service industry has one of the lowest unionization rates in the United States, with just 1.2% of workers belonging to a union in 2020 and 2021.

==== Starbucks ====
In late 2021, a Starbucks store located in Buffalo, New York, became Starbucks' only unionized location among 9,000 stores in the United States, joining Workers United of the Service Employees International Union. A second location in Buffalo followed, winning an election certified by the NLRB in January 2022. During this time, the number of stores filing petitions to the NLRB grew to over ten locations, seven of them being outside of the Buffalo area.

The number of Starbucks stores that have decided to vote on unionization has since grown significantly. As of August 2022, 209 Starbucks locations have voted for unionization, with another 45 locations voting against unionization.

==== Trader Joe's ====
In late July 2022, workers at a Trader Joe's in Hadley, Massachusetts, voted to become the first unionized location in the grocery store chain. Workers at this location chose to create an independent union called Trader Joe's United, and received administrative and legal support from already existing unions, but decided not to become a part of any larger established union. Two locations, one in Boulder, Colorado, and one in Minneapolis, also filed for unionization around this time. On August 12, 2022, the Minneapolis location went on to become the second store to unionize, joining Trader Joe's United. Comparisons to the unionization efforts of Starbucks locations were made following the success of the Minneapolis vote, with workers of the two respective unions both publicly supporting one another.

As of September 23, 2022, workers in Brooklyn, New York, have petitioned for unionization with the NLRB, and would potentially become the third unionized location out of over 500 Trader Joe's stores.

==== Chipotle ====
In late June 2022, a Chipotle Mexican Grill restaurant in Augusta, Maine, became the chain's first location to petition for a union election, looking to organize independently as Chipotle United, citing issues regarding understaffing as well as crew and food safety. In that same month, Chipotle decided to permanently close the location, leading to workers filing a complaint with the NLRB and accusing Chipotle of union-busting. Chipotle has denied such claims, and have stated that the company was unable to provide enough staffing for the location.

In late August 2022, workers at a Chipotle in Lansing, Michigan, voted to unionize, becoming the fast food chain's first union in the United States. Workers at this location voted 11 to three, opting to unionize with the International Brotherhood of Teamsters.

== Public-sector unions ==
Labor unions generally ignored government employees because they were controlled mostly by the patronage system used by the political parties before the arrival of civil service. Post Office workers did form unions. The National Association of Letter Carriers started in 1889 and grew quickly. By the mid-1960s it had 175,000 members in 6,400 local branches.

Several competing organizations of postal clerks emerged starting in the 1890s. Merger discussions dragged on for years, until finally the NFPOC, UNMAPOC and others merged in 1961 as the United Federation of Postal Clerks. Another round of mergers in 1971 produced the American Postal Workers Union (APWU). In 2012 the APWU had 330,000 members. The various postal unions did not engage in strikes.

Historian Joseph Slater, says, "Unfortunately for public sector unions, the most searing and enduring image of their history in the first half of the twentieth century was the Boston police strike. The strike was routinely cited by courts and officials through the end of the 1940s." Governor Calvin Coolidge broke the strike and the legislature took control of the police away from city officials.

The police strike chilled union interest in the public sector in the 1920s. The major exception was the emergence of unions of public school teachers in the largest cities; they formed the American Federation of Teachers (AFT), affiliated with the AFL. In suburbs and small cities, the National Education Association (NEA) became active, but it insisted it was not a labor union but a professional organization.

=== New Deal era ===
In the mid-1930s efforts were made to unionize Works Progress Administration workers, but were opposed by President Franklin D. Roosevelt. Moe points out that Roosevelt, "an ardent supporter of collective bargaining in the private sector, was opposed to it in the public sector." Roosevelt in 1937 told the nation what the position of his government was: "All Government employees should realize that the process of collective bargaining, as usually understood, cannot be transplanted into the public service.... The very nature and purposes of government make it impossible for administrative officials to represent fully or to bind the employer in mutual discussions with government employee organizations.

=== "Little New Deal" era ===
Change came in the 1950s. In 1958 New York mayor Robert Wagner, Jr. issued an executive order, called "the little Wagner Act," giving city employees certain bargaining rights, and gave their unions with exclusive representation (that is, the unions alone were legally authorized to speak for all city workers, regardless of whether or not some workers were members.) Management complained but the unions had power in city politics.

By the 1960s and 1970s public-sector unions expanded rapidly to cover teachers, clerks, firemen, police, prison guards and others. In 1962, President John F. Kennedy issued Executive Order 10988, upgrading the status of unions of federal workers.

=== Recent years ===
After 1960, public sector unions grew rapidly and secured good wages and high pensions for their members. While manufacturing and farming steadily declined, state- and local-government employment quadrupled from 4 million workers in 1950 to 12 million in 1976 and 16.6 million in 2009.

In 2009, the US membership of public sector unions surpassed membership of private sector unions for the first time, at 7.9 million and 7.4 million respectively.

In 2011, states faced a growing fiscal crisis and the Republicans had made major gains in the 2010 elections. Public sector unions came under heavy attack especially in Wisconsin, as well as Indiana, New Jersey and Ohio from conservative Republican legislatures. Conservative state legislatures tried to drastically reduce the abilities of unions to collectively bargain. Conservatives argued that public unions were too powerful since they helped elect their bosses, and that overly generous pension systems were too heavy a drain on state budgets.

A 2023 study published by Oxfam found that the United States ranks among the worst among developed countries for labor protections, including the right to organize, ranking 32 out of 38 among OECD countries.

In March 2025 President Donald Trump signed an executive order that instructed many federal agencies to end collective bargaining with many federal unions. The Trump administration also launched a lawsuit against the American Federation of Government Employees seeking to invalidate existing federal collective bargaining agreements between federal agencies and federal unions arguing it constrains the executive branch.

== Analysis ==
Number of striking workers by year, Bureau of Labor Statistics

According to labor historians, the US has the most violent labor history of any industrialized nation.

Some historians have attempted to explain why a labor party did not emerge in the United States, in contrast to Western Europe. Historian Gary Gerstle asserts that organized labor in the US was strongest when the fear of communism reached its peak, and the former's decline coincided with the collapse of the latter. Gerstle argues that capitalist elites were much less willing to compromise with the working class once the threat of communism disappeared and neoliberal capitalism became the dominant global system. He emphasizes that this analysis is not meant to rehabilitate communist governments, which he describes as tyrannies. Elizabeth S. Anderson posits that with the end of the Cold War and the victory of "ostensibly" free markets, there was a sharp decline of organized labor in the United States along with a collapse in academic and public discourse about the pervasiveness of "authoritarian private governments" in the form of large, hierarchal corporations birthed during the Industrial Revolution, which was something that "organized workers of the nineteenth century saw clearly."

Labor historian Julie Greene writes that the Second Gilded Age has seen the entrenchment of corporate power and the dismantling of labor movements, which has resulted in falling real wages and increased working class acquiescence to exploitation. She argues that this is a key difference from the original Gilded Age when there was violent capital-labor conflict as working class people created powerful labor movements to improve wages and working conditions, which helped pave the way to what she describes as a "gentler capitalism" in the mid 20th century. According to Greene, the disappearance of any alternatives to capitalism globally, in particular the dissolution of the Soviet Union and China's economic liberalization, has made the process of expanding corporate power and dismantling labor movements easier.

== Labor Statistics ==
The Bureau of Labor Statistics, and the predecessor organizations it cites, have kept track of the number of striking workers per year since 1881.

For data from 1881 to 1905 the Commissioner of Labor, then within the Department of Interior conducted four periodic surveys (Note: In 1887, 1894, 1901 & 1906) covering that period. The data is considered likely un-comprehensive but still used the same definition of strikes as later periods. For this era, all strikes with more than six workers or less than one day were excluded. No concrete data was collected for the amount of strikes from 1906 to 1913 federally. Data from 1915 to 1926 is more comprehensive. In 1915, the Bureau of Labor Statistics had formed a more systemized set of data collection. Data on the number of workers involved remained a rough estimate but more consistent. The data however also included strikes with fewer than six workers involved, likely leading to slightly higher worker estimates.

Data from 1927 to 1981 is more detailed then the previous periods. In 1927, monthly and yearly strike reports by the department were implemented. Any strikes with fewer than six workers or lasting less than a day were excluded from data leading to marginally smaller estimates then the previous period. For strike numbers this change could pose issues, however for total worker estimates it is considered to only have small effects. Within this period, with the passing of the Taft-Hartley Act in 1947, the program was revamped under the work stoppage program, however the criteria remained largely identical.

Data from 1981 (Note: Historical data for 1981 is unavailable, so has been replaced with the adjusted data for strikes with at least a 1,000 workers.) to present remains an underestimate of workers striking each year in comparison to all other periods. In February 1982, the BLS had to stop counting strikes with fewer than 1,000 workers, as budget cuts to its Division of Industrial Relations made it infeasible to count them any more.

Year	Number of workers on strike by year	Strikes
1881	130,176	1881 Atlanta washerwomen strike
1882	158,802	
1883	170,275	Camp Dump strike
1884	165,175	
1885	258,129	1885 Yonkers carpet weavers strike
1886	610,024	Great Southwest railroad strike of 1886; Bay View massacre; Haymarket affair
1887	439,306	Thibodaux massacre (Sugar cane workers' strike)
1888	162,880	
1889	260,290	
1890	373,499	
1891	329,953	Cotton pickers' strike of 1891; Coal Creek War
1892	238,685	Homestead strike; Coeur d'Alene labor strike; Buffalo switchmen's strike
1893	287,756	
1894	690,044	Pullman Strike; Bituminous coal miners' strike of 1894; Great Northern Railway strike; Cripple Creek miners' strike of 1894
1895	407,188	
1896	248,838	Leadville miners' strike
1897	416,154	Lattimer massacre
1898	263,219	
1899	431,889	Weight Strike; Coeur d'Alene labor confrontation; Newsboys' strike
1900	567,719	1900 Anthracite coal strike; St. Louis streetcar strike of 1900
1901	563,843	U.S. Steel recognition strike of 1901
1902	691,507	Anthracite coal strike of 1902
1903	787,834	Oxnard strike of 1903; Carbon County Strike; Pacific Electric Railway strike of 1903
1904	573,815	
1905	302,434	1905 Chicago teamsters' strike
1906	Not measured	United Railroads Strike of 1906 by IBEW1245 in San Francisco; 1906 GE sit-down strike (Schenectady, NY)
1907	Not measured	1907 San Francisco streetcar strike; Boston garment worker strike; 1907 Skowhegan textile strike
1908	Not measured	Pensacola streetcar strike of 1908
1909	Not measured	New York shirtwaist strike of 1909; Pressed Steel Car strike of 1909; Georgia Railroad strike
1910	Not measured	Clockmakers' strike; 1910 Chicago garment workers' strike; Westmoreland County coal strike of 1910–1911; Tampa cigar makers' strike of 1910–11; 1910 Columbus streetcar strike; Philadelphia general strike (1910)
1911	Not measured	Illinois Central shopmen's strike of 1911; 1911 Grand Rapids furniture workers strike; Louisiana-Texas Lumber War of 1911–1912
1912	Not measured	1912 Lawrence "Bread & Roses" textile strike; 1912 New York City waiters' strike; Paint Creek–Cabin Creek strike of 1912; Seattle Fishermen halibut strike of 1912; Chicago Newspaper strike of 1912; 1912–1913 Little Falls textile strike
1913	Not measured	Colorado Coalfield War; 1913 Paterson silk strike; El Paso smelters' strike; Indianapolis streetcar strike; Copper Country strike of 1913–1914
1914	Unavailable	1914–1915 Fulton Bag and Cotton Mills strike
1915	Unavailable	Bayonne refinery strikes
1916	1,559,917	1916 Atlanta streetcar strike; 1916–1917 northern Minnesota lumber strike
1917	1,227,254	1917 Twin Cities streetcar strike; 1917 Bloomington Streetcar Strike
1918	1,239,989	
1919	4,160,348	1919 Actors' Equity Association strike; 1919 New York City Harbor Strike; Boston cigar makers' strike of 1919; Los Angeles streetcar strike of 1919; Steel strike of 1919; UMW Coal Strike of 1919; 1919 New England Textile Strike; 1919 New York Longshoremen strike
1920	1,463,054	1920 Alabama coal strike; Denver streetcar strike
1921	1,099,247	
1922	1,612,562	Great Railroad Strike of 1922; UMW General coal strike (1922); 1922 New England Textile Strike; Portland Waterfront strike, 1922
1923	756,584	1923 San Pedro maritime strike
1924	654,641	
1925	428,416	
1926	329,592	1926 Passaic textile strike
1927	329,939	1927 Indiana bituminous strike; 1927–1928 Colorado Coal Strike
1928	314,210	1928 New Bedford textile strike; Cantaloupe strike of 1928
1929	288,572	Loray Mill strike; 1929 New Orleans streetcar strike
1930	182,975	Imperial Valley lettuce strike
1931	341,817	Santa Clara cannery strike; Ybor City cigar makers' strike of 1931
1932	324,210	Century Airlines pilots' strike; Vacaville tree pruners' strike
1933	1,168,272	1933 Detroit auto strike; California agricultural strikes of 1933; 1933 Wisconsin milk strike; 1933 Yakima Valley strike; El Monte berry strike of 1933; Los Angeles Garment Workers strike of 1933; Santa Clara cherry strike of 1933
1934	1,466,695	Textile workers' strike (1934); 1934 West Coast waterfront strike; Auto-Lite strike; Minneapolis general strike; 1934 New York Hotel Strike; 1934–35 Milwaukee sales clerks' strike; 1934 Kohler strike; Hardin County onion pickers strike; New York Shipbuilding strike; Salinas Lettuce strike of 1934
1935	1,117,213	Pacific Northwest lumber strike; 1935 Gulf Coast longshoremen's strike
1936	788,648	Flint sit-down strike; SS California strike; Gulf Coast maritime workers' strike; Remington Rand strike of 1936–1937; 1936 Seattle Post-Intelligencer strike; Citrus Strike of 1936
1937	1,860,62	Little Steel strike; Lewiston–Auburn shoe strike; Fleischer Studios strike; 1937 New York City department store strikes; Pennsylvania chocolate workers' strike, 1937; Stockton cannery strike of 1937
1938	688,000	1938 San Antonio pecan shellers strike; 1938 New York City truckers strike
1939	1,171,000	Tool and die strike of 1939; Chrysler Auto Strike
1940	576,988	
1941	2,362,620	Disney animators' strike
1942	840,000	1942-43 musicians' strike
1943	1,981,279	
1944	2,116,000	Philadelphia Transit Strike; Port Chicago mutiny
1945	3,467,000	United Auto Workers strike of 1945–1946; Hollywood Black Friday
1946	4,600,000	1946 Steel Strike; 1946 UMW Mine Strike; 1946 Rail Strike; 1946 United Electrical GE strike; 1945–1946 Charleston Cigar Factory strike
1947	2,170,000	Telephone Strike
1948	1,960,000	1948 US Meatpacking strike; 1948 Caterpillar strike; Boeing Strike of 1948; Goodyear strike; 1948 Miami Garment workers strike
1949	3,030,000	1949 New York City brewery strike; Puget Sound fishermen's strike of 1949; 1949 Calvary Cemetery strike
1950	2,410,000	Atlanta transit strike of 1950
1951	2,220,000	1951 Caterpillar strike; 1951 Aliquippa steelworkers strike
1952	3,540,000	1952 steel strike
1953	2,400,000	1953 Milwaukee brewery strike
1954	1,530,000	
1955	2,650,000	
1956	1,900,000	
1957	1,390,000	1957 Western Electric strike; 1957 Long Island strike
1958	2,060,000	
1959	1,880,000	Steel strike of 1959; 1959 United Mine Workers strike
1960	1,320,000	1960 Writers Guild of America strike
1961	1,450,000	
1962	1,230,000	1962 New York City newspaper strike
1963	941,000	
1964	1,640,000	1964–1965 Scripto strike
1965	1,550,000	
1966	1,960,000	1966 New York City transit strike; Texas farm workers' strike; St. John's University strike of 1966–67
1967	2,870,000	1967 US Railroad strike; 1967 US truckers strike; November 1967 General Motors strike; 1967 Caterpillar strike; September 1967 General Motors strike
1968	2,649,000	New York City Teacher's Strike of 1968; Florida statewide teachers' strike of 1968; Chrysler wildcat strike; Memphis sanitation strike; St. Petersburg, FL sanitation strike; 1968 NFL strike/lockout
1969	2,481,000	
1970	3,305,000	1970 General Motors Strike; U.S. Postal Service strike of 1970; Salad Bowl strike; 1970 Southern California construction strike; 1970 US truckers strike
1971	3,279,600	1971 Longshore strike; 1971 Rail strike; 1971 Telephone strike; 1971 Bituminous coal strike; 1971 Northern and Central California construction strikes; 1971 International Harvester strike
1972	1,713,600	
1973	2,250,700	1973 Chrysler strike; 1973 Pennsylvania Central Transportation strike; 1973 Caterpillar strike; 1973 Chicago teachers strike; 1973 Philadelphia teachers strike; 1973 Detroit teachers strike; 1973 Cleveland teachers strike
1974	2,777,700	Bituminous Coal Strike of 1974; 1974 NFL strike
1975	1,745,600	
1976	2,420,000	
1977	2,040,100	1977 Atlanta sanitation strike; Bituminous Coal Strike of 1977–1978; 1977–78 Coors strike
1978	1,779,800	1978 New York City newspaper strike
1979	1,727,100	1979 Boston University strike
1980	1,366,000	1980 actors strike
1981	728,900	Air traffic controllers' strike; 1981 Writers Guild of America strike; 1981 Schlitz strike; 1981 Major League Baseball strike
1982	655,800	1982 garment workers' strike; 1982 animators' strike; 1982 NFL strike
1983	909,400	1983 AT&T strike; 1983 Arizona copper mine strike; 1983 Greyhound Bus Lines strike in Seattle
1984	376,000	
1985	323,900	1985 Pan Am strike; 1985 Major League Baseball strike; 1985–1986 Hormel strike; 1985–1986 New Bedford fishermen's strike; 1985–1987 Watsonville Cannery strike
1986	533,100	Guilford Transportation Industries railroad workers' strike; Major Indoor Soccer League lockout
1987	174,400	International Paper strike; 1987 NFL strike
1988	118,300	1988 Writers Guild of America strike; 1989 200,000 New England Telephone Company 17 weeks
1989	452,100	Pittston Coal strike
1990	184,900	1990 Major League Baseball lockout
1991	392,000	
1992	363,800	Southern California drywall strike; 1992 CSX railroad strike; 1992 NHL strike
1993	181,900	
1994	322,200	1994 US truckers strike; 1994 Caterpillar strike; San Francisco newspaper strike of 1994; 1994–95 NHL lockout; 1994–95 Major League Baseball strike
1995	191,500	1995 Boeing Strike; 1995 NBA lockout; Detroit newspaper strike of 1995–1997
1996	272,700	1996 General Motors Strike; 1996 NBA lockout
1997	338,600	1997 UPS Strike
1998	386,800	1998 General Motors strike; 1998 Bell Atlantic strike; 1998–99 NBA lockout
1998	72,600	
2000	393,700	2000 commercial actors strike; Verizon strike of 2000; 2000 L.A. County Workers Strike
2001	99,100	
2002	45,900	
2003	129,200	2003 Broadway musicians strike; Southern California supermarket strike of 2003–2004; 2003 Hospitality Congress Plaza Hotel strike
2004	170,700	2004 SBC Communications workers strike; 2004–05 NHL lockout
2005	99,600	2005 New York City transit strike
2006	70,100	University of Miami Justice for Janitors campaign
2007	189,200	2007 General Motors strike; 2007–2008 Writers Guild of America strike; 2007–2008 CBS News writers strike; 2007 Orange County transit strike; 2007 Freightliner wildcat strike; 2007 Broadway Stagehand Strike; Hayward teachers strike
2008	72,200	Boeing Machinists Strike of 2008
2009	12,500	
2010	44,500	2010 Georgia prison strike; 2010 Major League Soccer lockout/strike
2011	112,500	2011 Verizon Strike; 2011 NBA lockout; 2011 NFL lockout
2012	148,100	2012 Ports of Los Angeles and Long Beach strike; 2012 NFL referee lockout; 2012–13 NHL lockout
2013	54,500	
2014	34,300	Tacoma nurses strike 2014
2015	47,300	2015 United Steel Workers Oil Refinery strike; 2015 Kohler strike
2016	99,400	2016 Verizon workers' strike; 2016–2017 video game voice actor strike
2017	25,300	
2018	485,200	2018 University of California Medical Centers Strike; Marriott Hotels strike; 2018 DeKalb County School District bus drivers' strike; 2018 Alabama Coca-Cola strike; 2018 Atlanta sanitation strike; 2018 Taylorsville Georgia-Pacific strike; 2018–2019 education workers' strikes in the United States
2019	425,500	2019 General Electric strike; 2019 Stop & Shop strike; 2019 Los Angeles Unified School District teachers' strike; 2019 AT&T strike; Wright State University 2019 faculty strike; 2019 Alaska ferry workers' strike
2020	27,000	2020 Bath shipbuilders strike; 2020 Michigan graduate students strike; 2020 University of Illinois Hospital strikes; 2020 Santa Cruz graduate students' strike; 2020 New Orleans sanitation strike; 2020–2021 Alabama aluminum plant strike
2021	80,700	2021 Washington state carpenters strike; 2021 John Deere strike; 2021 Columbia University strike; 2021 Virginia Volvo Trucks strike; 2021 New York University strike; 2021 Mercy Hospital strike; 2021 Kellogg's strike; 2021 Hunts Point Produce Market strike; 2021 Allegheny Technologies strike; 2021 Nabisco strike; 2021 Cook County nurses strike; 2021 Saint Vincent Hospital strike; 2021 Frito-Lay strike; 2021 Heaven Hill strike; 2021 St. Paul Park refinery strike; 2021 St. Charles Bend strike; 2021 Oregon Tech strike; 2021 Kaiser Permanente strike; 2021–2023 Warrior Met Coal strike
2022	120,600	2022 University of California academic workers' strike; 2022 Minneapolis teacher's strike; 2022–2023 HarperCollins strike
2023	477,900	2023 Writers Guild of America strike; 2023 SAG-AFTRA strike; 2023 Rutgers University strike; 2023 Starbucks strike; 2023 Los Angeles city workers strike; 2023 Los Angeles hotel strike; 2023 United Auto Workers strike; 2023 Kaiser Permanente healthcare workers strike
2025		2025 Starbucks workers' strike

== See also ==
- American Federation of Labor (AFL), now AFL–CIO
- Anti-union violence in the United States
- Congress of Industrial Organizations, 1935 to 1955, now AFL–CIO
- Communists in the United States labor movement (1937–1950)
- Gilded Age
- History of labor law in the United States
- History of unfree labor in the United States
- Immigration policies of American labor unions
- International comparisons of labor unions
- Labor federation competition in the United States
- Labor unions in the United States
- List of strikes (many in the United States)
- List of US strikes by size
- List of US strikes by size
- List of worker deaths in United States labor disputes
- Minimum wage in the United States
- New Deal coalition
- Poverty in the United States
  - History of poverty in the United States
- Union violence in the United States
- United States labor law
- US Strike wave of 1919
- US Strike wave of 1945–1946

== Bibliography ==
=== Surveys ===
- Arnesen, Eric, ed. Encyclopedia of U.S. Labor and Working-Class History (2006), 2064pp; 650 articles by experts; excerpt and text search
- Beik, Millie, ed. Labor Relations: Major Issues in American History (2005) over 100 annotated primary documents; excerpt and text search
- Boone, Graham. "Labor law highlights, 1915–2015." Monthly Labor Review (2015). online
- Boris, Eileen, Nelson Lichtenstein, and Thomas Paterson, eds. Major Problems in the History of American Workers: Documents and Essays (2002); primary and secondary sources.
- Brenner, Aaron Brenner et al. eds. The Encyclopedia of Strikes in American History (ME Sharpe, 2009) 789 pp.
- Brody, David. In Labor's Cause: Main Themes on the History of the American Worker (1993); excerpt and text search
- Commons, John R. and Associates. History of Labour In The United States. [1896–1932] (4 vol. 1921–1957), highly detailed classic to 1920. online
- Derks, Scott. Working Americans, 1880-1999: The Working Class (2000)
- Dubofsky, Melvyn. Industrialism and the American worker, 1865-1920 (1975); online
- Dubofsky, Melvyn. Labor Leaders in America (1987).
- Dubofsky, Melvyn, and Foster Rhea Dulles. Labor in America: A History (8th ed. 2010); wide-ranging survey
- Dubofsky, Melvyn, ed. American labor since the New Deal (1971); online
- Faue, Elizabeth. Rethinking the American Labor Movement (2017); excerpt
- Fink, Gary M., ed. Labor Unions (Greenwood Press, 1977) online
- Fink, Gary M., ed. Biographical Dictionary of American Labor (Greenwood Press, 1984).
- Kessler-Harris, Alice. Out to work: A history of wage-earning women in the United States (Oxford UP, 1982, 2003); online.
- Loomis, Erik (2020). A History of America in Ten Strikes. The New Press. ISBN 978-1620976272.
- Minchin, Timothy J. Labor under Fire: A History of the AFL-CIO since 1979 (UNC Press, 2017).
- Lichtenstein, Nelson (2003). State of the Union: A Century of American Labor.
- Perlman, Selig. A theory of the labor movement (1928); online
- Taylor, Paul F. The ABC-CLIO Companion To The American Labor Movement (ABC-CLIO, 1993); an encyclopedia
- Zieger, Robert H., and Gilbert J. Gall. American Workers, American Unions: The Twentieth Century (2002).

=== Specialized studies ===
- Archer, Robin (2007). Why Is There No Labor Party in the United States?. Princeton, NJ: Princeton University Press.
- Arnesen, Eric. "'Like Banquo's Ghost, It Will Not Down': The Race Question and the American Railroad Brotherhoods, 1880-1920." American Historical Review 99.5 (1994): 1601–1633. JSTOR 2168390
- Arnold, Andrew B. Fueling the Gilded Age: Railroads, Miners, and Disorder in Pennsylvania Coal Country (2014) Excerpt and text search
- Blanc, Eric (2025). We Are the Union: How Worker-to-Worker Organizing Is Revitalizing Labor and Winning Big. University of California Press. ISBN 978-0520394919.
- Brecher, Jeremy (2020). Strike!. PM Press. ISBN 978-1629638003.
- Brenner, Aaron et al. The Encyclopedia of Strikes in American History (2009).
- Brody, David. Steelworkers in America: The nonunion era (U of Illinois Press, 1960).
- Brody, David. Workers in Industrial America: Essays on the Twentieth Century Struggle.
- Campbell, D'Ann. Women at War with America: Private Lives in a Patriotic Era (Harvard UP, 1984) women workers in World War II.
- DiGirolamo, Vincent. Crying the News: A History of America's Newsboys (2019).
- Dubofsky, Melvyn; Time, Warren Van (1986). John L Lewis. best biography of key 20th century leader
- Foner, Philip (1977). The Great Labor Uprising of 1877. Pathfinder Press. ISBN 978-0873488280.
- Foner, Philip (1980). Women and the American Labor Movement from World War I to the Present.
- Fraser, Steve (1993). Labor Will Rule: Sidney Hillman and the rise of American labor.
- Fraser, Steve (2015). The Age of Acquiescence: The Life and Death of American Resistance to Organized Wealth and Power. Little, Brown and Company. ISBN 0316185434.
- Frymer, Paul (2008). Black and Blue: African Americans, the Labor Movement, and the Decline of the Democratic Party. Princeton University Press. ISBN 978-0691134659.
- Greene, Julie (1998). Pure and Simple Politics: The American Federation of Labor and Political Activism, 1881–1917. Cambridge University Press. ISBN 9780521433983.
- Grossman, Jonathan. "The Coal Strike of 1902 – Turning Point in U.S. Policy" Monthly Labor Review October 1975. online
- Gutman, Herbert G. "Work, culture, and society in industrializing America, 1815-1919." American Historical Review 78.3 (1973): 531-588 JSTOR 1847655.
- Hazard, Blanche E. "The organization of the boot and shoe industry in Massachusetts before 1875." Quarterly Journal of Economics 27.2 (1913): 236–262. JSTOR 1881903
- Hill, Herbert. "The problem of race in American labor history." Reviews in American History 24.2 (1996): 189–208. JSTOR 30030646
- Isaac, Larry W., Rachel G. McKane, and Anna W. Jacobs. "Pitting the Working Class against Itself: Solidarity, Strikebreaking, and Strike Outcomes in the Early US Labor Movement." Social Science History 46.2 (2022): 315–348. online
- Josephson, Matthew. Sidney Hillman: Statesman of American Labor (1952) online.
- Kampelman, Max M. The Communist Party vs The CIO (1957) online
- Kersten, Andrew E. Labor's home front: the American Federation of Labor during World War II (NYU Press, 2006). online
- Laslett, John H M (1970). Labor and the Left; a study of socialist and radical influences in the American labor movement, 1881–1924.
- Lichtenstein, Nelson. Labor's War at Home: The CIO in World War II. (1987)
- Lipold, Paul F., and Larry W. Isaac. "Striking deaths: Lethal contestation and the 'exceptional' character of the American labor movement, 1870–1970." International Review of Social History (2009) 54 (2): 167–205.
- Lipsitz, George. Rainbow at Midnight: Labor and Culture in the 1940s. (U of Illinois Press, 1994).
- Livesay, Harold C (1993). Samuel Gompers and Organized Labor in America.
- McCartin, Joseph A. Collision course: Ronald Reagan, the air traffic controllers, and the strike that changed America (2011) online
- Milkman, Ruth, ed. Women, work, and protest: a century of US women's labor history (Routledge, 2013).
- Mink, Gwendolyn (1986). Old labor and new immigrants in American political development: union, party, and state, 1875–1920. Cornell University Press. ISBN 9780801418631.
- Montgomery, David (1987). The Fall of the House of Labor: The Workplace, the State, and American Labor Activism, 1865–1925.
- Montgomery, David. "Strikes in Nineteenth-Century America," Social Science History (1980) 4#1 pp. 81–104 JSTOR 1170880
- Phelan, Craig. William Green: Biography of a Labor Leader (1989), 20th century AFL leader .
- Reich, Steven A. A Working People: A History of African American Workers since Emancipation (2015)
- Rodgers, Daniel T. The work ethic in industrial America 1850-1920 (U of Chicago Press, 2014).
- Rosenfeld, Jake (2014). What Unions No Longer Do. Harvard University Press. ISBN 0674725115
- Taft, Philip (1957). The AF of L in the Time of Gompers. online
- Taft, Philip (1959). The AF Of L From the Death of Gompers to the Merger. online
- Taillon, Paul Michel. Good, Reliable, White Men: Railroad Brotherhoods, 1877-1917 (U of Illinois Press, 2009).
- Tomlins, Christopher L (1985). The state and the unions: labor relations, law, and the organized labor movement in America, 1880–1960.
- Trotter Jr, Joe William. Workers on arrival: Black labor in the making of America (U of California Press, 2019).
- van der Linden, Marcel. American Labor's Global Ambassadors: The International History of the AFL-CIO during the Cold War (Springer, 2013).
- Vargas, Zaragosa. Proletarians of the North: A history of Mexican industrial workers in Detroit and the Midwest, 1917-1933 (Univ of California Press, 1993).
- Wilentz, Sean. Chants democratic: New York City & the rise of the American working class, 1788-1850 (1984) online
- Zieger, Robert H (1995). The CIO 1935–1955. University of North Carolina Press. ISBN 9780807821824.

=== Historiography ===
- Barrett, James R (2015). "Making and Unmaking the Working Class: E.P. Thompson and the 'New Labor History' in the United States". Historical Reflections. 41 (1).
- Faue, Elizabeth. Rethinking the American labor movement (Routledge, 2017).
- Fink, Leon. In Search of the Working Class: Essays in American Labor History and Political Culture (1984)
- Fink, Leon (1991). ""Intellectuals" versus "Workers": Academic Requirements and the Creation of Labor History". The American Historical Review. 96 (2): 395–421. doi:10.2307/2163215. JSTOR 2163215.
  - Fitzpatrick, Ellen (1991). "Rethinking the Intellectual Origins of American Labor History". The American Historical Review. 96 (2): 422–428. doi:10.2307/2163216. JSTOR 2163216.
- Krueger, Thomas A. (1971). "American Labor Historiography, Old and New". Journal of Social History. 4 (3): 277–285. doi:10.1353/jsh/4.3.277. JSTOR 3786704.
- McCoy, Austin (2016). "Bringing the social back: rethinking the declension narrative of twentieth-century US labour history". Social History. 41 (1): 1–13. doi:10.1080/03071022.2015.1108705. S2CID 147426508.
- Mapes, Kathleen; Storch, Randi (2016). "The Making and Remaking of a Labor Historian: Interview with James R. Barrett". Labor: Studies in Working-Class History of the Americas. 13 (2): 63–79. doi:10.1215/15476715-3460852. S2CID 147867327.
- Pearson, Chad (2017). "Twentieth century US labor history: Pedagogy, politics, and controversies Part 1". History Compass. 15 (12) e12433. doi:10.1111/hic3.12433.
- Shelton, Jon. "Labor and Working Class—A Historiographical Survey." in The Routledge History of the Twentieth-Century United States (Routledge, 2018) pp. 149–160.
- Tomlins, Christopher (2013). "The State, the Unions, and the critical synthesis in labor law history: a 25-year retrospect". Labor History. 54 (2): 208–221. doi:10.1080/0023656X.2013.773148. S2CID 145335573.
- Walkowitz, Daniel J.; Haverty-Stacke, Donna T., eds. (2010). Rethinking U.S. Labor History: Essays on the Working-Class Experience, 1756-2009. New York: Continuum. ISBN 9781441145758.
- Zieger, Robert H. (1972). "Workers and scholars: Recent trends in American labor historiography". Labor History. 13 (2): 245–266. doi:10.1080/00236567208584204.
- Kessler-Harris, Alice. "Labor Movement in the United States." Shalvi/Hyman Encyclopedia of Jewish Women. 31 December 1999. Jewish Women's Archive. (Viewed on October 31, 2023) <https://jwa.org/encyclopedia/article/labor-movement-in-united-states>.
- Herberg, Will (1952). "Jewish Labor Movement in the United States: World War I to the Present". Industrial and Labor Relations Review. 6 (1): 44–66. doi:10.2307/2518609. JSTOR 2518609.
- Yellowitz, Irwin (1981). "Jewish Immigrants and the American Labor Movement, 1900–1920". American Jewish History. 71 (2): 188–217. JSTOR 23882031.
- Hardman, J. B. S. (1962). "The Jewish Labor Movement in the United States: Jewish and Non-Jewish Influences". American Jewish Historical Quarterly. 52 (2): 98–132. JSTOR 23873714.
- Antler, Joyce. "The History of Jewish Women in the United States." Oxford Research Encyclopedia of American History. 24 May. 2023; Accessed 1 Nov. 2023. https://oxfordre.com/americanhistory/view/10.1093/acrefore/9780199329175.001.0001/acrefore-9780199329175-e-1011. https://oxfordre.com/americanhistory/display/10.1093/acrefore/9780199329175.001.0001/acrefore-9780199329175-e-1011?rskey=rkv7s1&result=1#acrefore-9780199329175-e-1011-div1-5
- Walkowitz, Daniel. "The Jewish Working Class in America." Oxford Research Encyclopedia of American History. 29 Nov. 2021; Accessed 1 Nov. 2023. https://oxfordre.com/americanhistory/view/10.1093/acrefore/9780199329175.001.0001/acrefore-9780199329175-e-935. https://oxfordre.com/americanhistory/display/10.1093/acrefore/9780199329175.001.0001/acrefore-9780199329175-e-935?rskey=ysL3Ra&result=2#acrefore-9780199329175-e-935-div2-6

=== Primary sources ===
- Dubofsky, Melvyn, and Joseph McCartin, eds. American Labor: A Documentary Collection (Palgrave Macmillan US), 2004 312pp
- Rees, Jonathan, and Z. S. Pollack, eds. The Voice of the People: Primary Sources on the History of American Labor, Industrial Relations, and Working-Class Culture (2004), 264pp
- Gompers, Samuel. Seventy Years of Life and Labor (1925, 1985 reprint) online
- Gompers, Samuel. The Samuel Gompers Papers (1986– ) definitive multivolume edition of all important letters to and from Gompers. 9 volumes have been completed to 1917. The index is online.
- Powderly, Terence Vincent. Thirty years of labor, 1859–1889 (1890, reprint 1967). online
