= Santa Clara cherry strike of 1933 =

Labor action in California

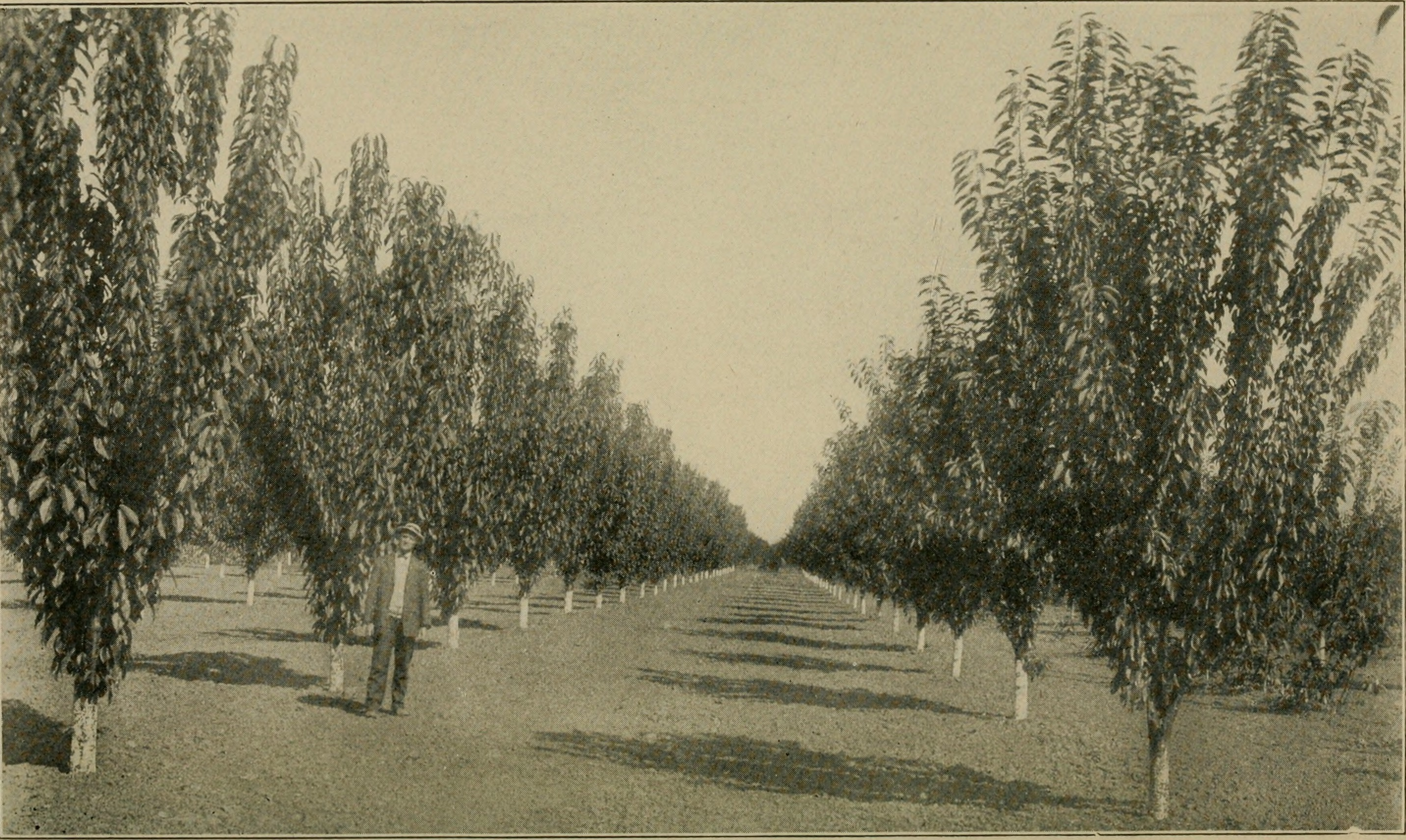
"Young cherry orchard in good form" (The California fruits and how to grow them, 1921)

In 1933 there was a cherry strike in Santa Clara, California. The main overview of the events in Santa Clara was an agricultural strike by cherry pickers against the growers or employers. As the events of the labor strike unfolded, the significance of the strike grew beyond that of the workers themselves into a broader scope within America.

== Background ==
In the 1930s there was a vast number of labor strikes that occurred within California specifically about agriculture known as the California Agricultural Strike 1933. The strikers were organized under the Cannery and Agricultural Workers' Industrial Union (CAWIU), a labor organization affiliated with the Communist party. Many of the strikers and workers were of the minority background, such as Mexicans and Filipinos. A primary reason for the strikes was that workers were demanding for increased wages as the standard wage of the average cherry picker was 20 cents per hour. Before the Santa Clara Cherry Strike, there were many previous strikes that occurred before 1933, such as the Santa Clara cannery strike in 1931. There was about a total of 40,000 California agricultural laborers that hit the picket line in 1933.

== Timeline ==
There were many strikes that began to occur within 1933. The CAWIU had been a major influence in mobilizing the California agricultural work force into strikes. 1933 was the year in which the United States held the most agricultural strikes, totaling at 61 strikes, with over half of them being in California. A reaction to the agricultural strikes within California was met received by the law enforcement as well as the press who took the side of the growers. Even though the initial group of agricultural strikes in April 1933 seemed to be successful, the growers began to recruit labor despite the strikes, therefore the influence of power the strikers had begun to diminish.

In mid June 1933, about 1000 cherry pickers on about 20 ranches struck for higher wages. Cherry growers had received economic losses in the previous years, thus led them to look for better prospects and to shut down any strikes. The pickers who joined the strike were met with opposition from the authorities armed with tear gas to suppress the workers.

June 13–14, 1933; cherry pickers met with the CAWIU to organize a plan of action. The CAWIU's plans for a workers’ strike unless the growers agreed to increase their workers’ demands were met, including: wages increased to 30 cents per hour, eight-hour work days, and the recognition of labor unions. The response to the demands was mixed, as smaller farmers gave in to pressure, while larger farmers did not recognize this. With the larger farms' refusal of the workers’ demands, they began their strikes on June 14, 1933, with estimated 500 cherry pickers striking at the orchards. Picketers formulated a plan that they determined once the largest orchards were to give in to the demands of the workers, the other orchards were to follow, thus the workers picketed at the large orchards.

June 16, 1933; the police arrested CAWIU organizer Patrick Callahan in the De Salvo orchard after the police in where he had received fractures in his skull and a broken jaw physically assaulted him. Callahan was released two days later on bail and returned to the strike despite his current state.

June 18, 1933; there was about nearly 1000 cherry pickers on 20 ranches in total that joined the picket line. Many pickers joined due to the excessive force that local authorities which were intended to demoralize and prevent others from joining.

June 24, 1933; many of the major growers within California gave into the demands of the picketers, as the fear of losing their crops was apparent. Even though most of the growers gave into the demands to raise the hourly wage of their workers from 20 cents per hour to 30 cents per hour, some continued to pay their workers at 20 cents. With the victory of the laborers over their employers, the CAWIU decided to end the workers’ walkout, but the employers still did not recognize them as a formal union.

== Aftermath ==
The cherry picker strikers did succeed in their strike for higher wages. White residents within the Santa Clara Valley began to organize with the purpose of rooting out Radicalism. Began a movement of fighting against communism within California. Even though there were exclusions against Filipinos, the fears of labor strikes and spread of communism continued to prosper. One agricultural grower, Charles Derby, gathered a movement and organized the county in the creation of the Associated Farmers of California to combat communism and labor unionization.

A significant importance to the results of the strike was that through the organization of all the laborers, this was a form of self-empowerment to a group that individually was powerless. The end result was the growers won against the strikers throughout the entire process.

After the strikes within the Santa Clara Valley in 1933, the CAWIU continued their campaign of gaining more membership within the union. Many of the union's membership consisted of workers that were Mexican, Anglo, Filipino, and black. Even after the massive strikes in 1933, the CAWIU continued to organize agricultural labor and put start strikes in order to fulfill the workers’ demands of higher wages and better working conditions. These strikes received the same reciprocation as the Santa Clara Cherry Strikes, resistance.

== Historical significance ==
The historical significance to the Santa Clara Cherry Strike was beyond that of just the individual workers, but was influenced by the government and the context of the time. While workers joined up with labor unions, specifically the CAWIU, in order to demand for better working conditions and wages, the state and federal government were fighting against them in order to rid the society of communist influence. Communism would become a major focus within American society within the same century especially during the Cold War.

== See also ==
- Strikes in the United States in the 1930s
