= 1885 Yonkers carpet weavers strike =

1885 labor strike in New York, US

- Alexander Smith & Sons weaving mills (1886)
- Date: February 20 – July 16, 1885
- Location: Yonkers, New York, US
- Caused by: Retaliation
- Goals: Restored wages, no more unfair pay docking, no more tyranny from the boss, reinstate fired union members.
- Result: Company agreed to recognize the union, raise pay, and reevaluate the docking system. The union agreed to provide notice before striking and try arbitration first.

Parties
Carpet weavers; Knights of Labor	Alexander Smith & Sons

On February 20, 1885, carpet weavers at Alexander Smith & Sons mills in Yonkers, New York, United States, went on strike after the company fired several women who had joined the newly-formed union. The union had been organizing for the better part of a year, forming their own chapter of the Knights of Labor and preparing to demand better wages and working conditions at the mills. Workers at the mills were predominantly young immigrants, with women making up approximately 75 percent of the workforce.

When the weavers went on strike and walked out, Smith responded by locking them out of the mills. What started with a group of weavers from the tapestry department at 10 AM grew to over 3,000 strikers by the end of the day. The following week, the strikers released a statement with their four core demands:

First, the restoration of wages paid before December 1, 1884; Second, a readjustment of the arbitrary and unjust system of docking adopted by the firm; Third, a reinstatement of all employees unjustly discharged and no one to be discharged in the future except for cause assigned; Fourth, NO MORE BOSS OR SUPERINTENDENT TYRANNY. [emphasis in source]

— Statement from the striking workers, printed in the Yonkers' Statesman on February 27, 1885.

The demand to end "TYRANNY" at the mills was a reference to a new disciplinary docking system that had been introduced over the past year. This system punished workers for many social and human behaviors: talking with other workers, eating meals with other workers, laughing out loud, and looking out a window (even just to get some fresh air) were all punishable behaviors under the new docking system rules, according to the workers. Sick and bereaved workers who missed a shift were also docked and risked being "discharged" (or fired) by management.

On July 16, after several months on strike, a settlement was reached in which the company agreed to increase workers' wages by rolling back a previous wage reduction and adding a 10 percent advance. Workers would no longer be punished for membership in the union, and the workers who had been fired back in February would be rehired. The company also promised to address the docking system. In return, the union agreed to provide notice in the future if they intended to strike, and they also agreed to arbitration as a first step. The union declared victory.
