= 1936 Seattle Post-Intelligencer strike =

- Reporters Everhardt Armstrong and Richard Seller, and photographer Frank Lynch, key strikers, 1936.
- Date: August 19 – November 29, 1936
- Location: Seattle, Washington

Parties
Newspaper Guild	Seattle Post-Intelligencer

Lead figures
Everhardt Armstrong, Richard Seller, Frank Lynch	William Randolph Hearst (Newspaper's owner)

The 1936 Seattle Post-Intelligencer Strike was a labor strike that took place between August 19 and November 29, 1936. It started as the result of two senior staff members being fired after forming an alliance and joining The Newspaper Guild. The strike halted production of the newspaper for the duration of the strike. The strike ended with a formal recognition of The Newspaper Guild.

== Background ==
The owner of the Seattle Post-Intelligencer was William Randolph Hearst, who by the 1920s controlled newspapers that were read by a quarter of all Americans. He also owned an International News Service and six magazines including Cosmopolitan and Good Housekeeping. He later owned a television newsreel and film company and once considered running for the President of the United States. Hearst is credited as a founder of yellow journalism by utilizing sensationalism or crude exaggeration in his publications. The most famous example of Hearst's yellow journalism was prior to the Spanish–American War. He consistently published articles about ongoing conflicts between the Spanish and the Cuban Revolutionaries, often over-exaggerating events that transpired or fabricating events altogether, which was credited for laying the groundwork for the Spanish–American War by angering the American people. Hearst's "combat dispatches" turned out to be correspondents at luxury hotel resorts whose sources were their own imaginations.

During World War I, the city of Seattle produced one-fifth of the United States wartime ship tonnage. A shipyard strike in 1919 brought national attention to Seattle when workers went on strike to keep their high wartime wages, which led to a general strike during February 6–10, the longest in American history. The strike fueled American fears of radical and socialist values, and gave Seattle a reputation of being at the heart of political radicalism. During the Great Depression, "Hoovervilles" started popping up around the city where nearly 1,000 unemployed residents would gather to stay in shacks at the empty shipyard south of Pioneer Square. World War II created an economic revival for companies like The Boeing Company, which increased employment by more than 1,200.

The American Newspaper Guild was founded in 1933 and led by a columnist named Heywood Broun. It was founded because traditional independent editorial workers were upset with their pay. The Guild became affiliated with the American Federation of Labor in 1936 and the Congress of Industrial Unions in 1937, two of the largest labor organizations in America.

== Strike ==
In August 1936, thirty-five of the approximately seventy employees from the Seattle Post-Intelligencer went on strike. Employees who went on strike were members of the American Newspaper Guild. Management at the paper found that a few of the veteran members of their staff had joined the Newspaper Guild union and were fired as a result. The strike stopped publication of the newspaper from August 20 to November 29.

Three members of the Newspaper Guild were among the most highly active during the strike: Everhardt Armstrong, Richard "Dick" Seller, and Frank Lynch. Armstrong gained a lot of hostility from management at the paper largely because he was a respected and experienced reporter who showed sympathy for causes of labor. Seller was a younger reporter who, shortly after getting married became reassigned to the "night police beat". This assignment was typically given to young and single reporters who were somewhat carefree. Seller joined the strike with the Newspaper Guild later and ended up becoming the president of the Guild's Seattle chapter. Lynch was the chief photographer for the Seattle Post-Intelligencer, whose department was seen as being disorganized and was fired once the management from the Hearst Corporation discovered he was a member of the American Newspaper Guild Union.

David Beck was another key figure in the strike. Beck was an organizer for the Teamsters and had responsibilities all along the Pacific Northwest and British Columbia, and later the entire West Coast. Strikers picketed outside the Seattle Post-Intelligencer and garnered attention from workers in the surrounding area. One group of those workers came from the waterfront and joined in the picket lines surrounding the building. Beck and the Teamsters then decided to refuse to drive past the picket lines, preventing the newspapers from being delivered.

William Hearst became more willing to make a deal with the union strikers once the pro-labor Franklin D. Roosevelt won a landslide re-election as U.S. president on November 3. A tentative agreement was reached and the P-I employees returned to work. Shortly after the end of the strike, Hearst hired Roosevelt's son-in-law, John Boettiger, as the paper's publisher. David Beck was the person who brokered the deal between the two sides, as the most influential member of the Seattle Central Labor Council. This victory allowed Beck to increase his influence and to gain a strong reputation as Seattle's premier labor leader. Beck also used this to help him in becoming the president of the International Brotherhood of Teamsters and to serve as chair of the UW Board of Regents.

During the strike, the employees of the Post-Intelligencer printed a separate paper of their own, The Guild Daily. It came to print on August 14, 1936, and sold 20,000 copies on its first day. By the end of its run, it had more than 60,000 readers. The news it covered included the strike, world news, and local sports news.

== Impact ==
The 1936 strike against the Seattle P-I was the first time in Seattle history that a newspaper staff went on strike. This was the first successful strike for the Newspaper Guild and one of the first instances of white-collar workers holding a successful strike, while building a reputation that Washington State laborers had power.

== See also ==
- Strikes in the United States in the 1930s
