= Seattle Fishermen halibut strike of 1912 =

Organized by Deep Sea Fishermen's Union, and lasted three months

The Seattle Fishermen's halibut strike of 1912 took place the year after a decision to establish the Port of Seattle and before construction had begun. The strike, organised by the newly formed Deep Sea Fishermen's Union, lasted three months. The issues causing the strike were working conditions, wages, and regulation of catches and prices, and by the terms on which it was settled the strikers achieved some of their aims.

== Background ==
The Port of Seattle came into existence on September 5, 1911, by a vote of the people of the Port District. One of the biggest factors that swayed the votes in favor of creating the port was the prospect of economic growth. However, port construction did not begin until 1913 with the creation of a home port for the local fishermen. This terminal was completed in 1914 and became the Northern Pacific Fishing Fleet's home of operations. In the meantime, against a background of political and economic change throughout Seattle, in November 1912 all halibut fishermen sailing out of the Seattle-Tacoma port went on strike.

== Deep Sea Fishermen’s Union ==
It was during this time that the Deep Sea Fishermen's Union (DSFU) was created by three steamship fishermen based at the port of Seattle. This union was formed based on the tough working conditions in the industry, including harsh weather conditions, unsafe working conditions, and long distance traveling. These aspects led to strikes by fishermen throughout the Seattle port, which were typically run by the Seattle Deep Sea Fishing Union members. However, crewmen as well as fishermen participated in this specific strike.

The Deep Sea Fishing Union is one of the small number of United States unions that support crewmen as well as fishermen. Its existence led to the formation of the Fishing Vessel Owners Association. This association has experienced many strikes against boat owners and other agencies.

== The strike ==
The striking fishermen and crewmen demanded higher wages, better working conditions, and an increase in the price of halibut from one cent per pound to one and a half cents per pound. The strike lasted from November 1912 until February 13, 1913 and caused a decline in fish harvest and consumption as well as impacting the economy of the port and further afield.

== Settlement ==
Eventually the Deep Sea Fishermen's Union and Seattle's port commissioners came to a compromise, by which the Union fishermen returned to work under the condition that halibut prices increase to one and a quarter cents per pound, close to their original request of one and a half cents per pound. The Deep Sea Fishermen's Union also took control of catch limits, thereby influencing prices. International fishing boundaries were re-established and bottom trawlers, which were affecting fish abundance, were banned. These measures meant that fishermen and crewmen would no longer need to travel such long distances in order to reach their quota.

Currently the Deep Sea Fishermen's Union continues to represent fishermen and crewmen throughout the Pacific Northwest at the North Pacific Fisheries Management Council meetings, as well as other fisheries regulation meetings. Its members are prepared to strike over any uncertainty or inequality regarding fishermen and crewmen within the fishing industry. The Halibut strike of 1912 is only one of many limited-scale strikes that have taken place within the Port of Seattle.

== See also ==
- Halibut Treaty
