= Patrick Chambers (labor organizer) =

American communist (1901–1990)

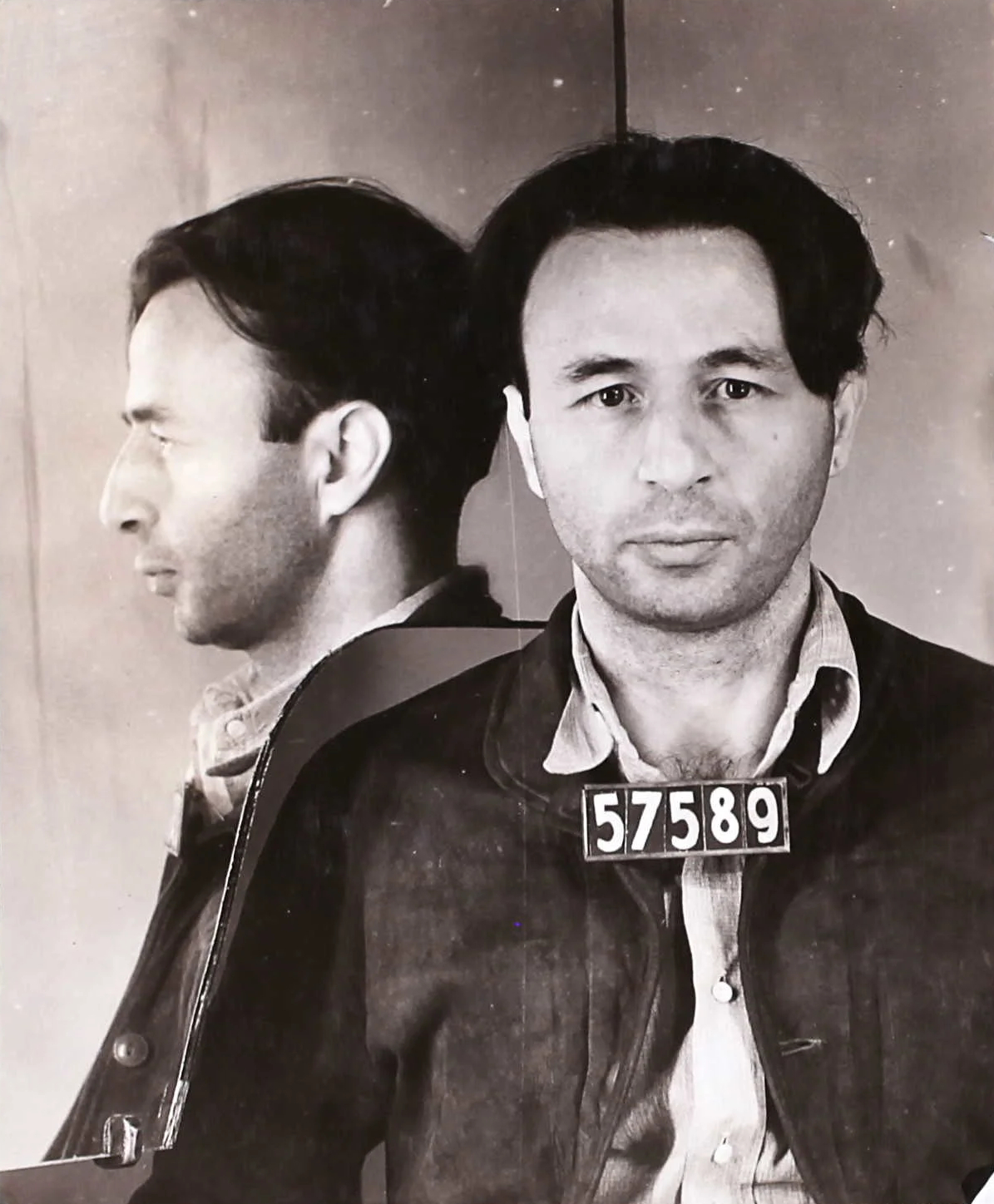
Chambers's San Quentin mugshot, 1935

Pat Chambers (born John Ernest Williams; September 13, 1901 – May 8, 1990) was an influential labor organizer and Communist Party member in California in the 1930s. He was a key figure in some of the largest California agricultural strikes of 1933. Chambers was the inspiration for the character "Mac" in John Steinbeck's 1936 novel, In Dubious Battle.

== Early years ==
Little is known of Chambers prior to his appearance in California in the late 1920s. Prison records give his birthplace as both Ohio and Massachusetts. In a 1972 interview, he alluded to having spent time in the Navy. His San Quentin intake card from April 27, 1935 describes him with a U.S. Navy tattoo of a flag and eagle.

== Union activism ==
Pat Chambers was an anarchist before he joined the Communist Party. Chambers had a philosophical interest in anarchism, and during the Sacco and Vanzetti trial encountered some of the “old Wobblies” who steered him towards union activities. In the early 1930s, Chambers was sent by the Communist Party to join in the early organization for the Cannery and Agricultural Workers' Industrial Union (CAWIU). The CAWIU planned to use unrest and oppressive labor conditions in California agriculture to organize strikes.

He was arrested in Los Angeles in September 1930 for “participating in a Communist unemployed demonstration in the public street one block from the plaza. Chambers was frequently arrested for his union activities and “was taken into custody twenty-five times between 1929 and 1936 as a result of his participation in strikes.

By 1931, Chambers moved to San Jose, where the Agricultural Workers Industrial League had changed its name to the Cannery and Agricultural Workers Industrial Union. The CAWIU operated under the leadership of the Communist party, and Chambers worked as the District Organizer for $5 per week while Caroline Decker, district secretary, was paid $7.50 a week.

Chambers was present during the Imperial Valley lettuce strike of 1930, though he described his initial work there as mostly observation. By February 1933, he was actively organizing lettuce pickers under the auspices of the CAWIU, and William Hynes, acting captain of the Los Angeles police department wrote to the Imperial County district attorney to warn about Chambers’ presence, calling him a “well-known communist agitator...going under the assumed name of John Williams."

== Tagus Ranch strike of 1933 ==
In the late summer of 1933, workers at the Tagus Ranch near Tulare, California were receiving 15 cents an hour to pick peaches, with “wages paid in scrip rather than legal currency." Chambers had spent weeks organizing workers to prepare for a strike. Workers demanded an end to scrip payment and an increase to 35 cents an hour. They also demanded an end to the requirement that they buy “at a company store that charged prices 25 to 30 percent higher than those outside the ranch. When 750 workers walked out on August 14, 1933, “Chambers...felt confident of victory.”

Before the Tagus Ranch strike went further, more than 2000 pickers walked off the job in Merced county. After Cal-Pak peach ranches in Merced increased their workers’ wages, the Tagus Ranch owners faced pressure to settle. Tagus Ranch owners agreed on August 18 to increase wages and rehire strikes, and “Chambers immediately ...declared the dispute at an end.”

In 1936, John Steinbeck published “In Dubious Battle,” in which he used the Tagus Ranch strike as “a major source of inspiration,” while the “character of Mac in the novel was based on the profile of Chambers that Steinbeck had gathered...” Chambers reportedly disliked the characterization that Steinbeck created, and in 1971 when Marc Grossman, then an aide to Cesar Chavez, met Chambers, “Chambers responded with a cascade of swear words” when asked if he had ever met Steinbeck.

== Cotton strike ==
By 1933 cotton was the second most valuable crop in California, and the state contained “more than 30 percent of all the large scale cotton farms in the country." That year, in contrast to the past 4 years, “an abrupt improvement in the nation’s agricultural economy…[sent] …the price of California cotton, steadily upward." Chambers and other organizers found it easy to convince the 15,000 farmworkers present for the harvest that higher wages were available for their work.

On September 19, 1933, valley growers belonging to the Agricultural Labor Bureau of the San Joaquin Valley met to determine the wage they would pay for cotton picking. Along with the growers, bankers and cotton ginners were present, and all wanted a share of the increased cotton profits. Pat Chambers “was permitted to attend the meeting and to read...the union’s demands: $1 per hundred pounds for picking." Other CAWIU demands including abolishing the contract labor system, and hiring through the union. The growers agreed to a wage of only 60 cents per hundred pounds.

CAWIU members voted on October 1 in Tulare to strike on October 4. As thousands of pickers refused to work, growers resorted to increasingly violent anti-strike tactics. In the Corcoran area of Kings County, growers went to employer-owned labor camps and gave families five minutes to decide to either resume working or face eviction. Those who didn't act quickly enough had their belongings dumped onto nearby highways. By October 9 almost 12,000 workers were on strike, and growers had decided to “use any level of force required to end the conflict." On October 10 in Pixley, Chambers was addressing a crowd of strikers who were protesting the arrest of other striking workers. Growers drove up brandishing rifles, shotguns, and other weapons and headed for the gathering, while Chambers, fearing violence, ordered workers to disperse.

The workers ran towards a union building at Chambers’ suggestion, but growers fired at them, killing two Mexican strikers and wounding eight others. The killings prompted protests, but local valley authorities issued 600 permits allowing growers to carry concealed weapons. Although authorities subsequently arrested the eight growers involved in the shooting, they also arrested Chambers a few days later in Visalia on a charge of criminal syndicalism. At a coroner’s jury inquiry into the shooting deaths, witness Al Smith testified that the farmers involved in the shooting had announced they were there to “get Chambers."

A fact-finding committee appointed by California Governor James Rolph convened in Visalia to hear testimony from the strikers about the violence initiated by the farmers. The strikers insisted on having Chambers brought from jail where he was held to testify, and when he was brought to the hearing, he was “given an ovation by the striking workers." A few days later, the motion to reduce his bond was denied and trial was set for November 21. Chambers’ trial took place in Visalia and the evidence was so weak that “even with a jury decidedly hostile to the defendant, a conviction could not be obtained." A new trial date was set for February 6. Chambers spent the time between the trials touring the San Joaquin valley and speaking to mass meetings organized by union locals.

== Criminal syndicalism trial ==
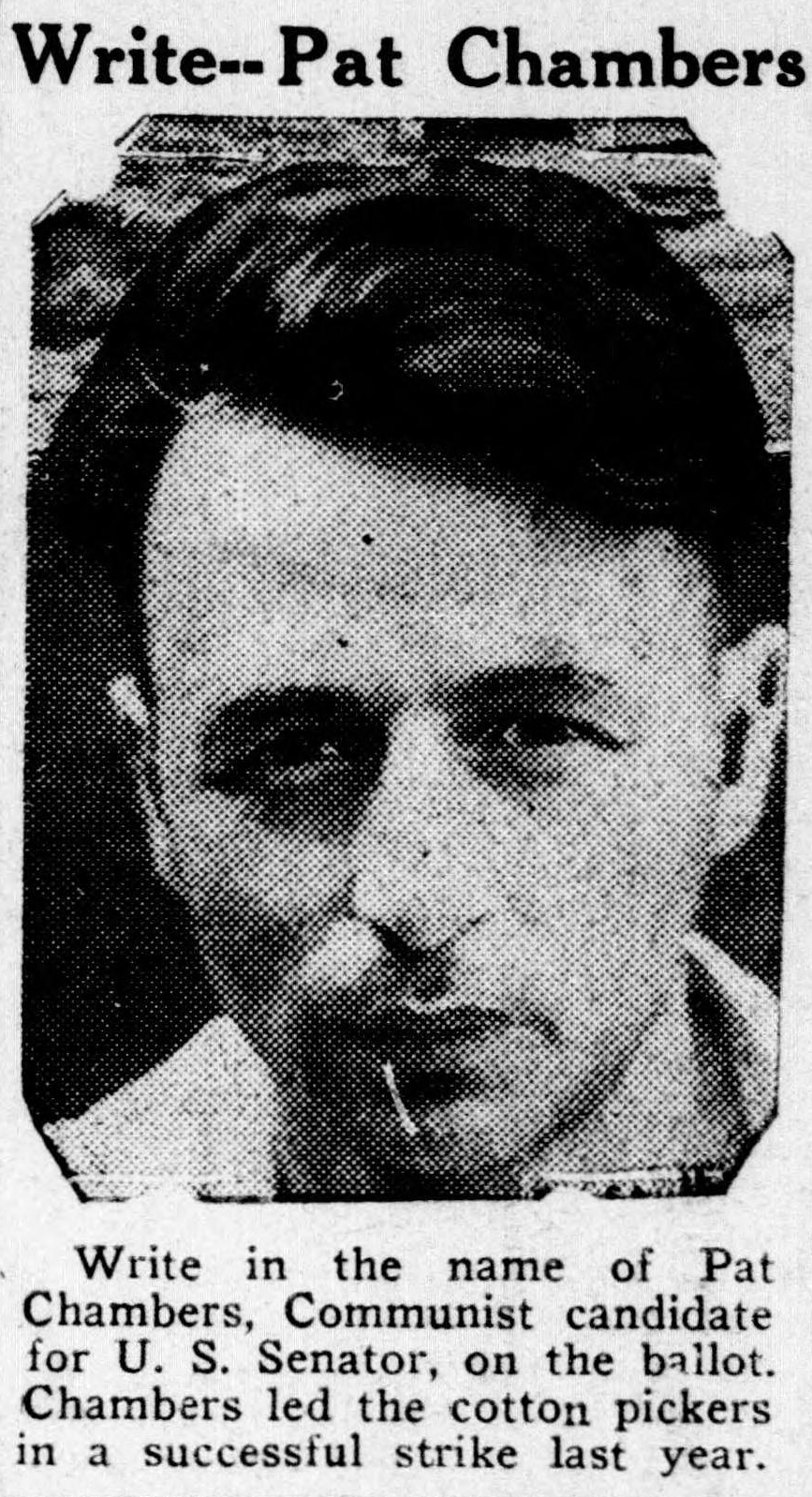
A clipping from the Western Worker promoting Chambers's write-in campaign for Senate, November 5, 1934

In 1934 as labor battles continued in California, the Associated Farmers of California spearheaded ongoing arrests of union leaders, and “effectively ended the organizing capacities of the CAWIU. CAWIU headquarters in Sacramento had been infiltrated by undercover operatives who sent information back to the Associated Farmers as well a to the Sacramento County district attorney.

On July 20, district attorney Neil McAllister along with Sacramento police chief William Hallanan raided the state headquarters of the CAWIU and arrested twenty-four suspected radicals on charges of vagrancy. The arrests were admitted to be prompted by “the pressure of agricultural interests." While the initial arrest cited Chambers for vagrancy, on August 15 Chambers, along with Caroline Decker and others, was indicted by a grand jury on charges of criminal syndicalism.

While waiting for the trial to begin, Chambers “was a representative of the Communist Party at the Socialist Party Convention." He was nominated as a candidate for the United States Senate at the state convention of the Communist Party in Sacramento and received 1,025 votes as a write-in candidate in the election in November.

The “Sacramento Conspiracy” trial began in January 1935. Both Chambers and Caroline Decker acted as their own attorneys, with assistance from attorney Leo Gallagher. Lasting for over four months, the trial was then the longest trial in California history. While the jury deliberated for sixty-six hours, and reportedly took 118 ballots to reach the verdicts, Chambers passed the time “reading a book entitled ‘Fascism and the Social Revolution.’ On April 1, the jury presented a verdict of guilty, and Chambers was sentenced to five years in prison. He was sent to San Quentin, where he served time until October 1937. On entering prison, his occupation was listed as “rigger” and his birthplace was recorded as Ohio.

== Appeal and release ==
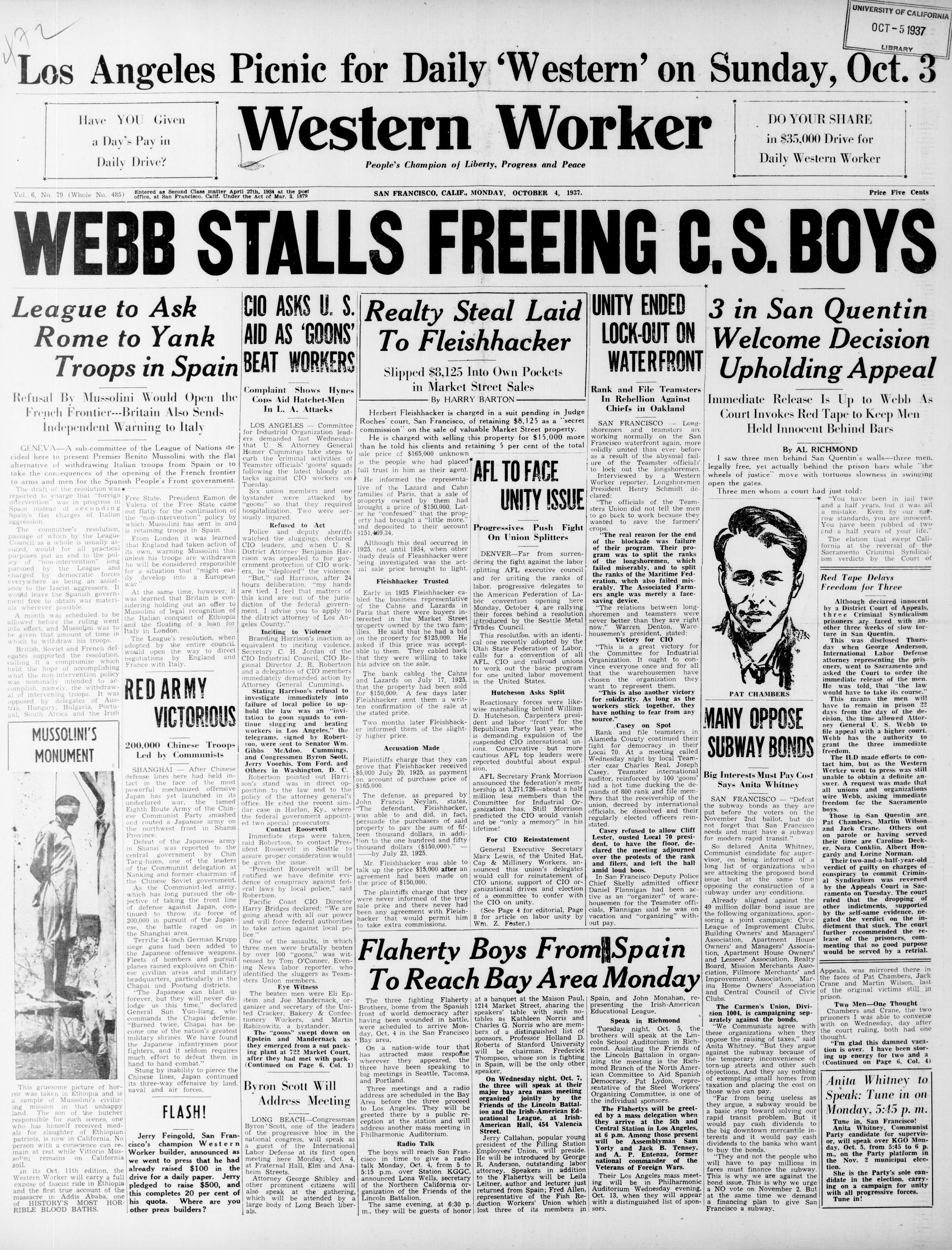
An illustration of Chambers on the cover of the Western Worker shortly after his successful appeal, October 4, 1937

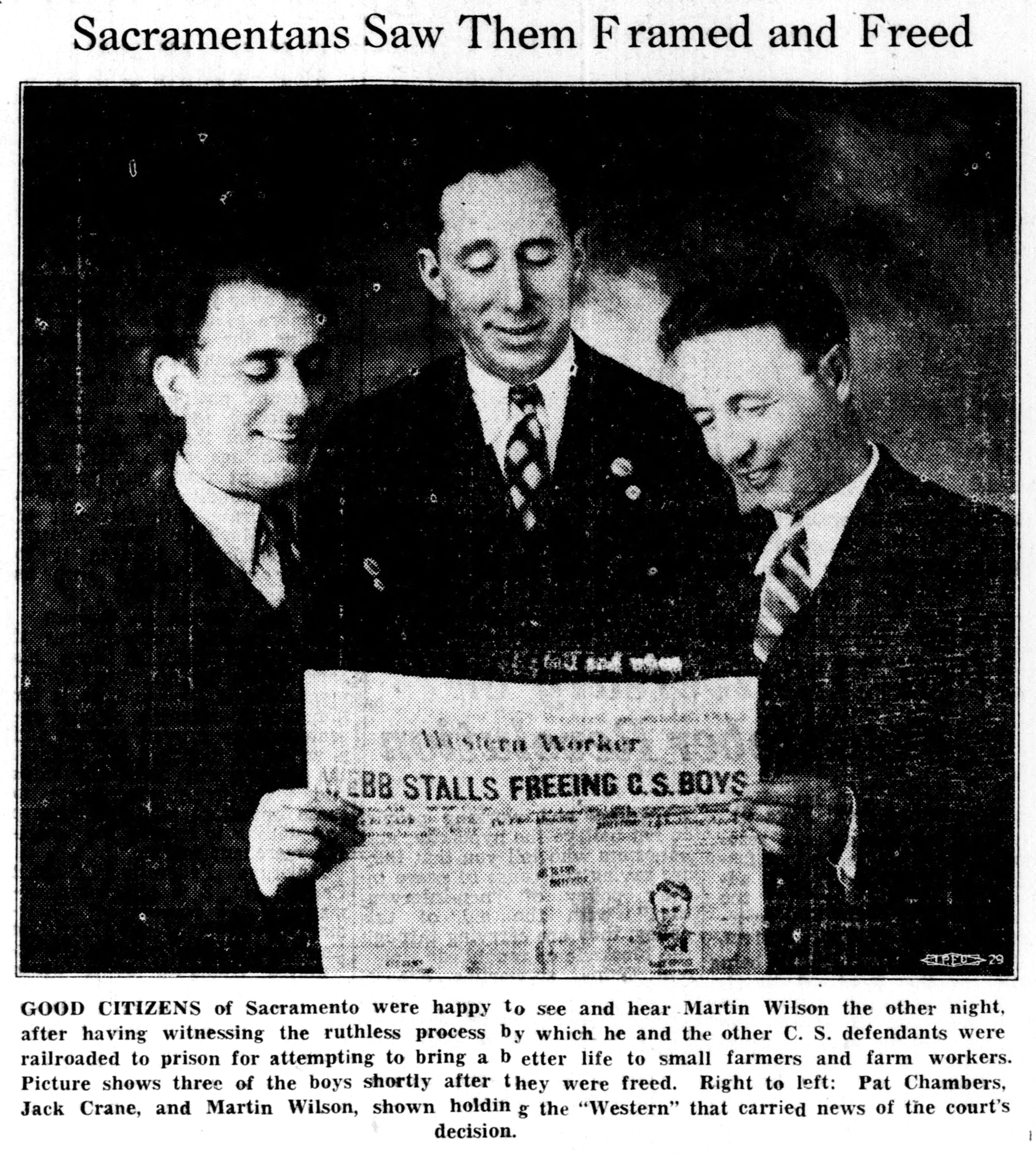
Chambers (right) and two others prosecuted under the California Criminal Syndicalism Act in a clipping from the Western Worker, November 15, 1937

The Third District Court of Appeal reversed the Sacramento verdict on September 28, 1937. The court essentially ruled that evidence presented of a speech made by Chambers in 1930 that was used to convict him of “criminal syndicalism” in 1934 was inadmissible as too remote in a trial in 1934.” Chambers was released from San Quentin on October 13, 1937.

== Later years ==
Chambers mostly vanished from the labor movement after his release from San Quentin. The inability of the American Communist Party to bring its trade union policies into the line required by the Comintern had effectively forced the demise of the Trade Union Unity League and the CAWIU by March 1935. Chambers told Cesar Chavez that after getting out of prison, he had gone to “San Francisco and joined the Carpenters’ Union.” He told Chavez that the “opposition was so severe, he couldn't organize farm workers anymore.”

Chambers effectively dropped out of the party and the labor movement and worked as a laborer, ultimately spending his last years as a member of the International Pile Drivers’ union in San Pedro, CA He came to United Farm Workers (UFW) headquarters near Delano in 1971 to talk with Cesar Chavez, telling him that he had “avoided coming to Delano during the five-year grape strike...out of fear that Chavez would be red-baited because of CAWIU’s Communist ties. Chavez had wanted to meet Chambers “for years...but nobody knew where he was.” During their meeting, one of Chambers’ old bodyguards, Gonzalo Flores, came and the two men “embraced and started recalling the strikes.

Chambers died in San Pedro, California, on May 8, 1990.
