= 1933 El Monte berry strike =

Labor action in California

- Part of California agricultural strikes of 1933
- Date: June 1 – July 6, 1933
- Location: El Monte, California

The El Monte berry strike was a labor strike that began on June 1, 1933, in El Monte, California. It was part of the California agricultural strikes of 1933, and like most of them was organized by the Cannery and Agricultural Workers’ International Union (CAWIU). By itself, it was one of the largest agricultural strikes in Southern California during the Great Depression, and was the first strike in the season to gain public attention. The berry strike affected local Japanese farm owners and growers.

== Background ==
The strike took place in the heart of the Great Depression and eventually involved over 7,000 workers. Conditions for field workers were difficult. The fact that twice as many workers as there were jobs in the San Gabriel Valley caused the walkout as well as bad conditions and low wages. Another problem was the inconsistency and insecurity of the wages, which were given based on the number of berries picked: workers probably could not count on having a guaranteed weekly or even daily wage.

=== Connection to local alien land laws ===
The El Monte Berry Strike brought to light the unique relationship between Mexican and Filipino agricultural workers, Japanese growers, white land owners and local El Monte officials. The town of El Monte's land ownership arrangements in 1933 were heavily influenced by the California Alien Land Law of 1913, which dictated who could own land and placed heavy restrictions on immigrants being allowed to own land outright.

The state of California experienced a heavy influx of Japanese immigrants from 1890 to 1920, which resulted in some immigrants becoming farmowners seeking ownership of land. However, California's alien land laws restricted Japanese growers' ownership rights, which led to growers leasing land from local white landowners. In 1933, the agreements between Japanese growers and white land lessors were actually in violation of California state law, the strike could have potentially exposed both Japanese lessees and white landowner lessors' land arrangements. The situation was profitable for both sides with “roughly 80% of the 600-700 acres of land in El Monte” being leased by Japanese growers.

If local officials could prove there was the possibility of a conspiracy between the white landowners and the Japanese growers, both the Japanese lessee and white landowner stood to lose ownership of the land if local officials enforced the law. Tensions between Mexican berry pickers, Japanese growers, white landowners, and local officials were poised to bring unwanted attention to the profitable illegal agricultural arrangements that were in place in El Monte.

White landowners were also worried that if Mexican and Filipino agricultural workers were successful in striking against their Japanese employers, they would strike against white landowners next. Thus, white landowners, the El Monte and Los Angeles Chambers of Commerce, the Los Angeles Police Department, and the Los Angeles County Sheriff's Department supported the Japanese farmers in the strike.

== Cause and development ==
Wages were constantly shifting and the work was insecure, with worker's wages not being guaranteed weekly or even daily. Workers were paid per crate of berries, depending on the kind of berries picked. Strikers, initially, demanded a raise to a consistent 35 cents per hour (the workday was usually 10–12 hours), which was promptly rejected by Japanese American farmers. The Japanese countered with an offer of 20 cents per hour, but that was also rejected by the strikers. Hourly wages prior to the strike were disputed: the Los Angeles Chamber of Commerce placed estimates as high as 25 cents per hour, while workers argued the average was 15 cents and that 9 cents per hour wages were not unusual.

With no workers to pick fruit during a critical harvest season, Japanese farmers looked for support from organizations within the Japanese community to help pick berries. Children were excused from school to help while friends and relatives came from around Southern California to aid in the harvest.

The El Monte Chamber of Commerce had a vested interest in keeping Mexican and Filipino workers non-unionized and used tactics such as red-baiting to turn public opinion against the strikers.

The month-long strike ended on July 6, 1933, with field workers winning a pyrrhic victory: the workers won an increased daily wage of $1.50 a day, but on July 10 the Bureau of Industrial Relations declared that the agreement was only binding on the vegetable farms on the coast, and did not apply to the berry farms in the valley. The Japanese Chamber of Commerce, with the support of the white community, recommended that further participants in Mexican labor strikes be deported, and an entire growing season had been lost with families earning no wages.

== Historical significance ==
Japanese American farmers in El Monte essentially "won" the strike, but only because their interests overlapped with those of white landowners. Furthermore, the defeat of the strikers was part of a larger anti-union campaign.

The dismal outcome from the strike for agricultural workers resulted in the CAWIU essentially being extinguished by 1934. Japanese farmers would go on to play a similar middleman role in the Venice celery strike in 1936 and in the rise of the Nisei Farmers League in the 1970s.
