= Associated Farmers of California =

American anti-labor organization

The Associated Farmers of California was an influential anti-labor organization in California between 1934 and 1939. Agricultural and business leaders formed the organization to counter growing labor activism in California. The AF was responsible for substantial violence in reaction to agricultural strikes; the creation of anti-picketing ordinances; and spying on the activities of labor organizations. After a US Senate investigation into its actions and the advent of WW2, it lost influence and eventually disbanded. “The reign of the AF would only come to an end when the LaFollette Committee turned its scrutiny towards its activities in 1939 and 1940." The committee's attention short-circuited the AF's attempt to expand across the United States.”

== Founding and Mission ==
The Associated Farmers Association was created as a reaction to the growing labor movement in California in the 1930s as farmworkers agitated for increased wages and improved working conditions. The AF was “[o]rganized in Fresno on 28 March 1934 by members of the California State Chamber of Commerce and the California Farm Bureau” and the founders considered it as “an emergency organization set up to prevent a recurrence of the strikes of 1933.” Numerous farm organizations including the Grange and the Farm Bureau already existed, but the AF “arose in 1934 out of the numerous citizen associations that were created in 1933 to combat farmworker unionization.” As the number of annual strikes increased in the 1930s, AF chapters spread throughout the state, with 42 chapters eventually in place and “the total number of individuals mobilized probably exceed[ing] 50,000 and may have been as high as 70,000."

The Associated Farmers were determined to prevent any labor actions by agricultural union organizers along with most labor reforms. They opposed housing programs and the farm minimum wage. They fought against a bill prohibiting the California Highway Patrol from making arrests in strikes, a bill mandating the inspection of labor camps by outside parties, and even a bill that would require farmers to provide their workers with drinking cups. “Not one bill which the Associated Farmers opposed in 1939 got through the legislature.” In 1935, Herman Cottrell, Associated Farmers official and organizer of its paramilitary California Cavaliers, declared, “We aren't going to stand for any more of these organizers from now on; anyone who peeps about higher wages will wish he hadn't.”

== Funding, Leadership, and Politics ==
The founders and leading contributors to the Associated Farmers were not only farmers, but businesses with links to agriculture. “These included packing companies, ginning combines, transportation, power and finance companies. ... The industrial supporters of the AF were among the largest corporations in California." Financial supporters included “the Southern Pacific Railroad, the Pacific Gas & Electric Company ...the Holly Sugar Corporation, and the Spreckels Investment Company." These donors provided substantial funding. From May 1934 to November 1939 the AF collected $184,231. The “ten largest contributors to the Associated Farmers, though constituting but the smallest fraction of 1 percent of all contributors, provided 44.3 percent of all funds."

In the 1930s the Associated Farmers opposed worker housing programs, and during “the Merriam administration...blocked forty pro-farm labor bills... . Another 140 were blocked in the Olson administration." The real extent of the business community's support of the Associated Farmers was only fully revealed during the Senate inquiry into the group's anti-labor activities, which were determined to violate free speech and assembly as well as the right of labor to organize and bargain collectively.

== Actions During California Labor Strikes ==
The Associated Farmers kept files on more “than a thousand suspected subversives (read, union organizers), sharing this information with police officials throughout the state." Operatives from the AF requested information from growers so they could identify problematic labor organizers. The Associated Farmer employed spies to infiltrate labor organizations and kept lists of union activists so that employers could avoid hiring them. A letter from the Associated Farmers to the Olive Hillside groves requested their help “To better assist you in determining any possible agitators or workers with undesirable affiliations in your employment, we are asking you to mail us a complete list of your pickers or field laborers."

The Associated Farmers also helped form citizens’ groups to mobilize against farmworkers, mostly with the support of local law enforcement. “The cooperation and mobilization of civilian groups was endorsed by the Peace Officers Association of the State of California as a means of combating "subversive" activity." These groups were often involved in violent repression of labor actions and strikes. “The citizen groups were responsible for a series of vigilante attacks on farmworkers and their organizers. The vigilantes were untrained in police tactics but were nonetheless armed with 20 inch pick axe handles, and in some cases tear gas, and turned loose on strikers." By 1936, led by Colonel Walter E Garrison, “...the emphasis was on breaking all strikes through the mass deputization of farmers."

In 1939 Carey McWilliams characterized the Associated Farmers of California as Farm Fascists. The Associated Farmers used California's anti-syndicalism laws to prevent strikes and destroy the CAWIU. Local anti-picketing ordinances sprang up throughout California, and “the Associated Farmers helped secure the passage of such ordinances.” These ordinances had sweeping prohibitions on speech (and were later deemed unconstitutional) including “prohibit[ing] the use of language...that tended to provoke a breach of the peace...” and making it “unlawful for any person to utter...or to make any loud noise or to speak in a loud or unusual tone...” to prevent people from patronizing a business under labor negotiations." The anti-syndicalism laws also helped put numerous labor leaders like Pat Chambers, Caroline Decker, and others into jail, successfully breaking strikes through "eliminat[ing] union leadership." Once strikers or organizers had been arrested, the Associated Farmers worked closely with prosecutors, even going “..so far as to hire District Attorney Elmer Heald of Imperial County to prepare the criminal syndicalism indictment for his Sacramento County counterpart...”

The AF believed that “Communists were attempting to organize the farm workers of California” and in fact most of the organizers they cited were openly Communist. But “the Associated Farmers were after something else: the suppression of farm labor through a Red Scare, and it worked."

== The Senate Investigation ==
After the successes the Associated Farmers achieved against strikes in Salinas in 1936 and Stockton in 1937, the tide began to turn against the group. In December 1939, Senator Robert La Follette Jr opened a Senate subcommittee hearing into the “Violations of Free Speech and the Rights of Labor,” to investigate numerous “violations of the rights of free speech and ...undue interference with the right of labor to organize and bargain collectively." The committee hearings took testimony and incorporated letters and memoranda from numerous members of the Associated Farmers, including S. Parker Frisselle (the AF's first president) and Colonel Walter Garrison, who succeeded Frisselle in 1936. The hearings in Los Angeles in January 1940 focused on the Imperial Valley Strike of 1935. The committee heard testimony on the violence in the 1934 lettuce strike, attacks on attorneys, vigilantism, and even a motion by the local Associated Farmers group of the Imperial Valley to investigate the cost of machine guns to arm the sheriff's office.

The publication by Carey McWilliams of “Factories in the Fields” in 1939 had already helped to shine a light on the actions of the Associated Farmers, as did John Steinbeck's publication in 1939 of The Grapes of Wrath (which referred to a fictional “Farmers' Association” intended to stand for the Associated Farmers). In 1940 the La Follette committee ended its investigations by reporting that “the economic and social plight of California's agricultural labor is miserable beyond belief.” The conclusions of the La Follette committee report found a “conspiracy to suppress constitutional rights that ...made California seem more a fascist European dictatorship than part of the United States." But although the American public had seen "a damning indictment of the abusive labor policies that prevailed in California's industrialized agriculture," no member of the Associated Farmers suffered more than public exposure, and a decade of mostly losses during labor strikes left the farmworker movement crippled. The public testimony revealed during the La Follette committee hearings, along with the advent of World War 2 and the fading of the Great Depression, all contributed to the gradual elimination of the Associated Farmers as a significant source of union opposition in California.
