= Vacaville tree pruners' strike =

1932 California tree pruners strike

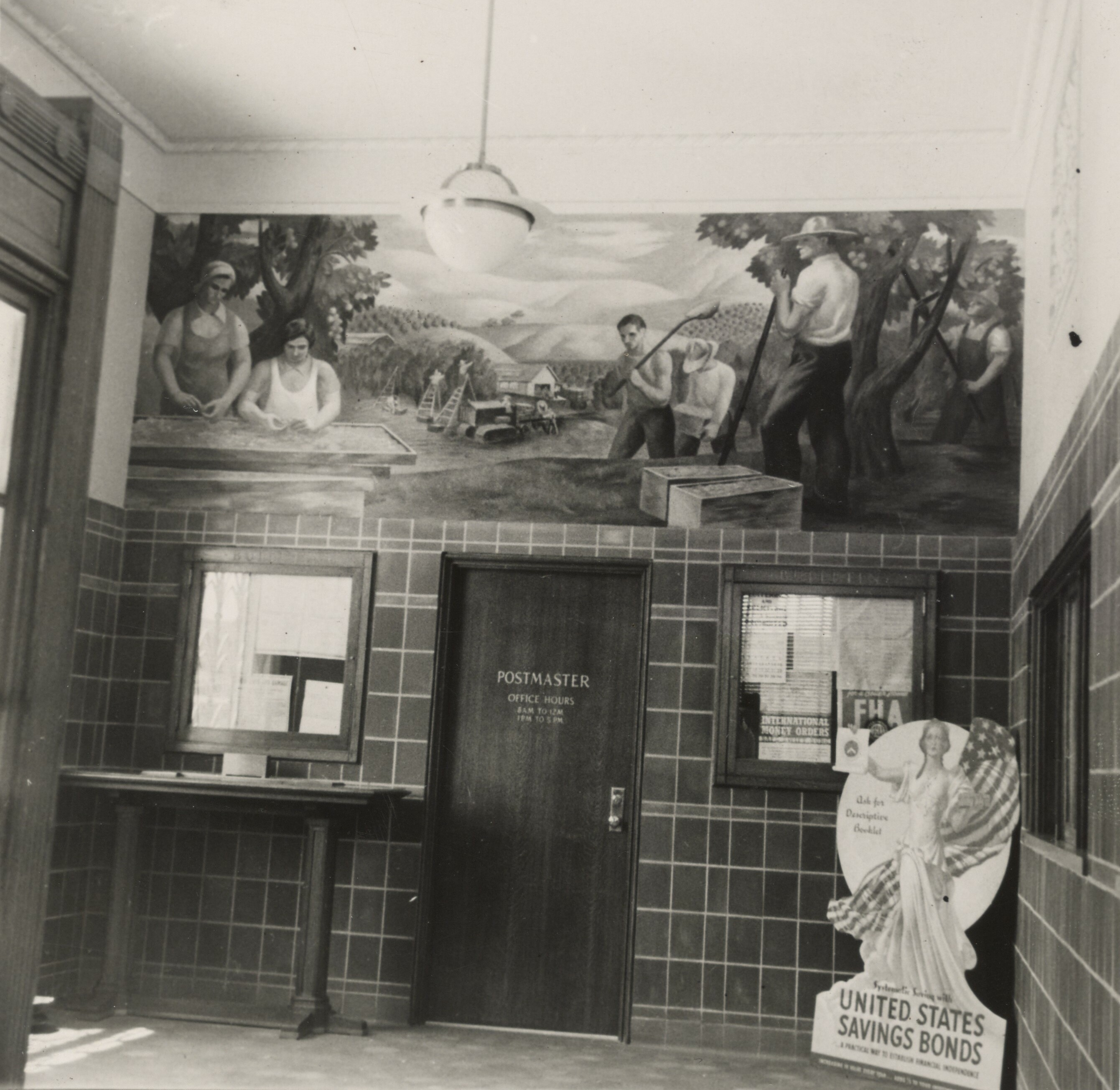
Fruit Season mural painted by Emrich Nicholson for the Vacaville post office, 1939

The Vacaville tree pruners' strike of 1932 was a two-month strike beginning on November 14 by the CAWIU in Vacaville, California, United States. The strikers were protesting a cut in tree pruning wages from $1.40 for an eight-hour workday to $1.25 for a nine-hour workday. The strike was characterized by multiple violent incidents including a break-in at the Vacaville jail that resulted in the kidnapping and abuse of six arrested strike leaders. The strikers were ultimately unsuccessful in demanding higher wages and fewer hours, and the CAWIU voted to end the strike on January 20, 1933.

== Background ==
The Cannery and Agricultural Workers' International Union (CAWIU), formerly known as the Agricultural Workers' Industrial Union (AWIU), was a Communist-aligned union active in California in the early 1930s. Early in its career the CAWIU involved itself primarily in spontaneous agricultural strikes, including the Santa Clara Valley cannery workers strike in July 1931 and the California pea pickers strike in May 1932. However, the union focused little on recruiting and organizing a large group of permanent members. Following the failures of these two strikes the CAWIU leaders realized the difficulty of establishing a solid agricultural labor movement around spontaneous and unplanned uprisings.

The CAWIU became more effective in its operating and organizing due to the leadership of Sam Darcy. Darcy became the organizer for District 13 (which included California, Nevada, and Arizona) of the Communist Party USA in 1931. At the time, District 13 had a membership of less than 300 and a treasury of $6. Darcy's main focus was organizing California's unemployed and agricultural workers. He immediately began recruiting and training organizers from the working class because he believed they would relate to, and thus more easily recruit, the California farmworkers. Darcy felt that the only hope of success for the Communist Party in District 13 was to disregard its own political interests in favor of improving the wages and working conditions of the workers.

Inspired by Darcy's leadership, the CAWIU called a conference of all its members on July 18, 1932, with the purpose of establishing a basis for strong organization. The CAWIU resolved to maintain its headquarters in San Jose as a concentration point from which the union would expand. Second, conference delegates agreed that the union's leadership must be reflective of its membership in terms of race, sex, and age. Third, they agreed that all union activities were to enforce demands regarding wages, working conditions, and union recognition, and that careful organization was necessary for any union action. To ensure that every farm worker could afford membership the delegates established the lowest possible initiation fees and monthly dues. Employed workers paid an initiation fee of 50 cents and unemployed workers paid only 10 cents, while monthly dues were 30 cents for working members and 5 cents for the unemployed.

During the months following the San Jose conference, CAWIU organizers were greatly active in the three-valley region of Santa Clara, Salinas, and Pajaro, which they selected at the conference for special attention. However, this did not mean that other areas were neglected. For several months a group of CAWIU organizers from Sacramento had been actively recruiting farm workers in Vacaville. When orchardists cut their tree pruners' wages on November 14, 1932, the CAWIU had gained ample influence among local farm workers to call the first prearranged strike in its history.

== Timeline ==
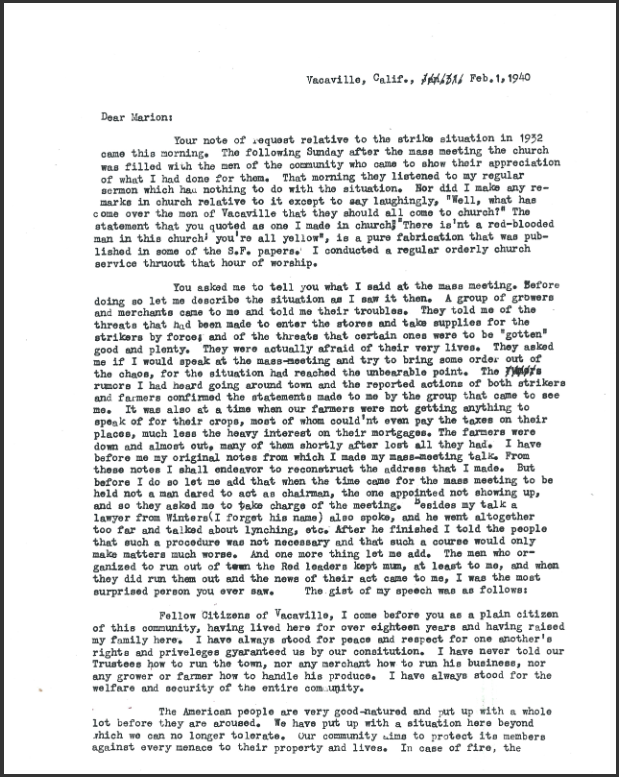
Letter from Rev. Arthur F. Fruhling to daughter Marion Fruhling regarding the Vacaville Tree Pruners' Strike of 1932 (Page 1)

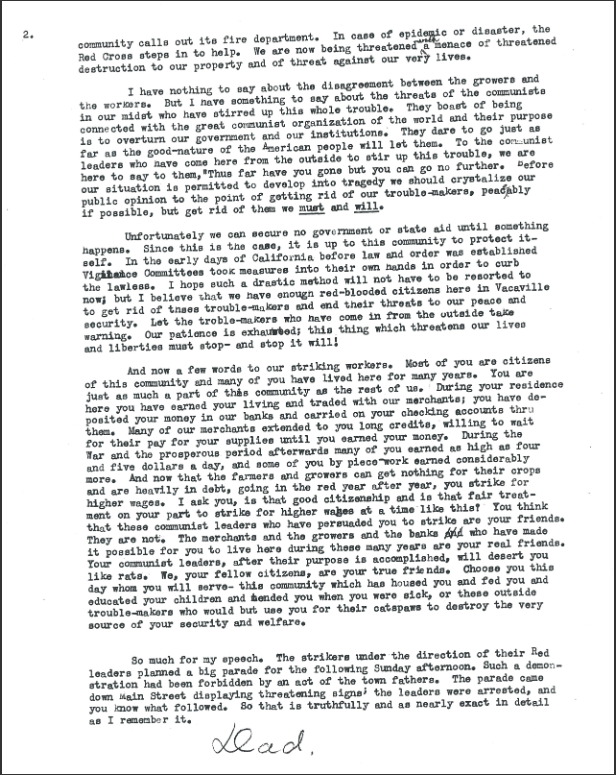
Letter from Rev. Arthur F. Fruhling to daughter Marion Fruhling regarding the Vacaville Tree Pruners' Strike of 1932 (Page 2)

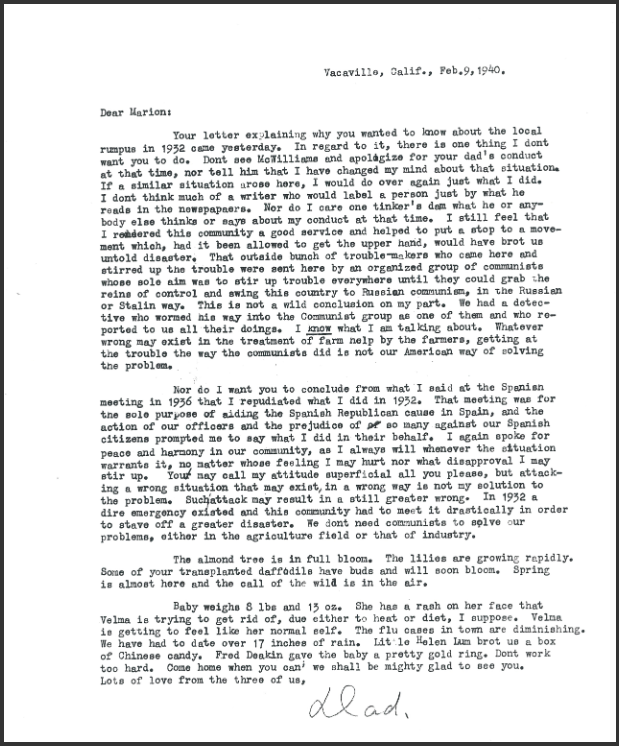
Follow-up letter from Rev. Arthur F. Fruhling to daughter Marion Fruhling with further clarification on the Vacaville Tree Pruners' Strike of 1932

=== Farm owners cut wages ===
On November 10, Frank H. Buck announced that the wage for tree pruning would be cut to $1.25 for a nine-hour workday beginning November 14. Buck was Vacaville's largest grower who, just a few days prior on November 8, had been elected as a Democrat to the U.S. House of Representatives, receiving support from nearly every voting farm worker in his district. This was due to the fact that, prior to his election, Buck publicly announced his intention to pay tree pruners $1.40 for an eight-hour workday while other local orchardists were paying $1.25.

=== The strike begins ===
The strike began on November 14, the day Buck's reduced wage rate went into effect, when 400 Spanish, Japanese, Filipino, and white tree pruners walked off their jobs. 250 of the workers were CAWIU members and the others were quickly joining. The union issued its strike demands that same day: a wage of $1.50 for an eight-hour workday, a guarantee of no discrimination on the basis of race, sex, or union activity, and formal recognition of the CAWIU by farm employers. In response, the affected employers offered $1.20 for an eight-hour workday. Unwilling to accept this offer, yet lacking essential resources to sustain the strike, the CAWIU looked to outside help. The Workers' International Relief pledged its full support within a few days and the International Labor Defense offered its services to those workers arrested during the strike.

=== The first confrontation ===
The first confrontation of the strike occurred on November 21 when strikers barricaded the main street of Vacaville. Their goal was to prevent trucks carrying strikebreakers from reaching the affected orchards on the outskirts of town. Vacaville police chief O. E. Alley attempted to remove a barricade of boxes, and the strikers tried to stop him, thus sparking a confrontation. Police, who were greatly outnumbered, attempted to arrest six strike leaders but eventually released them after being surrounded by a large mob of picketers. No one was hurt in the incident.

=== Riot on November 25 ===
More than a dozen individuals, including five Vacaville police officers, were injured during a riot between strikers and strikebreakers on November 25. The officers and strikebreakers were attacked, after removing street barricades, while attempting to move their truck through the crowd of strikers. One of the strikers, identified as John Lopez, attacked one of the strikebreakers, identified as Arthur Boom, with pruning shears. Boom leaped from the truck and attacked Lopez, starting a riot between about 300 strikers, strikebreakers, and officers. The officers used clubs to attack the strikers, while the strikers used pruning shears and rocks as weapons. One officer, Deputy Sheriff George Frazier of Fairfield, was knocked unconscious when struck on the head by a rock. Another unidentified officer had his finger tip bitten off.

=== Library riot on December 4 ===
On December 4 more than 150 strikers met at the home of John Lopez, the first person to attack during the November 25 riot, and marched together to the city library. The crowd of strikers, led by a front line of young women, chanted and carried banners reading "$1.50 and eight hours" and "Free Donald Bingham," a demonstrator arrested at the November 25 riot. The strikers reached the library, where they were met by Vacaville police chief O. E. Alley and a large group of Vacaville citizens. Speeches were given by strike supporters such as James Melgar of Vacaville, Robert Nelson of San Jose, and Nora Conklin of Sacramento, all of whom were eventually arrested that day. The crowd grew to nearly 1000 people, most of them Vacaville townsmen and farm owners.

The riot started during a speech by Nora Conklin, an International Defense League worker, who urged the strikers to return to the Lopez home. Banners were ripped from the hands of strikers, sparking a clash between the citizens of Vacaville and the striking workers. Strikers were hit and knocked to the ground; many were injured in the chaos of more than 1000 people, and officers were unable to control the angry crowd. Officers placed twelve individuals under arrest, all of them strikers or speakers, charging them with conducting a meeting without the consent of the city council.

=== Vacaville jail incident and community response on December 5 ===
The day after the riot at the city library, a group of about 30 masked men invaded the Vacaville jail, kidnapped six strike leaders, and drove away with them in seven waiting automobiles, warning journalists and other townspeople not to follow. They drove fifteen miles from the jail, where they shaved the strikers' heads, beat them, and covered them with red paint. The kidnappers then turned the strike leaders loose, warned them not to return to Vacaville, and drove off. Police chief O. E. Alley said those who entered the jail had somehow obtained the necessary keys but gave no explanation as to how. Frank H. Buck publicly condemned the act, urging Vacaville residents to proceed with the strike by lawful means. Sheriff's officers also condemned the act but little was done in effort to identify or arrest the kidnappers.

The International Labor Defense sent telegrams condemning the incident to California's Governor Rolph, the mayor of Vacaville, and Vacaville police chief O. E. Alley. The telegrams, signed by the International Labor Defense's national secretary William L. Patterson, demanded the immediate arrest of all individuals and town officials involved in the incident.

That afternoon it was reported that the Sacramento communists would retaliate in force against Vacaville. The word spread throughout the county, and angry citizens from all the towns began to gather in Vacaville to fend off the impending invasion. A large crowd of Solano County citizens gathered in front of the library and listened to speeches by Rev. Arthur F. Fruhling and Judge Bell from Winters. The speeches were on the subject of "the real menace to this community," and reaffirmed the resolve of the citizens of Vacaville to protect their town and families.

=== The end of the strike and aftermath ===
After more than 2 months the CAWIU had exhausted its resources, and the strikers' determination to continue the strike had weakened. Intimidation by local antilabor forces, farm owners, and townsmen was taking its toll; relief from outside sources was dwindling, and attendance at strike meetings had drastically fallen. When American Federation of Labor officials sided with employers in the dispute, union leaders recognized that the strike had reached its end. At a meeting on January 20 CAWIU members voted to end the strike. The strikers were ultimately unsuccessful in achieving their demands. Union leaders recognized that, in order for it to have been successful, the strike should have been called at harvest time when farm employers would be under immediate pressure to reach a settlement.

== Historical significance ==
The Vacaville tree pruners' strike saw great displays of anti-communist sentiment from the farm owners and townspeople. Employers gained the support of many Vacaville citizens through appeals to anti-communism. Farmers and local businessmen organized a large anti-communist rally on December 2 where a local churchman (Rev. Arthur F. Fruhling) branded the CAWIU as a tool for Communist corruption in California. They also heard a judge from a nearby town (Judge Bell from Winters) suggest lynching as a means of combatting the "red" strikers. This anti-communist sentiment was carried on to the Vacaville jail incident three days later when masked men kidnapped six strike leaders and, among other abuses, covered them with red paint.

City and county authorities supported the employers' efforts to undermine the strikers. The mayor of Vacaville at the time, who was one of the largest orchardists in the area, facilitated the cooperation between employers and public authorities throughout the strike. Yet despite the efforts of local authorities and employers, the strikers were successful in keeping strikebreakers out of the affected orchards during the early weeks of the strike. During the later stages, however, mass picket lines were made up of mostly women and children in an effort to protect male strikers from further violence and physical abuse.

For the CAWIU, the Vacaville defeat was a setback, but the strike served as a learning experience for successful strike leadership. Under Sam Darcy's leadership, a group of new and able organizers had taken over the CAWIU, and, by the end of the strike in 1933, the union had gained the attention, respect, and confidence of California farm workers.

== See also ==
- Strikes in the United States in the 1930s
