= 1936 Venice celery strike =

1936 U.S. labor action

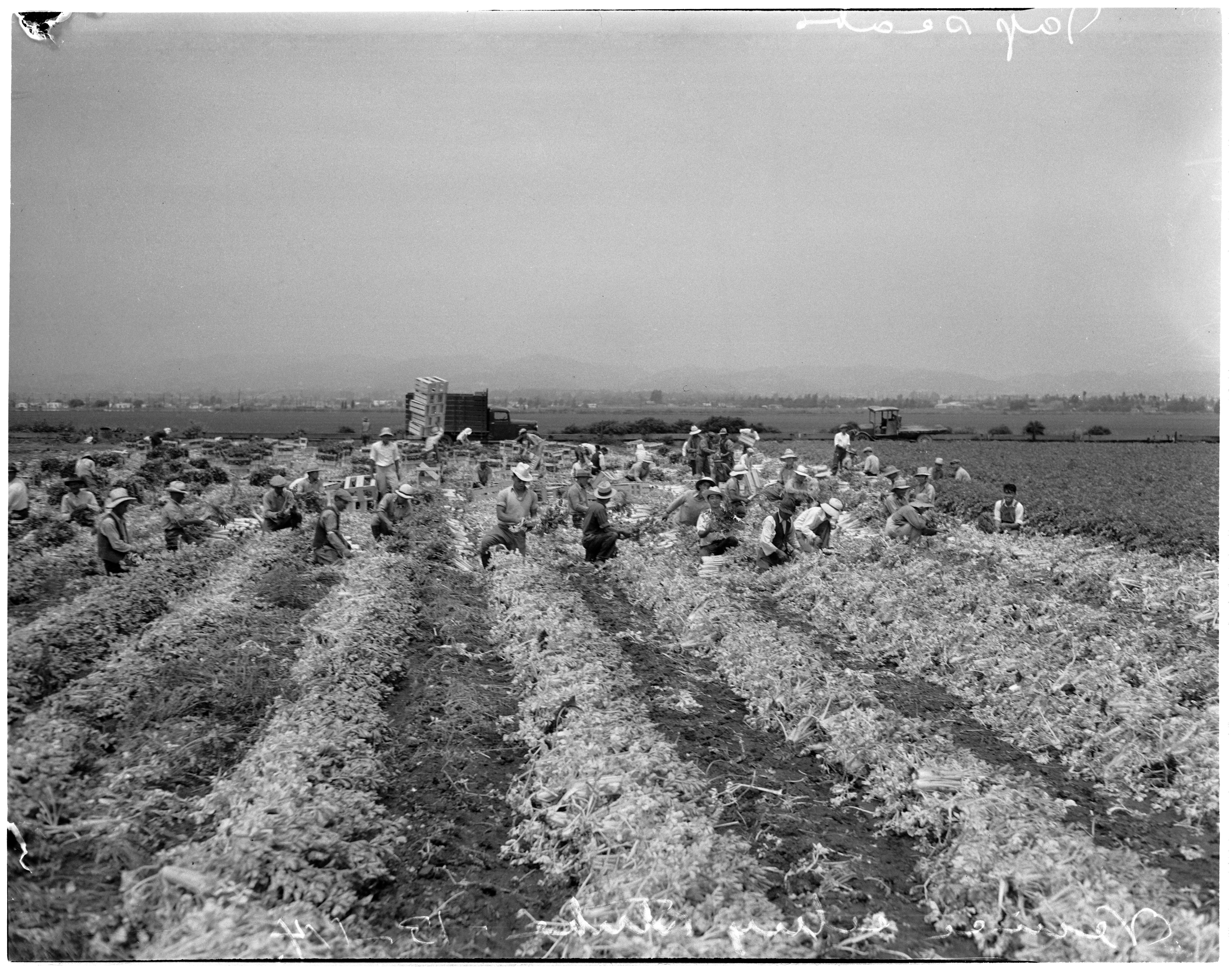
- Venice celery fields, Los Angeles, 1936 (Illustrated Daily News via UCLA Digital)

The 1936 Venice celery strike was a labor action in Venice, California (in Los Angeles County) that lasted from April 20, 1936 to May 27, 1936. A 1938 history of Asian-American and Latino/Hispanic labor action prepared by the Federal Writers' Project stated that the strike was called by CUCOM (Confederación de Unión Campesinos y Obreros Mexicanos) in order to negotiate "higher wages and better hours." The strike was reportedly "attended by considerable violence."

The strikers were Mexican American, Filipino American, and Japanese American farmworkers, organized as the Filipino Federated Workers Union, the American Agricultural Industrial Workers, and the Japanese Farm Workers Union of California. They were employed by Japanese American farmers who had no legal right to own their own land, which was held in the name of various banks (especially Bank of America) and leased to the resident alien farmers to get around the exclusion laws that prohibited Japanese American land ownership.

The "considerable violence" was mostly the work of the LAPD Red Squad, which "used brutal and violent tactics to punish strikers and their supporters". There was, however, an incident in Torrance on May 25, in which one young strikebreaker reported that he "was one of 25 men who had been brought to section from Chula Vista to replace striking celery workers" and had been "set upon by Mexicans and Filipinos".

In his 1939 book Factories in the Field: The Story of Migratory Farm Labor in California, journalist Carey McWilliams dubbed it "the backyard strike", because until this strike Angelenos had only heard about strike-related violence in distant parts of the vast state, whereas this strike took place in "vacant lots" in the southwestern section of Los Angeles County. Much of that violence occurred in the San Joaquin Valley during a series of agricultural strikes that took place in 1933.

The celery strike concluded with workers winning a modest wage increase and other concessions, in an agreement that was later renewed twice.

== See also ==
- 1933 El Monte berry strike
- Citrus Strike of 1936
- History of the Japanese in Los Angeles
- History of Mexican Americans in Los Angeles
- Strikes in the United States in the 1930s
- Celery mosaic virus
