= In Dubious Battle =

Novel centred on unionised labour, by John Steinbeck

- First edition
- Author: John Steinbeck
- Language: English
- Publisher: Covici-Friede
- Publication date: 1936
- Publication place: United States
- Media type: Print (hardback & paperback)
- Pages: 270
- Preceded by: Tortilla Flat
- Followed by: Of Mice and Men

In Dubious Battle is a novel by John Steinbeck, written in 1936.

The central figure of the story is an activist attempting to organize abused laborers in order to gain fair wages and working conditions. Despite its political themes, Steinbeck intended for the book to represent "man's eternal, bitter warfare with himself", instead of "ranting about justice and oppression".

== Background ==
The title is a reference to a passage from John Milton's Paradise Lost:

Innumerable force of Spirits armed,
That durst dislike his reign, and, me preferring,
His utmost power with adverse power opposed
In dubious battle on the plains of Heaven
And shook his throne. What though the field be lost?
All is not lost—the unconquerable will,
And study of revenge, immortal hate,
And courage never to submit or yield:
And what is else not to be overcome?

Prior to publication, Steinbeck wrote in a letter:

This is the first time I have felt that I could take the time to write and also that I had anything to say to anything except my manuscript book. You remember that I had an idea that I was going to write the autobiography of a Communist ... There lay the trouble. I had planned to write a journalistic account of a strike. But as I thought of it as fiction the thing got bigger and bigger. It couldn't be that. I've been living with this thing for some time now. I don't know how much I have got over, but I have used a small strike in an orchard valley as the symbol of man's eternal, bitter warfare with himself.

The novel likely recounts a fruit worker strike that occurred in Tulare County, California.

== Plot summary ==
In Dubious Battle deals with a fruit-workers' strike in a California valley and the attempts of labor unions to organize, lead, and provide for the striking pickers.

Jim Nolan meets Harry Nilson who initiates Jim's application process to become the newest member of the Communist Party. Mac "Doc" McLeod, the Party organizer, tells Jim they will go to the Torgas Valley (a composite location) in an attempt to rouse the two thousand fruit pickers against the Growers' Association, and to encourage the strike to spill over into the cotton fields in Tandale.

Momentum for strike action builds after old Dan breaks two rungs out of a ladder and falls. London becomes chairman of a committee of seven men, while Mac convinces Al Anderson's father to loan five acres as a base for the fruit pickers in exchange for them picking his crop for free. Doc Burton is hired by Mac to maintain the sanitation of the strikers' camp, so as to prevent it from being disbanded by the Red Cross.

The course of the strike is recounted in some detail, including the politics of the local growers, the support by Al through his little luncheonette, the "sweet-talking" of some locals in order to garner food and other help for the pickers, and personal crises and tragedies in individual cases. Mac emerges as a heroic but quite single-minded figure; Jim's occasional doubts are presented as well.

Jim joins Sam in a picket as they go after some 'scabs' in the apple orchard. Sam's pickets violently injure them. While out on the road Dakin, the leader of the pickers, is ambushed by a vigilante group at gunpoint. Later, the Anderson barn is burned down by vigilantes. In the aftermath, Jim is killed by a high powered shotgun. As the book ends, Mac is continuing to rouse and motivate the picketers, in spite of seemingly hopeless odds.

== Characters ==
- Doc Burton – A doctor who, despite his skepticism of leftist views, works in the strikers' camp, ensuring that it cannot be disbanded on the basis of a lack of sanitation.
- Jim Nolan– New member of the "Party," whose political development is one of the book's central themes. His father was a labor organizer himself, and was legendary as one who fought.
- London – the second, but more significant, elected leader of the striking workers
- Mrs. Meer – Jim's landlady
- Harry Nilson – Party official who initiates Jim's application process for the Party
- Roy Nolan – Jim's father (killed three years earlier)
- Mr. Webb – Manager at Tulman's Department Store, where Jim worked who denies knowing Jim when he hears he is a radical.
- May Nolan – Jim's older sister who mysteriously disappears at a young age
- Mac McLeod – Party organizer and Jim's mentor. He becomes the main driver of the plot after taking Jim under his wing.
- Dick Halsing – "pretty boy" party member in charge of soliciting Party sympathizers for donations
- Joy – a radical of the time. Had spent many years fighting for workers rights.
- Alfred Anderson – Owner/operator of Al's Lunch Wagon; son of a small apple farmer in the valley.
- Sam – "lean-face", a picker
- Lisa – London's daughter-in-law who is assisted by Mac when in labor
- Dan – an old picker whose fall from a rotten ladder initially causes the other workers to take strike action
- Dakin – leader of pickers at the Hunter place
- Alla – Dakin's wife
- Jerry – a picker at Hunter's who favors strike
- Al Anderson – Alfred's father, small farm owner, proud of his dogs
- Burke – Dakin's assistant
- Albert Johnson – truck owner
- Bolter – President of the Fruitgrower's Association

== Reception and legacy ==
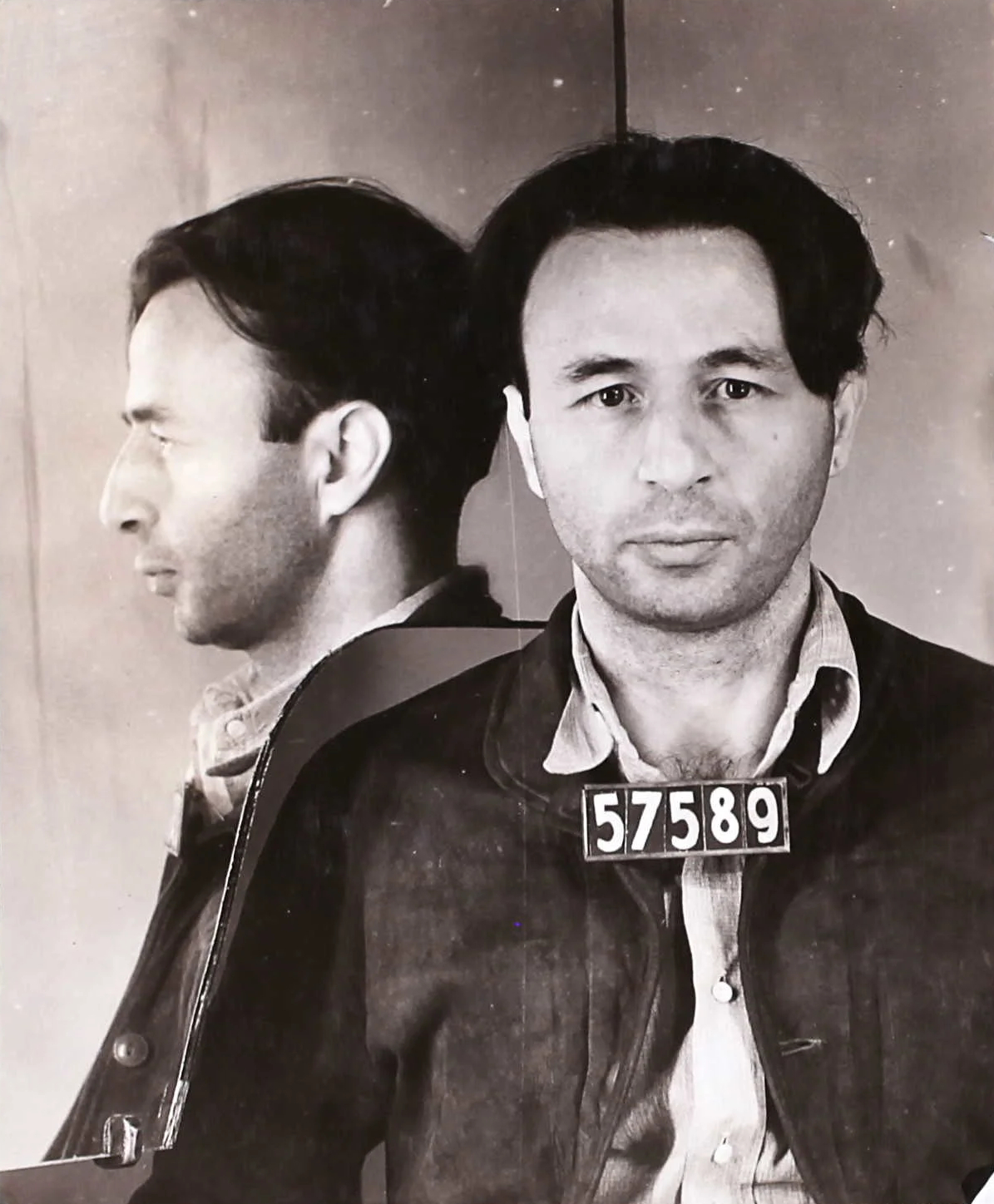
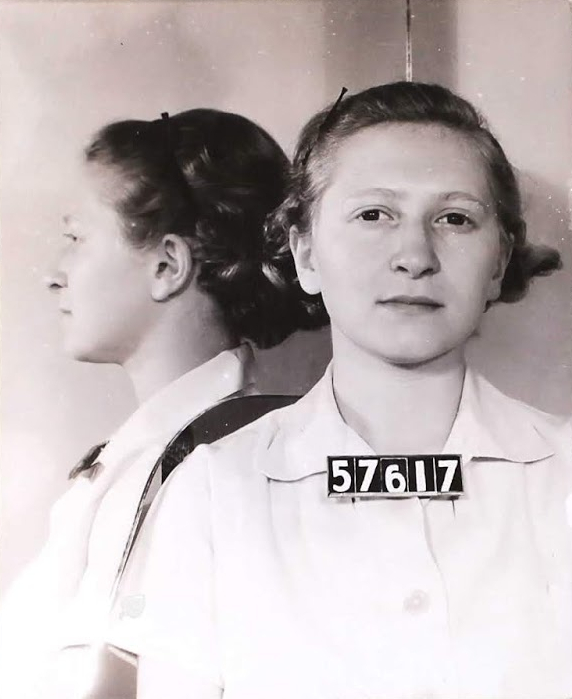
Patrick Chambers and Caroline Decker, Communist Party labor organizers who the characters of Mac and Jim are believed to be based on. Steinbeck drew on their firsthand accounts of the California agricultural strikes of 1933 when writing the book. They later objected to his characterization of the striking workers.

On publication, New York Times reviewer Fred T. March compared it to the "genial gusto" of the "picaresque" Tortilla Flat. He commented that "You would never know that In Dubious Battle was by the same John Steinbeck if the publishers did not tell you so." He called it "courageous and desperately honest," "the best labor and strike novel to come out of our contemporary economic and social unrest," and "such a novel as Sinclair Lewis at his best might have done had he gone on with his projected labor novel..."

In 1943, with Steinbeck now famous, Carlos Baker "revalued" the novel. He opened by saying "Among Steinbeck's best novels, the least known is probably In Dubious Battle." Steinbeck, he said, "is supremely interested in what happens to men's minds and hearts when they function, not as responsible, self-governing individuals, but as members of a group.... Biologists have a word for this very important problem; they call it bionomics, or ecology." He said that "Steinbeck's bionomic interest is visible in all that he has done, from Tortilla Flat, in the middle Thirties, through his semi-biological Sea of Cortez, to his latest communiqués as a war correspondent in England." He characterized In Dubious Battle as "an attempt to study a typical mid-depression strike in bionomic terms."

Michael Gold of Marxist magazine New Masses praised the novel, calling Steinbeck a "bearer of a 'true people's culture'". Critics Edmund C. Richards and Granville Hicks, journalist Claud E. Jones, and Communist Party newspaper Daily Worker praised it as a "proletarian novel". Scholar Peter W. Yancey, however, argued that In Dubious Battle did not constitute a proletarian or radical novel, because Steinbeck did not aim to gloss over the shortcomings of union organizers or workers.

In 1958, critic Alfred Kazin referred to In Dubious Battle and The Grapes of Wrath as "his most powerful books," contrasting them with Cannery Row and The Wayward Bus. President Barack Obama told the New York Times that it was his favorite book by Steinbeck.

== Film adaptation ==
On January 30, 2015, it was announced that James Franco would direct and star in a film version of the novel. The screenplay was written by Matt Rager and will be produced by AMBI Productions, Rabbit Bandini Productions, and That's Hollywood Productions. The film stars Nat Wolff in the lead role, along with Josh Hutcherson, Bryan Cranston, Robert Duvall, Ed Harris, Selena Gomez, and others. Principal photography began on March 19, 2015 in Atlanta and Bostwick, Georgia. Additional footage was shot in orchards West of Yakima, Washington September 27 and 28, 2015. The film was released in theaters in the United States on February 17, 2017.

== See also ==
- California agricultural strikes of 1933
