= Citrus Strike of 1936 =

Labor strike in Orange County, California in June 1936

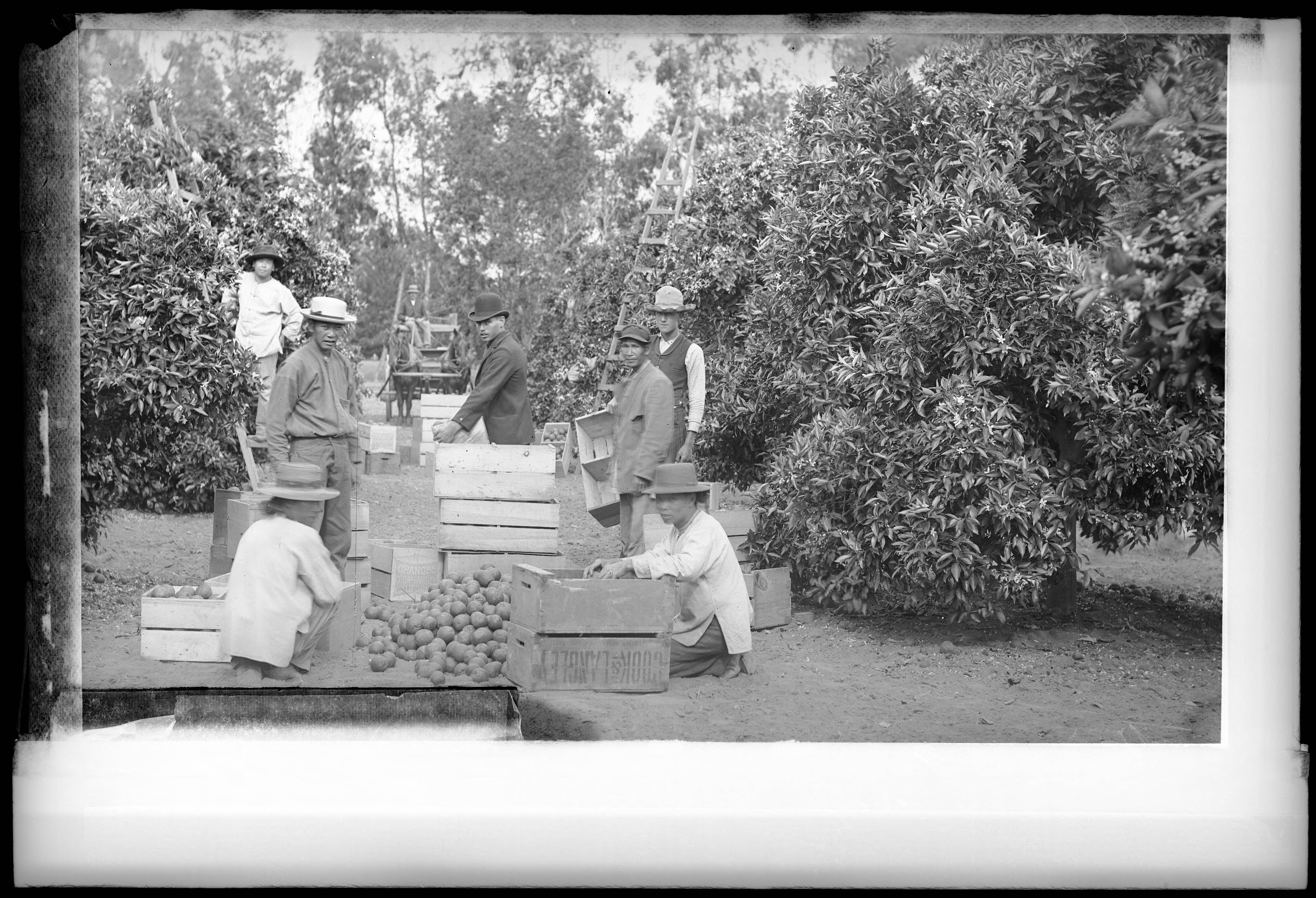
Orange fruit pickers, Santa Ana, Orange County, California, c. 1900 (California Historical Society collection at USC Libraries, CHS-154)

The Citrus Strike of 1936 was the largest strike to affect the Citrus industry in southern California among citrus workers for better working conditions that took place within the Citrus belt covering more than 280,000 acres covering various cities within Orange County, such as Fullerton and Anaheim from June 10 to July 25. Multiple factors led the citrus workers to strike including low paid wages, harsh working conditions, inadequate living conditions, and overall social dynamics. The strike itself was significant for ending the myth of "contented Mexican labor." It was one of the most violently suppressed strikes of the early twentieth century in the United States. The sheriff who suppressed the largely Mexican 3,000 citrus pickers was himself a citrus rancher who issued a "shoot to kill" order on the strikers. The aftermath of the strike effort led to 400 citrus workers being arrested in total, while others were forced to either face jail time or possible deportation back to Mexico. It has also been referred to as the Citrus War and the Citrus Riots.

== Citrus picker living conditions ==
The citrus belt stretched from San Diego to Ventura counties, where growers had established dozens of small communities with populations ranging from 200 to 1,000. The living conditions in these communities for Mexican workers were characterized by small, often substandard structures made of materials like wood, adobe, or hollow brick; the majority of these structures lacked basic amenities. One of these settlements, known as "Tiajuanita" in Fullerton, was constructed from materials such as scrap sheet iron, discarded fence posts, and signboards. The living conditions in Tiajuanita were challenging, with only one water faucet and a few makeshift bathrooms serving the entire settlement. The majority of these communities were referred to as "colonial" or camps, which were isolated from one another. Local governments actively "maintained segregated schools, theaters, restaurants, parks, and of course residences". Housing segregation was part of the broader discriminatory practices and unequal treatment faced by Mexican laborers in the region.

The physical separations between the communities fostered a divide between immigrant workers and the “dominant English-speaking townspeople”. Camps featured segregated schooling built with the goal of Americanizing the citrus pickers' children while focusing on vocational skills that translate to the orange groves and assimilation into American culture, illustrating the desire to eradicate Mexican culture. The dominant Anglo-American community, such as civic groups, media, and school boards, joined in the support of the growers and created separations between the townspeople and pickers.

Citrus workers additionally faced forced repatriation or deportation as tensions grew between races. U.S. immigration authorities intervened to assist the growers and began investigating the strikers' legal status. Authorities threatened the “deportation of undocumented workers”. While the pickers feared forced deportations by the United States, the Mexican government via its Consulates was concerned with political implications of repatriation (the return of workers to Mexico).

== The strikes ==
Pickers earned an average of only $423 annually and many of the workers compared their conditions to slavery. Prior to the strike, wages dropped from $4 a day to $3 for extremely back-breaking labor. Orange pickers could be identified by "his single drooping shoulder, deeply scarred from the strap of the bag he was required to fill with fifty pounds of oranges while perched on a precarious ladder." Men worked as pickers while women worked in packing houses. The growers persuaded the Orange County Board of Supervisors to outlaw any form of picketing or protest in Orange County.

In 1928, union activity began to form with the Confederación de Uniones Obreras Mexicanas (CUOM), formed with the active participation of the Mexican Consulate. The CUOM aimed to work within U.S. laws, separated itself from radical agitators, and aligned closely with the Mexican government-controlled union CROM.

The Confederación de Uniones de Campesinos y Obreros Mexicanos (CUCOM) was an organization consisting of various Mexican farmers. The first strike organized by CUCOM took place in 1933 under the leadership of William Velarde. CUCOM led strikes in Orange County and in March 1935, such as the walkout at the Villa Park, presented demands to orange growers, including higher wages, free transportation, abolition of a bonus system, and the right to form a union.

Mexican consular officials played a moderating but ultimately divisive role. Lucas Lucio, the consular representative, intervened to curb worker militancy by denouncing “outside agitators” and advising against immediate strikes, while Consul Ricardo Hill addressed mass meetings urging workers to postpone action and instead pursue legal negotiations in the following season; despite this conservative approach, growers still condemned all union activity as communist-inspired, highlighting the deep suspicion and hostility that surrounded Mexican worker organizing in the citrus industry.

On June 11, 2,500 men and women workers left the orange groves of The Pressel Orchard, where the strike began. Local media attempted to downplay the strike, portraying it initially as a farce. By early July, law enforcement was stopping anyone who "looked Mexican" and was near the orange groves. Immigation autories threatened Deportation and growers engaged in "espionage". In some cases, strikers were severely beaten, with their injuries being disregarded in court as "sympathy propaganda." On July 6, the Sheriff issues "shoot to kill orders and Strikers were intentionally characterized as "communists" who were engaging in a "little Mexican revolution" to stoke fears in the Orange County population.

Women in the labor community organized the Cuerpo Auxiliar de Mujeres (the Union Women's Auxiliary) to prevent growers from hiring scabs. The strike ended on July 25 with workers gaining a "20-cent-an-hour wage for a nine-hour day plus three cents for each box picked over 30", despite the growers refusing to recognize the union's right to collective bargaining.

== Grower response ==
The citrus growers responded with fliers and support from conservative newspapers. Orange County's newspapers downplayed the strike, claiming that labor conditions were already amicable and that the demands were made by labor agitators and not valid.

Inexperienced high school and college boys were also enlisted to replace the Naranjeros (Citrus pickers). The growers' association released statements praising the replacement workers and their ability to do just as well as the citrus pickers.

Orange County Sheriff Logan Jackson deputized orchard guards, equipping them with weapons and the authority to make arrests. By the end of the strike, over 250 arrests were made. Outside of arrests, the authorities turned to federal immigration authorities, tear gas, and physical attacks on citrus farmers and their supporters. At the height of the labor strikes, Sheriff Jackson formally issued a "shoot to kill" order claiming this was a battle between the entire county and communist citrus pickers.

Associated Farmers organized groups of vigilantes to attack those striking, who used physical violence while law enforcement simply observed.

== Consulate involvement ==
During the strike, the Mexican consulate intervened heavily in labor organizing but rather than simply supporting the workers, the consulated shaped union polices along "conservative and nationalistic line".

In mid-July, the Mexican Consulate pushed the radical leaders aside and brought in a special negotiator from the Mexican government, Adolfo de la Huerta, to take control of the settlement process. When radical leader William Velarde urged workers to reject what he viewed as a “sell-out” agreement, the Sheriff issued a warrant for his arrest, forcing him into hiding and clearing the way for the consulate to finalize a deal and bring the strike to an end.

== Aftermath ==
The strike ended on July 27 with a modest victory for the workers, securing a pay increase and the elimination of transportation charges, but growers refused to recognize the union and retained the upper hand through a non-binding arbitration clause that favored their interests. As part of the settlement, the Mexican Consulate assured growers they would “clean out” radical elements from the union, leading to a purge of militant leaders and weakening the organization from within.

A direct outcome of the 1936 strike is that the Citrus Association evicted fifty families from the Camp Colorado housing. The strike marked a turning point when the growers' "paternalism crumbled". Prior to the strike the association had touted the camp as a "model of Americanization" providing English classes focused on housework and encouraged families to be model citizens and workers".

Over the following years, the union's strength steadily declined, and CUCOM leadership ultimately voted to stop cooperating with the consulate. Historians view this outcome as a turning point: the 1936 citrus strike effectively ended the Mexican Consulate's dominance in California labor disputes and pushed future organizing efforts toward integration with U.S. national unions such as the AFL and CIO. In retrospect, the consulate's intervention, shaped by Mexican domestic politics and its fear of radicalism, hindered unionization in the short term but permanently altered the trajectory of labor and political history in the region.

In 1939, a congressional investigation found that the growers had illegally blacklisted people and used violent tactics to crush the strike. However, no charges were filed. Carey McWilliams referenced the strikes in a chapter of his nationally released book Factories in the Field (1939), stating that "No one who has visited a rural county in California under these circumstances will deny the reality of the terror that exists. It is no exaggeration to describe this state of affairs as fascism in practice."

Following the strike, the association moved away from the family-based labor system that had characterized Campo Colorado. It began hiring "braceros," also known as Mexican contract laborers who were ineligible for citizenship, to work the fields.

The strike has been noted as largely forgotten, such as in a 1971 dissertation on the subject, and in a 1975 article for the Los Angeles Times, which referred to it as "one of the least-chronicled incidents in the history of the citrus belt." According to Gustavo Arellano, the event continues to be left out of historical chronicles of Orange County history.

The strike has been credited with ending the myth that Mexican laborers were content with poor working conditions at the time, a myth heavily promoted by the Anglo agricultural industry, and with inspiring conservative hostility toward labor organization in Orange County and elsewhere.

== See also ==
- Cantaloupe strike of 1928
- California agricultural strikes of 1933
