= 1934 United States Senate election in California =

- November 5, 1934
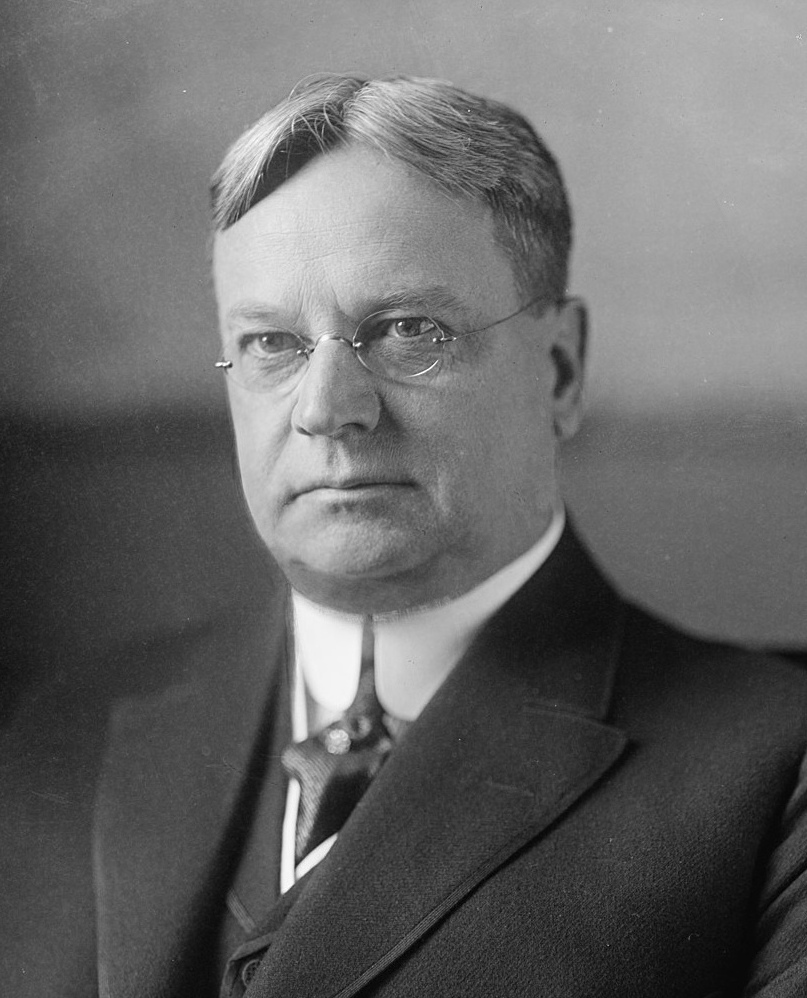

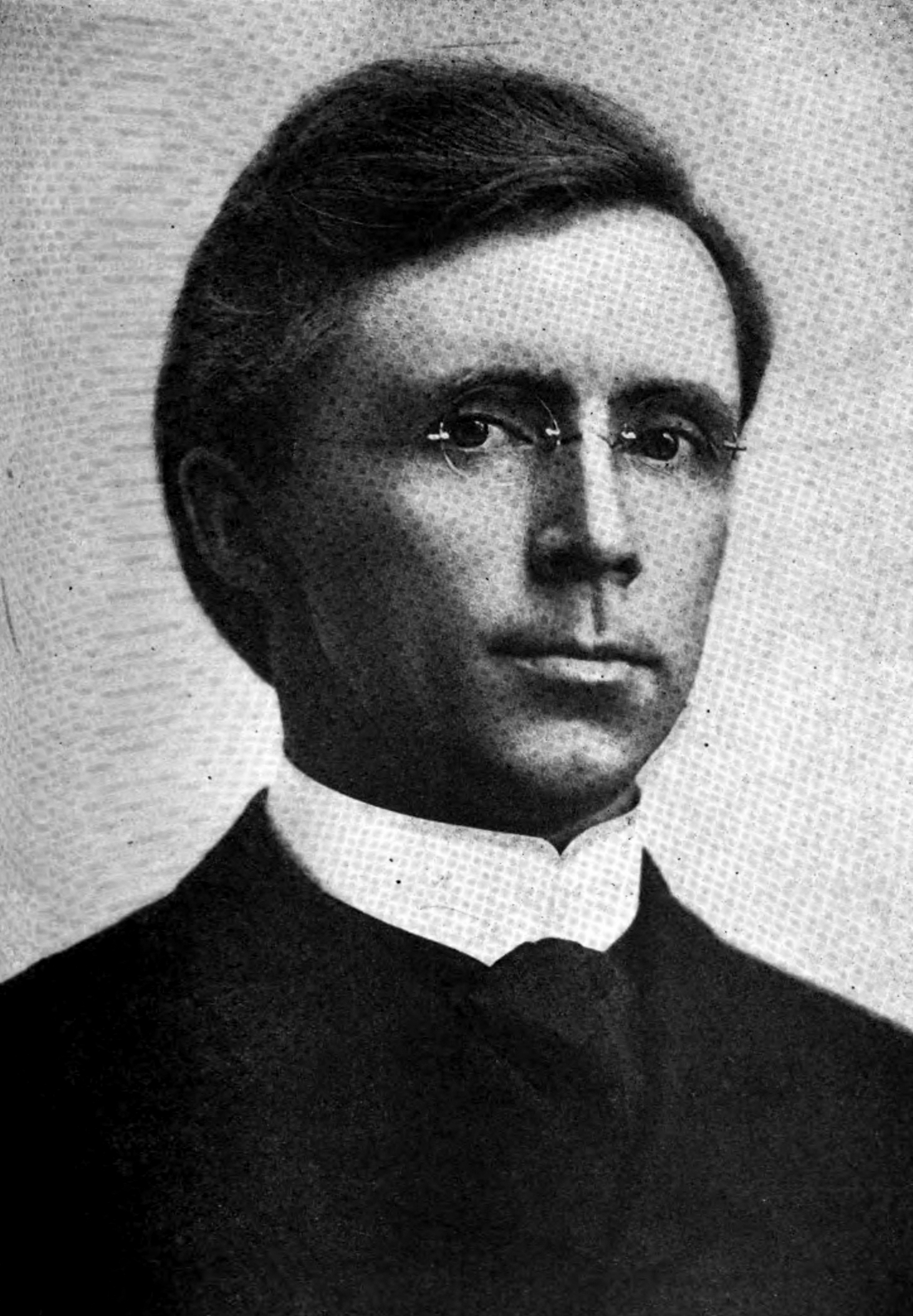
Nominee	Hiram Johnson	George Ross Kirkpatrick
Party	Republican	Socialist
Alliance	Democratic
Popular vote	1,946,572	108,748
Percentage	94.66%	5.29%
- County results Johnson: 90–100%
U.S. senator before election
Hiram Johnson
Republican
Elected U.S. Senator
Hiram Johnson
Republican

The 1934 United States Senate election in California was held on November 6, 1934. Incumbent Republican Senator Hiram Johnson was re-elected to his fourth term in office.

By cross-filing and winning the Democratic primary, Johnson eliminated his strongest competition and handily won the general election with opposition only from the Socialist Party.

== Republican primary ==
=== Candidates ===
- Hiram Johnson, incumbent Senator
- Richmond A. Rust

=== Results ===
Primary election results
Party	Candidate	Votes	%
Republican	Hiram Johnson (incumbent)	526,899	71.06%
Democratic	Richmond A. Rust	214,638	28.95%
Total votes		741,537	100.00%

== Democratic primary ==
=== Candidates ===
- Clarence A. Henning, candidate for U.S. Representative in 1924
- Carl A. Johnson, nominee for California's 7th congressional district in 1902
- Hiram Johnson, incumbent Senator (cross-filing)

=== Results ===
Primary election results
Party	Candidate	Votes	%
Republican	Hiram Johnson (incumbent)	655,648	87.33%
Democratic	Clarence A. Henning	50,075	6.67%
Democratic	Carl A. Johnson	45,077	6.00%
Total votes		750,800	100.00%

== Third parties and independents ==
=== Independent ===
A write-in bid was launched in support of Communist Pat Chambers.

=== Socialist ===
- George Ross Kirkpatrick, nominee for vice president in 1916

== Results ==
1934 United States Senate election in California
Party	Candidate	Votes	%	±%
Republican	Hiram Johnson (incumbent)	1,946,572	94.66%	▲22.55
Socialist	George Ross Kirkpatrick	108,748	5.29%	▲3.57
Independent	Pat Chambers (write-in)	1,025	0.05%	N/A
Total votes		2,056,345	100.00%	

=== Results By County ===
County	Hiram Johnson Republican		George Ross Kirkpatrick Socialist		Pat Chambers Independent		Total Votes Cast
County	#	%	#	%	#	%	Total Votes Cast
Alameda	163,649	93.66%	11,077	6.34%	0	0.00%	174,726
Alpine	160	98.77%	2	1.23%	0	0.00%	162
Amador	3,166	95.94%	134	4.06%	0	0.00%	3,300
Butte	14,174	94.73%	789	5.27%	0	0.00%	14,963
Calaveras	2,783	95.08%	144	4.92%	0	0.00%	2,927
Colusa	3,921	96.67%	135	3.33%	0	0.00%	4,056
Contra Costa	29,609	94.59%	1,694	5.41%	0	0.00%	31,303
Del Norte	2,004	94.93%	107	5.07%	0	0.00%	2,111
El Dorado	4,456	93.83%	293	6.17%	0	0.00%	4,749
Fresno	43,981	95.49%	2,079	4.51%	0	0.00%	46,060
Glenn	4,247	94.99%	224	5.01%	0	0.00%	4,471
Humboldt	15,351	95.23%	769	4.77%	0	0.00%	16,120
Imperial	12,016	96.14%	483	3.86%	0	0.00%	12,499
Inyo	2,197	94.05%	139	5.95%	0	0.00%	2,336
Kern	26,035	95.74%	1,159	4.26%	0	0.00%	27,194
Kings	7,379	94.80%	405	5.20%	0	0.00%	7,784
Lake	3,483	95.09%	180	4.91%	0	0.00%	3,663
Lassen	4,548	95.43%	218	4.57%	0	0.00%	4,766
Los Angeles	803,707	95.04%	41,323	4.89%	579	0.07%	845,609
Madera	5,570	95.57%	251	4.31%	7	0.12%	5,828
Marin	14,928	93.00%	1,123	7.00%	0	0.00%	16,051
Mariposa	1,921	94.63%	109	5.37%	0	0.00%	2,030
Mendocino	7,929	93.85%	520	6.15%	0	0.00%	8,449
Merced	9,880	95.53%	462	4.47%	0	0.00%	10,342
Modoc	2,492	95.30%	123	4.70%	0	0.00%	2,615
Mono	693	95.32%	34	4.68%	0	0.00%	727
Monterey	15,458	95.74%	687	4.26%	0	0.00%	16,145
Napa	8,232	96.21%	324	3.79%	0	0.00%	8,556
Nevada	5,483	92.31%	457	7.69%	0	0.00%	5,940
Orange	42,715	95.51%	2,009	4.49%	0	0.00%	44,724
Placer	8,394	94.75%	465	5.25%	0	0.00%	8,859
Plumas	2,874	95.13%	147	4.87%	0	0.00%	3,021
Riverside	26,425	95.50%	1,245	4.50%	0	0.00%	27,670
Sacramento	48,172	95.99%	1,960	3.91%	55	0.11%	50,187
San Benito	3,535	94.80%	194	5.20%	0	0.00%	3,729
San Bernardino	44,284	94.96%	2,349	5.04%	0	0.00%	46,633
San Diego	76,407	94.70%	4,263	5.28%	10	0.01%	80,680
San Francisco	174,569	92.39%	14,034	7.43%	349	0.18%	188,952
San Joaquin	34,238	96.00%	1,404	3.94%	21	0.06%	35,663
San Luis Obispo	11,396	95.28%	565	4.72%	0	0.00%	11,961
San Mateo	28,792	93.45%	2,018	6.55%	0	0.00%	30,810
Santa Barbara	20,340	96.05%	837	3.95%	0	0.00%	21,177
Santa Cruz	14,584	94.63%	827	5.37%	0	0.00%	15,411
Santa Clara	50,263	92.88%	3,852	7.12%	0	0.00%	54,115
Shasta	6,435	93.52%	446	6.48%	0	0.00%	6,881
Sierra	1,224	91.82%	108	8.10%	1	0.08%	1,333
Siskiyou	9,020	93.71%	605	6.29%	0	0.00%	9,625
Solano	13,527	96.78%	450	3.22%	0	0.00%	13,977
Sonoma	22,444	94.36%	1,342	5.64%	0	0.00%	23,786
Stanislaus	19,813	95.21%	994	4.78%	2	0.01%	20,809
Sutter	5,208	94.93%	223	5.07%	0	0.00%	5,431
Tehama	5,477	95.05%	285	4.95%	0	0.00%	5,762
Trinity	1,787	91.64%	163	8.36%	0	0.00%	1,950
Tulare	22,226	95.57%	1,031	4.43%	0	0.00%	23,257
Tuolumne	3,556	94.50%	207	5.50%	0	0.00%	3,763
Ventura	17,260	95.72%	771	4.28%	0	0.00%	18,031
Yolo	7,680	96.58%	271	3.41%	1	0.01%	7,952
Yuba	4,475	94.93%	239	5.07%	0	0.00%	4,714
Total	1,946,572	94.66%	108,748	5.29%	1,025	0.05%	2,056,345

== See also ==
- 1934 United States Senate elections
