= Caroline Decker =

American labor activist

Caroline Decker Gladstein
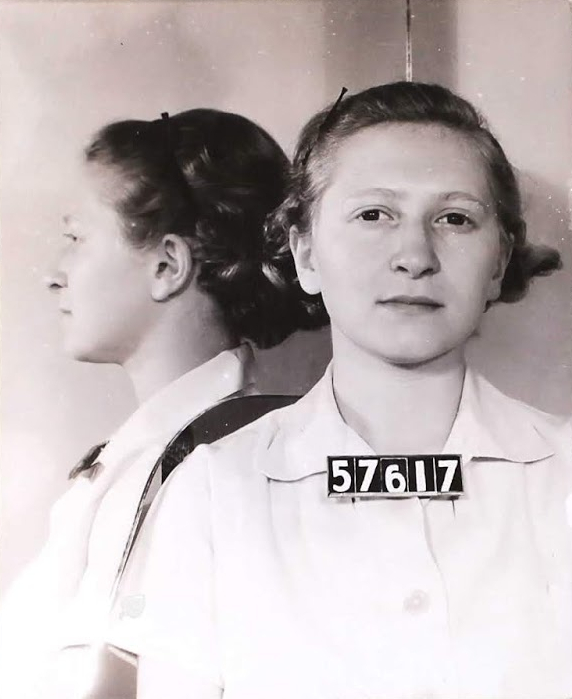
- Decker's San Quentin mugshot, 1935
- Born: April 26, 1912; Macon, Georgia, U.S.
- Died: May 17, 1992 (aged 80); Marin, California, U.S.
- Other names: Caroline Decker; Caroline Dwofsky
- Organization(s): Cannery and Agricultural Workers’ International Union
- Known for: Labor activism

Caroline Decker Gladstein (born Caroline Dwofsky, April 26, 1912 – May 17, 1992) was a labor activist in the 1930s in California. A member of the Communist Party, as many activists were, she was an organizer for the Cannery and Agricultural Workers’ International Union (CAWIU). Decker helped organize the massive California agricultural strikes of 1933 during the Great Depression.

== Background ==
Caroline Decker was born on April 26, 1912, in Macon, Georgia. She was born Caroline Dwofsky, the daughter of Bernard Dwofsky and Anna Raskin. Like most communist organizers at the time, Caroline used an alias, taking "Decker" as hers, and known as Caroline Decker throughout her organizing career. Her parents were Jewish immigrants that emigrated to the U.S. after fleeing pogroms in Ukraine.

Her family moved to Syracuse when she was 12, and her father Bernard is buried there in the Workman's Circle Cemetery. In Syracuse, Caroline met many leaders of left-wing organizations who frequented the family home. Influenced by her brother, who was a student at Columbia University in New York City, and her sister, who was a national officer of the left-wing Workers International Relief Organization, Decker became involved with radical politics and trade union organizing in her early teens. She joined the Young Communist League USA, helped organize cigar workers and shoe workers in Binghamton and became a speaker at such events as International Women's Day.

== Union activism ==
Decker's first foray in union activism took place during the Harlan County War, the violent confrontation between miners and mine owners in Harlan County, Kentucky, in 1931–1932 during the Great Depression. She and her sister worked out of Knoxville, Tennessee, helping with strike relief and organization.

After the strike ended, Decker went west to California as part of the Free Tom Mooney delegation. She stopped in Carmel at the home of Lincoln Steffans, where Langston Hughes and Ellen Winter celebrated the victory by writing a pageant. They intended it to be "…a tribute to Caroline Decker" but it was unsuccessful, a "…long, artificial propaganda vehicle too complicated and too cumbersome to be performed."

== California Agricultural Strike 1933 ==
California, in 1933, was in the midst of bitter labor struggles from the Central Valleys south to Imperial County, California; it was one of the most militant years in agricultural worker activism. Declining agricultural wages put pressure on workers, and the Cannery and Agricultural Worker's International Union (CAWIU) organizers found fertile ground among discontented and struggling farm workers. Several of the CAWIU leaders, including Decker, were members of the Communist Party, and she became the union secretary. A series of strikes in 1933 against growers of cherries, pears, peaches, and sugar beets had mixed success, but by August "[s]trikes led or influenced by the union resulted in wage increases of as much as 100 percent for thousands of agricultural workers. Wages for agricultural workers prior to the August strikes had ranged from 15 to 17-1/2 cents an hour, but by the end of the month "…was firmly fixed at 25 cents" throughout most of the state."

Decker moved further up the ranks of the CAWI during the strike against grape growers in the Fresno area. Decker led a rally in Fresno on September 11 where “…four thousand thronged the speaker’s platform to hear this petite blonde, barely twenty-one”. One CAWIU organizer, Patrick Chaffee, remembers her "…fiery eloquence", and within a month, "Comrade Decker had led six thousand off the job, the largest single agricultural strike to that point in the history of California". Grape pickers sought a wage of 25 cents an hour, but growers held firm at 20 cents. Local authorities arrested much of the leadership of the CAWIU, and forcibly broke up picket lines. The editor of the Fresno Bee believed the CAWIU was plotting the overthrow of the U.S. government and encouraged the actions of authorities.

In October 1933, Decker became involved with the San Joaquin cotton strike. Cotton was the "second most lucrative crop in California". In 1921, there were 1,500 acres in production; by 1937 there “was close to 600,00 acres”. The Great Depression had sharply reduced the prices that cotton growers got for their product, and they passed those declines on to workers in the form of lower wages, with wages declining nearly 75 percent in three years. By the time of the strike, growers had sold 75 per cent of the crop to Japan at 7 cents a pound in advance of the harvest, and had no room whatsoever to pass on added labor costs. Field workers demanded one dollar per hundred pounds; growers offered sixty cents, at which rate "even a strong, steadily working man could make no more than $1.20 a day. An entire family working all day would average $2."

The strike began on October 4, with twelve thousand workers walking off the job and a strike front extending for five hundred miles. Growers evicted families of strikers from company-owned housing, and in Pixley, California, a violent clash between strikers and growers left "two Mexican strikers … dead [and] eight others…wounded. An estimated 5,000 people gathered for the funeral mass for the two murdered strikers—Delfino Davila and Dolores Hernandez. Governor James Rolph appointed a fact-finding committee to look into the violence."

Decker led strikers to the courthouse in Visalia where, on October 19, 1933, the committee began its hearings. She questioned strikers on the stand, where she brought out the details of their lives: "a work day extending from daylight to dark, their fingers bleeding from the prickly cotton bolls, the children working alongside their parents until they collapsed on the ground in exhausted sleep". After hearing testimony from another woman who said her children "had not worn shoes since 1930" the growers' counsel charged that Decker had coached witness testimony. She "immediately offered to let him personally select all further strikers' witnesses" but he declined the offer. Despite the drama of the testimony, the action of the government through NRA regional director George Creel ultimately ended the strike. Creel brought in relief supplies for striking workers, and got the Federal Intermediate Credit Bank to help finance the cotton growers so they could give a wage of 75 cents an hour. Creel's goals were to persuade growers and strikers to accept that rate, and to deny National Labor Board recognition to the CAWIU because of its communist leadership. Eventually the Central Strike Committee agreed to the terms and workers returned to work without an officially recognized union.

== Arrest and trial ==
In June 1934, Decker traveled to Contra Costa County to organize apricot pickers, working alongside members of the AFL-affiliated Cannery Workers Union. Growers objected to Decker's presence because of her communist membership, and she was maneuvered off the team. Meanwhile, a group was formed representing growers and funded by railroads, utilities, banks, and others who hoped to defeat agricultural unionism: the Associated Farmers of California. They hired private investigators and even infiltrated the Communist Party in order to learn more about the CAWIU leadership.

On July 20, the police, acting on information from the Associated Farmers, rounded up seventeen of the union's leaders, including Decker, and charged them with "criminal syndicalism, a felony". When the trial finally went to the jury, after a six-hour defense summary by Decker, it had become the longest trial in California history, at four and a half months. Decker was found guilty on two of six counts and sentenced to a term of imprisonment at Tehachapi. She served for three years and was released in 1937. The Third District Court of Appeals eventually overturned the verdict and voided the convictions.

== Later years ==
The Communist Party, meanwhile, decided to concentrate on anti-fascism, and the CAWIU was effectively dissolved as an independent union. The events in Europe and around the world, as World War II loomed, took precedence over labor organizing.

Decker divorced her first husband, Jack Warnick, shortly after her release from prison. She had served time for violating California's Criminal Syndicalism laws.

She married attorney Richard Gladstein. They had four children together. Decker Gladstein died in Marin County, California, on May 17, 1992.
