= Cannery and Agricultural Workers' Industrial Union =

US Communist-aligned union

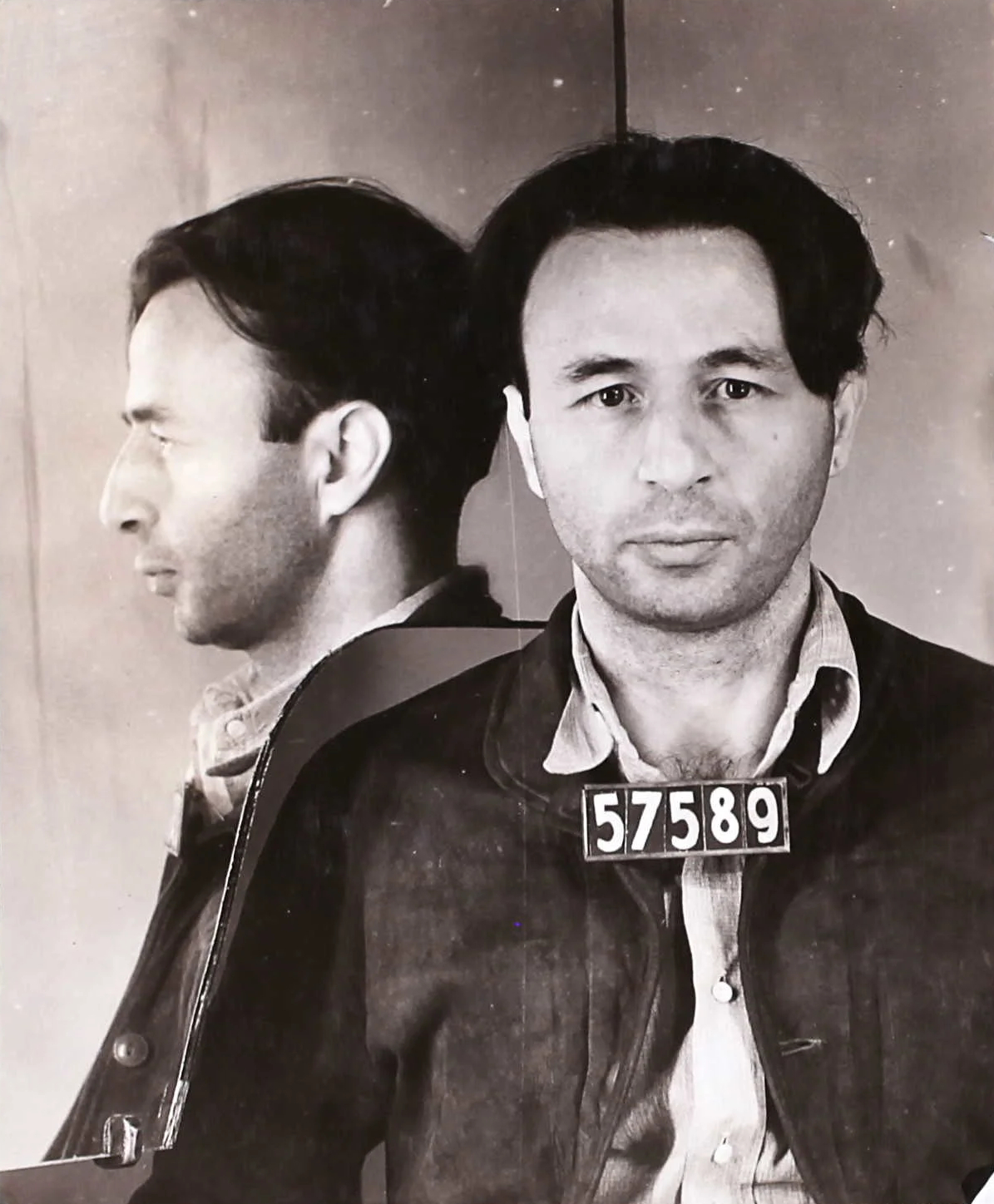
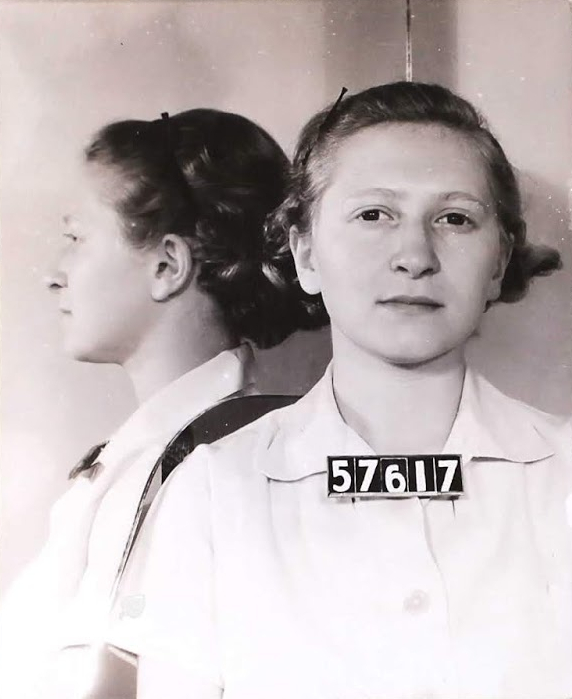
Patrick Chambers and Caroline Decker, CAWIU organizers and members of the Communist Party, who were arrested and charged under the California Criminal Syndicalism Act for their role in the California agricultural strikes of 1933. The characters of Mac and Jim in In Dubious Battle are believed to be based on them.

The Cannery and Agricultural Workers Industrial Union (CAWIU) was a Communist-aligned union active in California in the early 1930s. Organizers provided support to workers in California's fields and canning industry. The Cannery and Agricultural Workers Industrial Union (CAWIU) dated back to 1929 with the formation of the Trade Union Unity League (TUUL). With industrialization and the advent of the factories, labor started migrating into the urban space. An influx of immigrant workers contributed to the environment favorable to big business by increasing the supply of unskilled labor lost to the urban factories. The demand for labor spurred the growers to look to seasonal migrant workers as a viable labor source. Corporations began to look at profits and started to marginalize its workers by providing sub-par wages and working conditions to their seasonal workers. The formation of the Cannery and Agricultural Workers Industrial Union addressed and represented the civil rights of the migrant workers. Ultimately the CAWIU lost the battle, overwhelmed by the combined alliance of growers and the Mexican and state governments. The eventual abandonment of the Trade Union Unity League led to the dissolution of the CAWIU, which later emerged as the United Cannery, Agricultural, Packing, and Allied Workers of America (UCAPAWA).

== Background ==
The CAWIU faced many hurdles in its attempt to unionize. Since it was viewed as an independent union, it was generally left out of the wider trade union movement. The union's lack of representation in urban settings also cut it off from other sources of support and assistance. The first Hispanic labor activism in the Imperial Valley stemmed from the dreadful experience of the farm laborers. In 1927, Paul Taylor, a noted economist visited the Imperial Valley and reported on the conditions. He found about "20,000 Mexican immigrants working in the fields and that about half of them had been born in the United States. Working 9 to 10 hours a day in the spring and fall, and suffering in temperatures over 110 degrees in the summer, the seasonal workers suffered from low wages and an abusive system of labor contractors." Attempts to organize the migrant workers by the CAWIU by means of strikes and protests, were quashed through violence by local authorities and the Associated Farmers. Other factors led to the failure of the CAWIU. The diversity of races among the farm laborers, the migratory character of employment, and the varying seasonal requirements for various crops prevented the group from properly organizing and building the momentum needed for recognition. McWilliams described the prejudice that existed between urban and rural labor as a major obstacle to unionizing. Within the labor movement, urban factory labor was viewed more favorably than its rural counterpart. McWilliams states, "In order to achieve its ultimate objectives, organized farm labor must demolish this distinction... Standing in the path of the organization of farm labor is the unrealistic and inaccurate division of industry into urban and rural categories."

== History ==
In May 1928 the union sent out letters to all the growers asking for wage increases. They also requested an improvement in working conditions: ice for drinking water, picking sacks, lumber to build out-houses and legal compensation to injured workers. The strike leaders were arrested and sent to prison for violations of the state Criminal Syndicalism Law. The growers responded by employing vigilante strikebreakers, the Associated Farmers, which used threats and terror against the workers to prevent them from unionizing.

=== Farmworkers strikes of 1933 ===
Starting in April with the Santa Clara pea harvest, strikes erupted throughout the summer and fall of 1933 as each crop ripened for harvest. The strike wave culminated with the San Joaquin Valley Cotton Strike, the largest strike in the history of American agriculture. More than 47,500 farmworkers participated in the 1933 strikes. Twenty-four of these strikes, involving approximately 37,500 workers, were under the leadership of the Cannery and Agricultural Workers Industrial Union (CAWIU). Two strikers were shot and killed in Pixley during the October Cotton Strike. On October 10, a caravan of forty armed growers fired on a large group of unarmed strikers and their families who were gathered in the center of town to protest the arrests of strike leaders. The growers killed two and wounded at least eight more strikers while a group of highway patrolmen watched from a safe distance, refusing to intervene.

=== Farm workers' strike of 1934 ===
In 1934 the Cannery and Agricultural Workers Industrial Union called for a general strike of lettuce and vegetable workers. Workers demanded a thirty-five-cent increases in wages, a minimum five-hour work day, clean water, free transportation to and from work, and union recognition. Again, the authorities reacted with mass arrests and prohibitions against meetings. People were arrested on suspicion of supporting the strike. The violence and abuse of civil liberties continued until the federal government became involved to try to mediate a peace. Ultimately the CAWIU lost the battle, overwhelmed by the combined alliance of growers and the Mexican and state governments. The eventual abandonment of the Trade Union Unity League, or TUUL, meant the dissolution of the CAWIU, which later became the United Cannery, Agricultural, Packing and Allied Workers of America (UCAPAWA).

== See also ==
- California agricultural strikes of 1933
- Salinas Lettuce strike of 1934

== Sources ==
- Acuña, Rodolfo (2007). Corridors of Migration: The Odyssey of Mexican Laborers, 1600-1933. Tucson: University of Arizona Press. ISBN 9780816526369.
