= Pixley, California =

- census-designated place
- Location in Tulare County and the state of California

- Location in the United States
- Coordinates: 35°58′13″N 119°17′27″W
- Country: United States
- State: California
- County: Tulare
- Named for: Frank M. Pixley

Area
  - Total: 5.272 sq mi (13.654 km^{2})
  - Land: 5.250 sq mi (13.597 km^{2})
  - Water: 0.022 sq mi (0.057 km^{2}) 0.42%
- Elevation: 272 ft (83 m)

Population (2020)
  - Total: 3,828
  - Density: 729.2/sq mi (281.5/km^{2})
- Time zone: UTC-8 (Pacific (PST))
  - Summer (DST): UTC-7 (PDT)
- ZIP code: 93256
- Area code: 559
- FIPS code: 06-57512
- GNIS ID: 1652777

Pixley is a census-designated place (CDP) in Tulare County, California, United States. The population was 3,828 at the 2020 census, up from 3,310 at the 2010 census.

== History ==
The town began as a real-estate-speculation in 1884. The investors Darwin C. Allen, and William B. Bradbury knew their project would succeed only if the town was connected to the mainline of the Southern Pacific. They contacted Frank M. Pixley; a man whom they knew was a friend of Leland Stanford. In 1886, Pixley joined with the original investors as a partner in the Pixley Townsite Company. The company purchased additional land in the vicinity. When The Southern Pacific extended its tracks to the Townsite, the town prospered. The terms of sale for the land was 25% down, the rest to be carried back for three years by the owners at 8 percent interest. The partners made a handsome profit. Special railroad fares were offered to people in other areas of California and as far away as Boston in order to bring potential customers to see the new lands and the investment possibilities near Pixley. The first house built in Pixley was for Emma, William Pixley's widow, the late brother of Frank Pixley. Her three sons and daughter lived in the home. Emma bought a quarter section of an adjoining piece of land where she farmed until they moved back to San Francisco. Frank Pixley advertised the town named after him in his biweekly journal The Argonaut.

In the early 1890s, Chris Evans and John Sontag robbed a Southern Pacific Railroad train at Pixley.

In 1933, Pixley was one of the towns in California involved in the San Joaquin cotton strike, a labor action by agricultural workers seeking higher wages. A violent clash between strikers and growers left two workers dead and eight wounded. Five thousand workers gathered in Tulare for the dead strikers' funerals, one of the largest agricultural demonstrations in California's history. Eight cotton growers were indicted in the violence against the workers, but were later acquitted. The strike features in Steinbeck's novel, The Grapes of Wrath, coinciding with the arrival of the Joad family from Oklahoma.

== Geography ==
Pixley is located at 35°58′13″N 119°17′27″W (35.970405, -119.290729).

According to the United States Census Bureau, the CDP has a total area of 5.3 square miles (14 km^{2}), of which 99.6% is land and 0.4% is water.

At the 2010 census, the CDP had a land area of 3.1 square miles (8.0 km^{2}).

=== Climate ===
According to the Köppen Climate Classification system, Pixley has a semi-arid climate, abbreviated "BSk" on climate maps.

== Demographics ==
Historical population
Census	Pop.	Note	%±
1960	1,327		—
1970	1,584		19.4%
1980	2,488		57.1%
1990	2,457		−1.2%
2000	2,586		5.3%
2010	3,310		28.0%
2020	3,828		15.6%
U.S. Decennial Census; 1850–1870 1880-1890; 1900 1910 1920; 1930 1940 1950; 1960 1970 1980; 1990 2000 2010

Pixley first appeared as an unincorporated community in the 1960 U.S. census; and as a census designated place in the 1980 U.S. census.

=== 2020 census ===
As of the 2020 census, Pixley had a population of 3,828 and a population density of 729.1 inhabitants per square mile (281.5/km^{2}). The median age was 26.5 years. The age distribution was 36.2% under the age of 18, 11.6% aged 18 to 24, 27.1% aged 25 to 44, 18.1% aged 45 to 64, and 7.1% aged 65 or older. For every 100 females, there were 97.7 males, and for every 100 females age 18 and over, there were 98.9 males.

The census reported that 99.9% of the population lived in households, 0.1% lived in non-institutionalized group quarters, and no one was institutionalized. Of residents, 0.0% lived in urban areas and 100.0% lived in rural areas.

There were 975 households, of which 55.8% had children under age 18. Of all households, 50.9% were married-couple households, 8.5% were cohabiting couple households, 15.9% had a male householder with no spouse or partner present, and 24.7% had a female householder with no spouse or partner present. About 11.7% of households were one person households, including 5.4% with a person age 65 or older living alone. The average household size was 3.92.

There were 1,014 housing units at an average density of 193.1 units per square mile (74.6 units/km^{2}). Of these units, 96.2% were occupied and 3.8% were vacant. Of occupied units, 42.2% were owner-occupied and 57.8% were renter-occupied. The homeowner vacancy rate was 0.7% and the rental vacancy rate was 2.6%.

Racial composition as of the 2020 census
Race	Number	Percent
White	1,155	30.2%
Black or African American	70	1.8%
American Indian and Alaska Native	73	1.9%
Asian	12	0.3%
Native Hawaiian and Other Pacific Islander	0	0.0%
Some other race	1,618	42.3%
Two or more races	900	23.5%
Hispanic or Latino (of any race)	3,315	86.6%

=== Income and poverty ===
In 2023, the US Census Bureau estimated that the median household income was $70,574, and the per capita income was $17,883. About 10.5% of families and 16.2% of the population were below the poverty line.

=== 2010 census ===
The 2010 United States census reported that Pixley had a population of 3,310. The population density was 1,062.8 inhabitants per square mile (410.3/km^{2}). The racial makeup of Pixley was 1,473 (44.5%) White, 90 (2.7%) African American, 28 (0.8%) Native American, 16 (0.5%) Asian, 0 (0.0%) Pacific Islander, 1,587 (47.9%) from other races, and 116 (3.5%) from two or more races. Hispanic or Latino of any race were 2,675 persons (80.8%).

The Census reported that 3,310 people (100% of the population) lived in households, 0 (0%) lived in non-institutionalized group quarters, and 0 (0%) were institutionalized.

There were 798 households, out of which 498 (62.4%) had children under the age of 18 living in them, 482 (60.4%) were opposite-sex married couples living together, 116 (14.5%) had a female householder with no husband present, 91 (11.4%) had a male householder with no wife present. There were 85 (10.7%) unmarried opposite-sex partnerships, and 5 (0.6%) same-sex married couples or partnerships. 81 households (10.2%) were made up of individuals, and 38 (4.8%) had someone living alone who was 65 years of age or older. The average household size was 4.15. There were 689 families (86.3% of all households); the average family size was 4.34.

The population was spread out, with 1,267 people (38.3%) under the age of 18, 404 people (12.2%) aged 18 to 24, 869 people (26.3%) aged 25 to 44, 562 people (17.0%) aged 45 to 64, and 208 people (6.3%) who were 65 years of age or older. The median age was 24.7 years. For every 100 females, there were 107.3 males. For every 100 females age 18 and over, there were 105.9 males.

There were 875 housing units at an average density of 280.9 per square mile (108.5/km^{2}), of which 433 (54.3%) were owner-occupied, and 365 (45.7%) were occupied by renters. The homeowner vacancy rate was 1.6%; the rental vacancy rate was 9.2%. 1,691 people (51.1% of the population) lived in owner-occupied housing units and 1,619 people (48.9%) lived in rental housing units.

== Government ==
=== Politics ===
In the state legislature, Pixley is located in the 16th senatorial district, represented by Democrat Melissa Hurtado, and in the 33rd Assembly district, represented by Republican Alexandra Macedo.

In the United States House of Representatives, Pixley is in California's 22nd congressional district, represented by Republican David Valadao

== Education ==
Most of the CDP is served by the Pixley Union Elementary School District while one section is within the Tipton Elementary School District. All of it is served by the Tulare Joint Union High School District.

== Notable people ==
- Roy Buchanan, guitarist.
- Roy Harmon, winner of the Congressional Medal of Honor.
