= California agricultural strikes of 1933 =

American labor strike

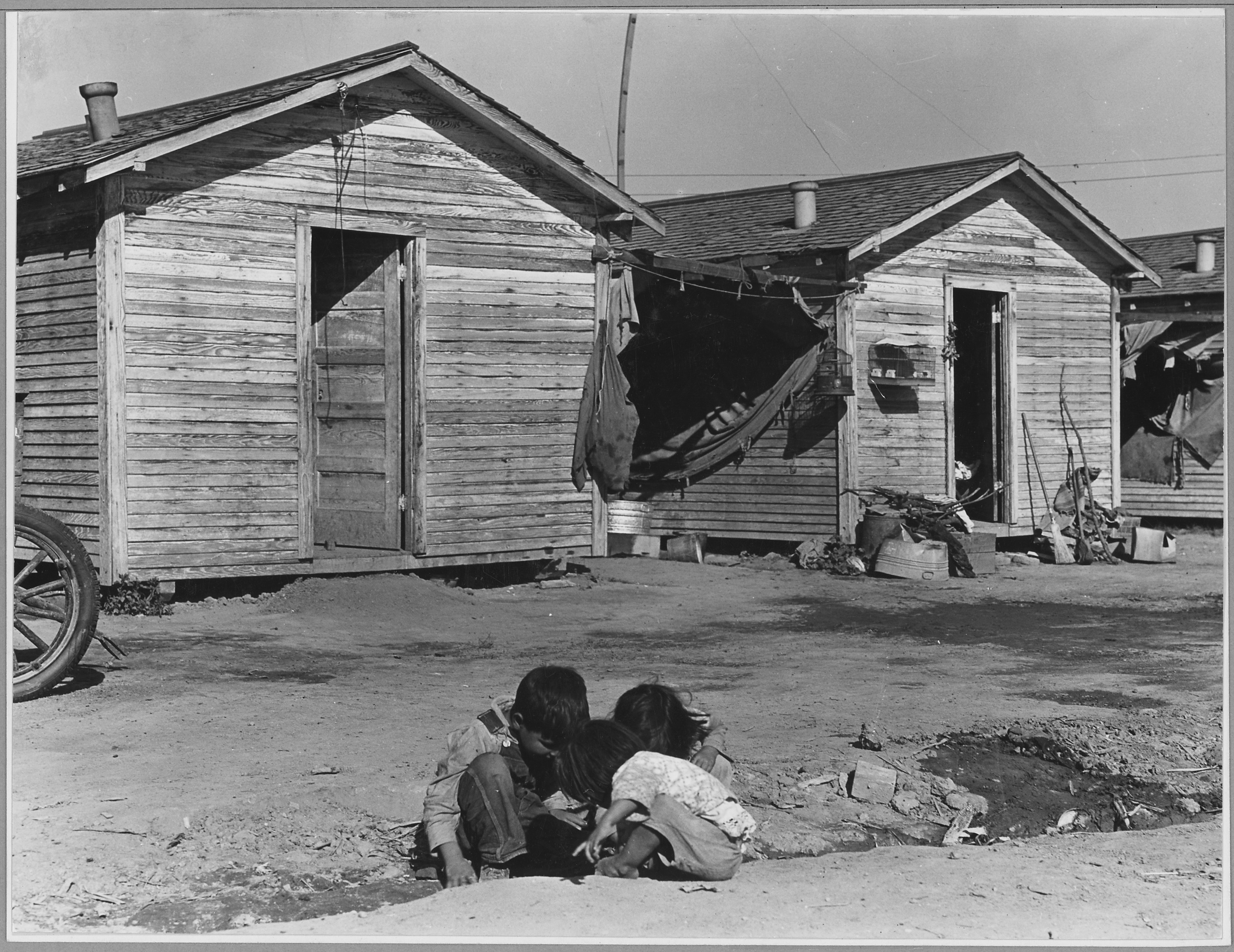
Company housing for Mexican cotton pickers on a large ranch in Corcoran, California. Photo taken in 1940.

The California agricultural strikes of 1933 were a series of strikes by mostly Mexican and Filipino agricultural workers throughout the San Joaquin Valley. More than 47,500 workers were involved in the wave of approximately 30 strikes from 1931 to 1941. Twenty-four of the strikes, involving 37,500 union members, were led by the Cannery and Agricultural Workers' Industrial Union (CAWIU). (Note: Among the strikes were: An April 14 strike by 2,000 Mexican, Filipino, and white pea pickers; 600 Mexican berry pickers; 1,000 cherry pickers; several strikes on August 7–8 by 1,000 Mexican and Filipino sugar beet harvesters; strikes on August 7–8 by 400 tomato pickers; several strikes beginning August 14 by pear pickers, peach pickers, sugar beet harvesters, and 4,000 grape pickers, in addition to other fruit workers. In October, the strike wave both culminated and ended when cotton pickers struck a large number of employers in the San Joaquin Valley, about 80 percent of whom were Mexican.) The strikes are grouped together because most of them were organized by the CAWIU. Strike actions began in August among cherry, grape, peach, pear, sugar beet, and tomato workers, and culminated in a number of strikes against cotton growers in the San Joaquin Valley in October. The cotton strikes involved the largest number of workers. Sources vary as to numbers involved in the cotton strikes, with some sources claiming 18,000 workers and others just 12,000 workers, (Note: The cotton pickers strike was, according to historian Rodolfo Acuña, the largest agricultural workers' strike in California at that time.) 80% of whom were Mexican.

In the cotton strikes of 1933, striking workers were evicted from company housing while growers and managerial staff were deputized by local law enforcement. Attacks by employers on peaceful striking workers were common and the surrounding community of bankers, merchants, ministers, and Boy Scouts encouraged the attacks. As a sheriff stated, "We protect our farmers here in Kern county. But the Mexicans are trash. They have no standard of living. We herd them like pigs." In Pixley, California, two strikers, Dolores Hernàndez and Delfino D'Ávila, were murdered and eight others wounded after "local sheriffs handed out six hundred citizen's permits to carry concealed weapons." Eight growers faced charges in the shootings, but all were acquitted. Another man, Pedro Subia, was murdered near Arvin, California. Workers came from camps from all around the Bakersfield area to commemorate his life at Bakersfield City Hall. CAWIU organizers Pat Chambers and Caroline Decker were arrested and charged under the California Criminal Syndicalism Act for their labor organizing activities.

== Culmination ==
Cotton growers in the San Joaquin Valley used extremely low labor costs to become the leading producer of the staple in the country, producing more cotton per acre than the Old South. Although California cotton growers paid marginally better than cotton growers in other states, wages for cotton pickers in California had declined significantly from $1.50 per hundred pounds in 1928 to just 40 cents per hundred pounds in 1932 (although the rate could go as high as 60 cents per hundred pounds for ground being picked over a second or third time). Wages for cotton pickers in the San Joaquin Valley were set by the Agricultural Labor Bureau, an employers' organization. In 1929, the Great Depression lowered the demand for cotton and many marginal planters lost their assets to Bank of America and others who held the notes. The US government bailed the growers out in 1933, offering them subsidies. The pickers hoped the growers would support them with the bailout, but this did not happen, which prompted the strike.

The Cannery and Agricultural Workers' Industrial Union, a communist worker's organization, had been organizing in the cotton fields for some time, and by 1933 had come to provide leadership for the cotton pickers, most of whom were Mexican. The CAWIU was militant in its demands, and threatened a valley-wide strike if they were not met. These demands included a wage rate of $1.00 per hundred pounds of cotton picked, recognition of the CAWIU as the workers' collective bargaining agent, and abolition of "contract labor" (the contracting of a large group of workers for a one-time job or for seasonal labor). These demands were made in practically every cotton strike which followed in 1933. On September 18, the cotton strikes were organized by a group of seventy-eight men and women who "concluded that it took the average picker 10 hours to harvest 300 pounds. Planters offered 40 cents a hundredweight – that was not enough to buy enough food and gas to get to the next job. The workers demanded a dollar per hundredweight." The planters reluctantly raised their offer to 60 cents, following public pressure, but this was not enough, so the strike began.

== The cotton strikes of October 1933 ==
The cotton strikes began on October 4, 1933, with the establishment of picket lines by workers at the work site: "At the Camp. West and Lowe ranch, the pickets were uncommunicative, but it was learned through their captain that the picketers are organized for shifts continuing throughout twenty-four hours. All wore signs reading 'This ranch under strike.'" The strike was primarily organized by women, because of their complex social networks which allowed them to communicate across worker camps and share when and where a strike would take place. The Los Angeles Times reported that the rationale for the strikes was to obtain "a rate increase of 40 cents a hundred pounds for picketers over the rate established at the recent meeting of the San Joaquin Valley Agricultural Bureau, and which cotton growers throughout Kern county agreed to support. The rate as established is 60 cents per hundred pounds."

When growers initially received word of the strike, they mobilized an all-out war against them. Seventy-five Kings County planters gave pickers and their families five minutes to load all their belongings on trucks and then dumped them in the highway. "The sheriff and I told the growers not to worry about the pickers' rights anyway," said Kings County District Attorney Clarence Wilson. Fortunately for the workers the Cannery and Agricultural Workers' Industrial Union had rented camp spaces close to the cotton-picking centers, the most important one being in Corcoran, California. The townspeople barely tolerated the Mexican workers and accessing basic needs like health care was difficult. As one Corcoran nurse stated "No, we have to give her a bath first. You Mexicans are all dirty." On the first day of the strike, a California Highway Patrol vehicle came through the town, two blocks from the railroad crossing, with a machine gun mounted. Rudy Castro, a witness, stated that "they were ready to mow down these strikers, all because they had the audacity to ask for more money." There were nearly 3,800 strikers at the Corcoran camp, and the workers outnumbered the townspeople almost two to one. A tent school was established at the camp for about seventy children, while, in another area of the camp, Corcoran resident Lino Sànchez facilitated nightly meetings.

Three days into the protests, the cotton growers became concerned that their cotton crop was not going to be picked at its peak value, and that angry workers would destroy their crops or harm workers who engaged in strikebreaking. Two days later, the strike turned violent and workers were evicted from company housing. in Tulare County, armed men employed by the growers clashed with striking workers and CAWIU labor organizers, and CAWIU staff were forcibly ejected out of the county. Growers in Kings, Fresno, Madera, Merced Stanislaus, and San Luis Obispo counties armed themselves and their employees, announcing they would drive off any troublemakers. In Kern County, about 200 strikers and their families were evicted from their employer-owned cottages, their belongings dumped on the road, and told to get out of the county or face trouble.

Tensions reached a peak on October 10 in Pixley when about 30 ranchers surrounded a meeting of striking workers. The ranchers fired on the strikers, killing three and wounded a number of others. That same day, a group of striking grape pickers faced a group of armed growers' men at a farm near Arvin, California, about 60 miles (97 km) south of Pixley. After several hours confronting one another at the border of the employer's land, the two sides began attacking each other (the workers armed with wooden poles, the growers' men using the butt of their rifles). A shot rang out and a striking worker, Pedro Subia, was killed. A sheriff's deputy threw a tear gas grenade at the group, and the growers' men opened fire. Several strikers were wounded.

== End of the cotton strikes ==
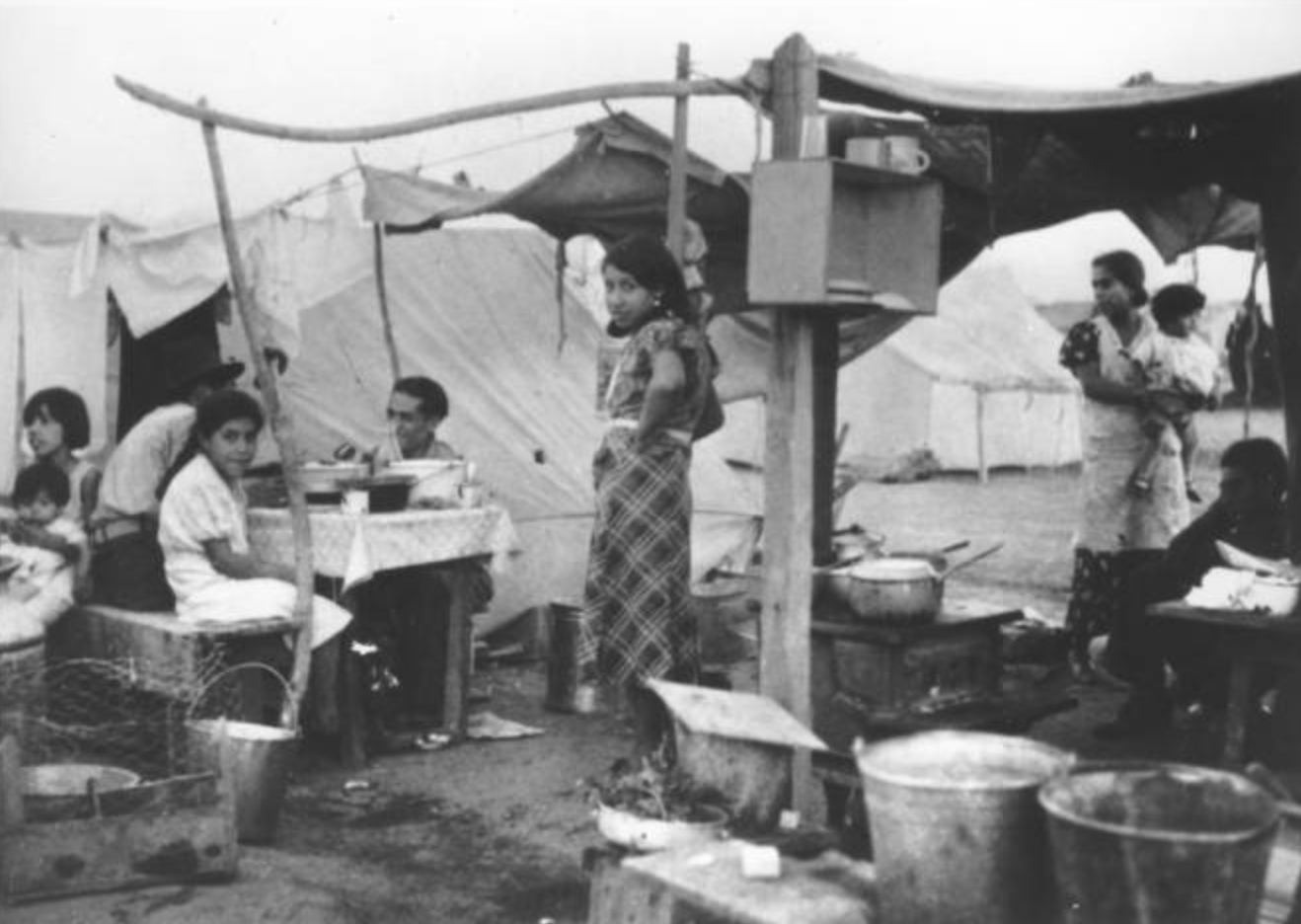
In a Pixley Cotton Strike camp with women and children in an eating area.

The cotton strikes came to a halt at the end of October. The killings at Pixley and Arvin led to public condemnation of the growers' actions, and the California Highway Patrol flooded the area to restore order. Federal and state strike mediators arrived to try to end the strikes, and federal welfare and public works officials arrived to see what they could do to end economic problems that might be causing the strikes. Angry workers wished to engage in armed reprisal against growers, but CAWIU leaders were able to prevent this. Public opinion supported the strikers so strongly now that California Governor James Rolph agreed to meet with union leaders to receive their demands. Although Rolph declined to send in more police or disarm growers, he did announce that the State Emergency Relief Administration would spend federal money to provide financial assistance to striking workers.

George Creel, chair of the Regional Labor Board of the National Labor Board (a federal labor relations agency), began to aggressively intervene as a mediator in the strikes. Although Creel lacked any formal powers, his bravado and air of authority impressed both growers and union workers. He warned growers that the Roosevelt administration would suspend federal agricultural assistance to California if violence continued, and proposed a three-member fact-finding commission to settle the strike. The growers agreed. Because Creel had assured the growers that workers would return to work at the rate of 60 cents per hundred pounds while the commission did its work, both the federal government and state officials mounted a major "back to work" effort to end the strikes on October 14. The effort failed. When state officials conditioned the receipt of relief payments on a return to work, striking workers refused to accept them. The state unconditionally resumed payments on October 21. The commission held its hearings on October 19 and 20. Pushed by Creel, the commission announced on October 23 that growers should offer a rate of 75 cents per hundred. The growers accepted this solution on October 25. CAWIU asked for 80 cents per hundred and recognition of the union, but Creel said relief payments would be completely cut off if the workers did not agree to the commission's rate. Although workers were apparently overwhelmingly in favor of continuing the strikes, CAWIU leaders agreed to the commission's solution on October 26 and called an end to all cotton strikes then ongoing in California.

== See also ==
- Venice celery strike of 1936
- Strikes in the United States in the 1930s
- List of worker deaths in United States labor disputes

== Bibliography ==
- Acuña, Rodolfo (2007). Corridors of Migration: The Odyssey of Mexican Laborers, 1600-1933. Tucson: University of Arizona Press. ISBN 9780816526369.
- Barry, Raymond P., ed. (1938). A Documentary History of Migratory Farm Labor in California: The California Cotton Pickers Strike, 1933 (Report). Oakland, Calif.: Federal Writers' Project.
- Bronfenbrenner, Kate (1990). "California Farmworkers' Strikes of 1933". In Filippelli, Ronald L. (ed.). Labor Conflict in the United States: An Encyclopedia. New York: Garland Publishing. ISBN 9780824079680.
- Daniel, Cletus E. (1982). Bitter Harvest: A History of California Farmworkers, 1870-1941. Berkeley, Calif.: University of California Press. ISBN 9780520047228.
- Guerin-Gonzales, Camille (1994). Mexican Workers and American Dreams: Immigration, Repatriation, and California Farm Labor, 1900-1939. Rutgers University Press. ISBN 9780813520483.
