= California Criminal Syndicalism Act =

1919 law prohibiting certain leftist politics

California State Legislature
- Signed into law: Yes

Status: Repealed

The California Criminal Syndicalism Act (Stats. 1919, c. 188, p. 281; it was codified at California Penal Code §§ 11400 et seq.) was a law of California in 1919 under Governor William Stephens criminalizing syndicalism. It was enacted on April 30, 1919, and repealed in 1991. The law stated that "any person who was a member of any organization that advocated criminal syndicalism was guilty of a felony and punishable by up to 14 years in the state prison. The law is significant, and controversial, because it made certain beliefs illegal. A person did not have to commit any overt act. Simple advocacy of a certain belief or membership in a group that advocated syndicalism was enough to secure a conviction".

One of the Act's best-known convictions was that of Charlotte Anita Whitney, which led to the Act being upheld by the Supreme Court of the United States in Whitney v. California (1927), which was itself explicitly overturned in Brandenburg v. Ohio (1969), effectively declaring the Act unconstitutional.

The Act was enacted during the First Red Scare and amid labor unrest in the United States in the early 20th century. From 1910 to 1920, 20 states enacted laws criminalizing syndicalism.

== Convictions ==
One of the Act's best-known convictions was of Charlotte Anita Whitney in 1920, which led to the Act being upheld by the Supreme Court of the United States in Whitney v. California (1927).

In April 1930, meetings of the Agricultural Workers' Industrial League (AWIL) across Imperial Valley but centered around El Centro were raided by the Imperial County Sheriff. Of the hundreds arrested, 16 were charged by the Imperial County Grand Jury with violations of the Criminal Syndicalism Act, and 8 were convicted on 13 June 1930 and received sentences ranging from deportation to 42 years in prison. In 1931, the conviction of Frank Spector was reversed by the California Court of Appeal for the Fourth District in Fresno, California. All of the convicts were paroled by 1933.

According to journalist and historian Carey McWilliams, there were 531 indictments for violation of the Criminal Syndicalism Act between 1919 and 1924, and "Of those arrested, 264 were tried, 164 convicted, and 128 were sentenced to San Quentin Prison for terms of from one to fourteen years. A large part of these prosecutions arose in Southern California."
