= Anti-Filipino sentiment =

Discrimination against the Filipino people

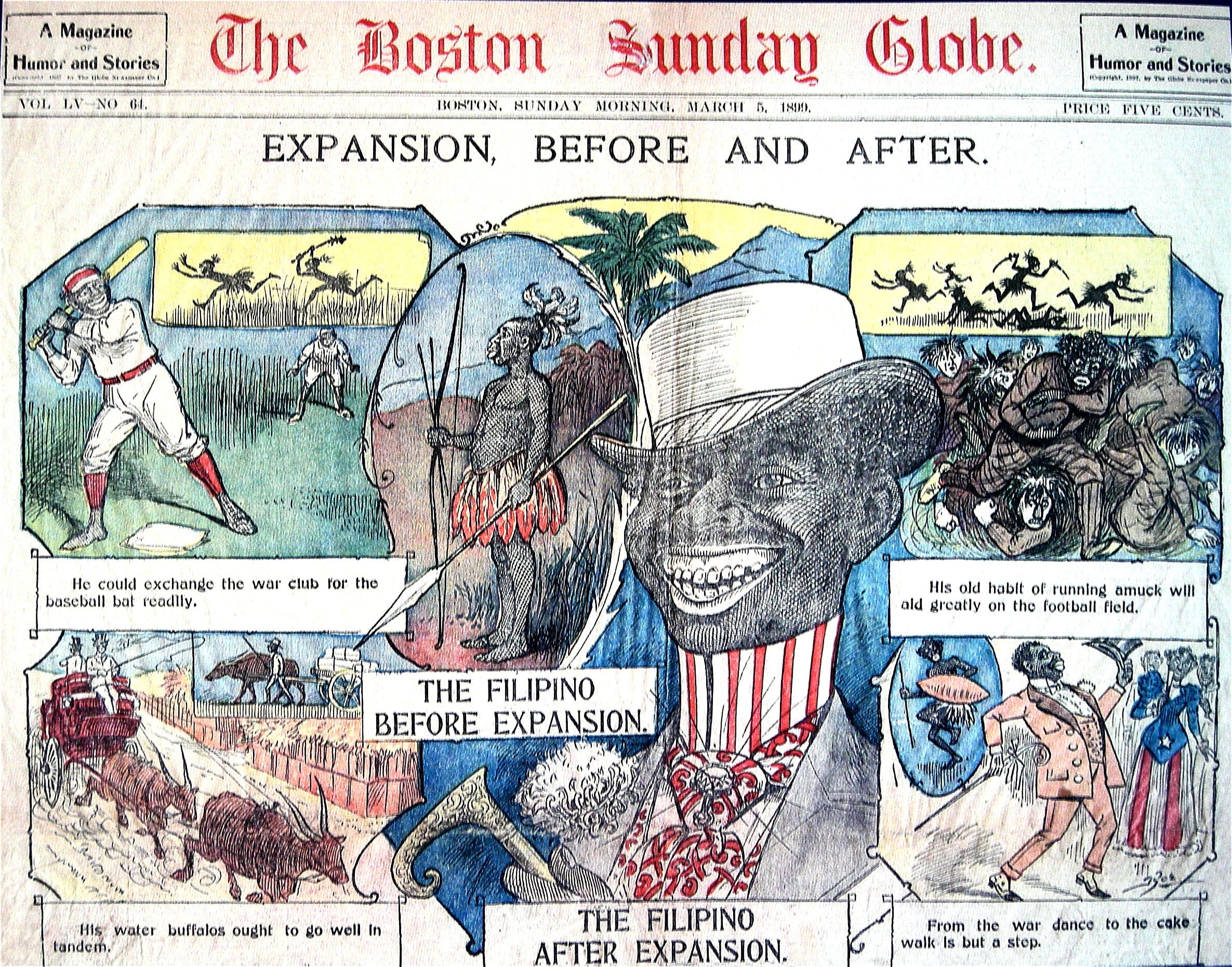
March 5, 1899 edition of the Boston Sunday Globe depicting a racist caricature of a Filipino before and after "benevolent assimilation"

Anti-Filipino sentiment refers to the general dislike or hatred towards the Philippines, Filipinos, or Filipino culture. This can come in the form of direct slurs or persecution, in the form of connoted microaggressions, or depictions of the Philippines or the Filipino people as being inferior in some form psychologically, culturally or physically.

== By country ==
=== Hong Kong ===
During the 1970–80s, Hong Kong saw the rise of a Filipino population. Many of these Filipinos were working as domestic helpers. The increase of Filipino population there created clashes between Hong Kong residents and Filipino workers. The Democratic Alliance for the Betterment of Hong Kong launched an advocacy that Filipinos were causing a significant rise in local unemployment in Hong Kong and costing billions in welfare treatment.

Anti-Filipino sentiment in Hong Kong rose again after the 2010 hostage crisis in Manila, Metro Manila, Philippines, in which a bus full of mostly Hong Kong tourists riding in a Hong Thai Bus was besieged by a former Filipino police officer, and where subsequent investigations found Filipino officials' handling of the hostage crisis to be directly responsible for the hostages' deaths. Tensions eased after Cabinet Secretary Jose Rene Almendras and Joseph Estrada secretly went to Hong Kong to talk to officials and the victim's families.

Chinese racism against Filipinos has intensified in the 21st century, especially in Chinese social media, where Chinese accounts have depicted the Filipinos as "gullible banana sellers and maids".

=== Indonesia ===
In 2016, anti-Filipino sentiment existed within the Confederation of Indonesian Worker's Unions (KPSI) organization after the recent kidnappings of Indonesian citizens by Sulu-based terrorist group, Abu Sayyaf. A protest was held by a group of Indonesian protesters of KPSI when they gathered in front of the Philippine Embassy in Indonesia, holding banners that read "Go to hell Philippines and Abu Sayyaf" and "Destroy the Philippines and Abu Sayyaf" to demanding more action from the Philippine government to fighting terrorism in their country, which has since affected neighbouring countries but their relationship stand still.

=== Kuwait ===
Filipinos and other foreign migrant workers experience discrimination in most Gulf Arab nations, where they are given very few human rights. A Filipina maid in Kuwait was killed in 2019 by her employers and stored in a freezer. This, and other incidents of human rights abuses, led to the 2018 Kuwait–Philippines diplomatic crisis, which banned Filipinos from working in the Kuwait until it enacted reforms.

=== Malaysia ===
The anti-Filipino sentiment is most notable in the state of Sabah, in Malaysia, due to a large presence of Filipino Moro illegal immigrants, causing simmering resentment in the state. Sabahan locals pejoratively refer to illegal immigrants from the southern Philippines as Pilak, meaning silver or money in the Tausug language. Some Sabahan locals have accused Muslim Filipino illegal immigrants, who arrived in the 1970s from the Southern Philippines insurgency, have "brought along their social problems, culture of crime, and poverty conditions", as well as "taking away jobs, business opportunities" and allegedly "stealing Sabahan native land (NCR)" in the state. This hatred was further strengthened when many of these illegal immigrants were involved in crime, mostly robbery, murder and rape. Locals became the main victims which affected the security of the state, as evidenced by the 1985 ambush, 2000 kidnappings and 2013 standoff. A royal commission of inquiry on illegal immigrants in Sabah found that large amounts had been spent for these Filipino illegal immigrants' life maintenance and the amount remains unpaid until today, despite attempts to recover the monies. Sabah Health Department said that infectious disease among illegal immigrants was on the rise resulting in more expenditures, as well as provisions for more funds to accommodate the logistics, such as medical officers and others. This discrimination was a result of Filipino immigrants to Sabah fleeing the violence of the Moro conflict which destroyed their homes in Mindanao and Sulu; a conflict originated from the atrocities committed during Ferdinand Marcos dictatorship in the 1970s under his Martial Law, which include massacres and abuses towards the Muslim community in Southern Mindanao. Filipino refugees also feel trapped as the Malaysian government refused to grant citizenship to many such refugees, classifying them as a stateless people.

=== Singapore ===
The estimated number of Filipinos working in Singapore tripled in the past decade to about 167,000, as of 2013, according to Philippines census data. Amid increasing general resentment towards foreigners, a backlash towards Filipinos has taken place in Singapore. In 2014, a plan to hold a Philippine Independence Day celebration on Singapore's main shopping street, Orchard Road, was cancelled following online complaints by some Singaporeans who said the space was special to locals. One blogger called the move "insensitive", saying: "Celebrating your Independence Day openly in the public (especially [at a] iconic/tourist location like Orchard Road) is provocative".

Anti-Filipino sentiment has continued to swirl online, culminating in a blog titled "Blood Stained Singapore" suggesting ways to abuse Filipinos, calling them "an infestation". The suggestions, which included pushing Filipinos out of trains and threats to spray insecticide on them, eventually caused the blog to be taken down by Google for infringing content rules.

=== Taiwan ===
Anti-Filipino sentiment in Taiwan was noticeable in 2013, as a result of the Philippine Coast Guard killing a Taiwanese fisherman. Subsequently, there was widespread discrimination towards Filipino workers with Taiwanese businesses, taking off any Filipino related products from their shelves and some shops refusing to welcome Filipino customers. Sanctions placed by the Taiwanese government were removed after an official apology from the Philippine side was made.

=== United Kingdom ===
Following a poisoning incident at the Stepping Hill Hospital in 2011 by a Filipino nurse named Victorino Chua, the Daily Mail published an article with a headline of "NHS still hiring Filipino nurses", which was condemned by many organizations for 'singling out nurses from the Philippines for special criticism on the basis of one criminal case'. Many Filipinos and British Filipinos criticized the response of the British media in general to the poisoning, stating that it was motivated by political convictions and an 'attempt to discredit public sector workers', including Filipino workers who were immigrants.

=== United States ===
The American colonization of the Philippines instigated the immigration of many Filipinos to America, either as pensionados, who came to further their education, or as laborers, who worked in Hawaiian plantations, California farms, and the Alaska fishing industry.

Ethnic discrimination towards Filipinos in America was evident during the American colonial period in the Philippines. Filipino immigrants suffered from wider anti-Oriental prejudice present in America at the time, often confused with the Chinese and Japanese immigrants that had preceded them. Filipinos were perceived to be taking the jobs of white Americans. They were accused of attracting white women which led to the passing of an anti-miscegenation law. These interactions between Filipino men and white women were facilitated in part by the taxi dance halls, often visited by the migrant population, during the 1920s. These were merely racial prejudices. Filipino immigrants in America were affected by various socio-economic factors. The majority of Filipino immigrants of that era were men. The gender ratio of Filipino males to females in California then was approximately 14 to 1. Filipino workers were forced to live in poor conditions since they were poorly paid.

The first documented incident occurred on New Year's Eve 1926, in Stockton, when Filipinos were stabbed and beaten. These anti-Filipino attacks increased with the Great Depression. Thus, the Stockton 1926 attack was not the last: in November 1927, Filipinos were attacked in Yakima Valley, Washington; in September 1928, Filipinos were attacked in Wenatchee Valley, Washington; in October 1929, Filipinos were attacked in Exeter, California; and in January 1930, Filipinos were attacked in Watsonville, California, during the Watsonville Riots, leading to the death of Fermin Tobera. In Stockton's Little Manila, the Filipino Federation of America building was bombed. In the context of these rising tensions, the government felt compelled to act. Firstly, at a regional level, as the state legislature of California declared Filipinos to be a threat to racial stability. Action at a national level followed in 1934, as Congress passed the Tydings-McDuffie Act. This paved the way for the later independence of the Philippines and effectively halted large-scale Filipino migration to the United States.

World War II was a significant turning point for American views towards Filipinos. During the early period of the war, Filipinos were prohibited to join the army. However, in 1942, President Franklin Roosevelt allowed Filipinos to serve in the armed forces. During the war, many Filipinos fought with Americans in Asia and Europe, while some opted to be civilians involved in mobilization efforts. The United States recognized and affirmed the Filipinos' right to citizenship with the amended Nationality Act of 1940. Through the amendment, non-citizens who joined the military were given opportunity to attain citizenship. About ten thousand Filipinos became American citizens through the amendment.

In the 1990s, Filipino Americans in Alaska were depicted negatively in the media, often as liabilities and associated with gang violence. In the 2000s, Filipino American students in California were often stereotyped as lazy delinquents who were not encouraged to pursue college.

== Derogatory terms ==
There are a variety of derogatory terms referring to the Philippines and Filipinos. Many of these terms are viewed as racist. However, these terms do not necessarily refer to Filipinos as a whole; they can also refer to specific policies or specific time periods in history.

=== Chinese ===
- Huan-a (Chinese: 番仔; Pe̍h-ōe-jī: hoan-á) – a pejorative term in the Hokkien or Minnan languages literally meaning "barbarian". Used by Hoklo-speakers from Taiwan and overseas Chinese living in South East Asia to refer generally to Austronesians, including Taiwanese indigenous peoples. In the Philippines, this term is used by Chinese Filipinos to refer to those of Austronesian Filipino descent.
- Hóuzi (Chinese: 猴子) – literally meaning "monkey", used as derogatory term by Chinese people on Chinese social media, mostly those who are loyal to the Chinese Communist Party and shows their nationalistic pride, to refer to Filipinos during the territorial dispute in Spratly Islands and Scarborough Shoal. Shuǐ hóuzi (Chinese: 水猴子) is another derogatory term, meaning "water monkey".

=== English ===
- Gugus – a racial term used to refer to Filipino guerillas during the Philippine–American War. The term came from gugo, the Tagalog name for Entada phaseoloides or the St. Thomas bean, the bark of which was used by Filipinas to shampoo their hair. The term was a predecessor to the term gook, a racial term used to refer to all Asians.
- Flip – used to refer to American-born Filipinos. The term has vague origins with many hypotheses regarding its origin. It is suggested that the term originates from the World War II era. The term was allegedly an acronym for "fucking little island people" as such some Filipinos avoid referring to themselves using this term.

=== Malay ===
- Pilak – literally meaning 'silver' or 'money' in Tausug language used pejoratively by Sabahans to refer to illegal immigrants from BARMM of the Philippines.

=== Spanish ===
- Indio – literally, "Indian". The term was used to refer to native Filipinos during the Spanish colonization of the Philippines and developed negative connotations due to the mistreatment of people with the label. "Filipino" was meanwhile originally used to refer to the Spanish persons born in the archipelago.

== See also ==
- Little brown brother
- Si Tandang Bacio Macunat
