= Xenophobia in the United States =

Dislike of that which is perceived to be foreign or strange within the United States

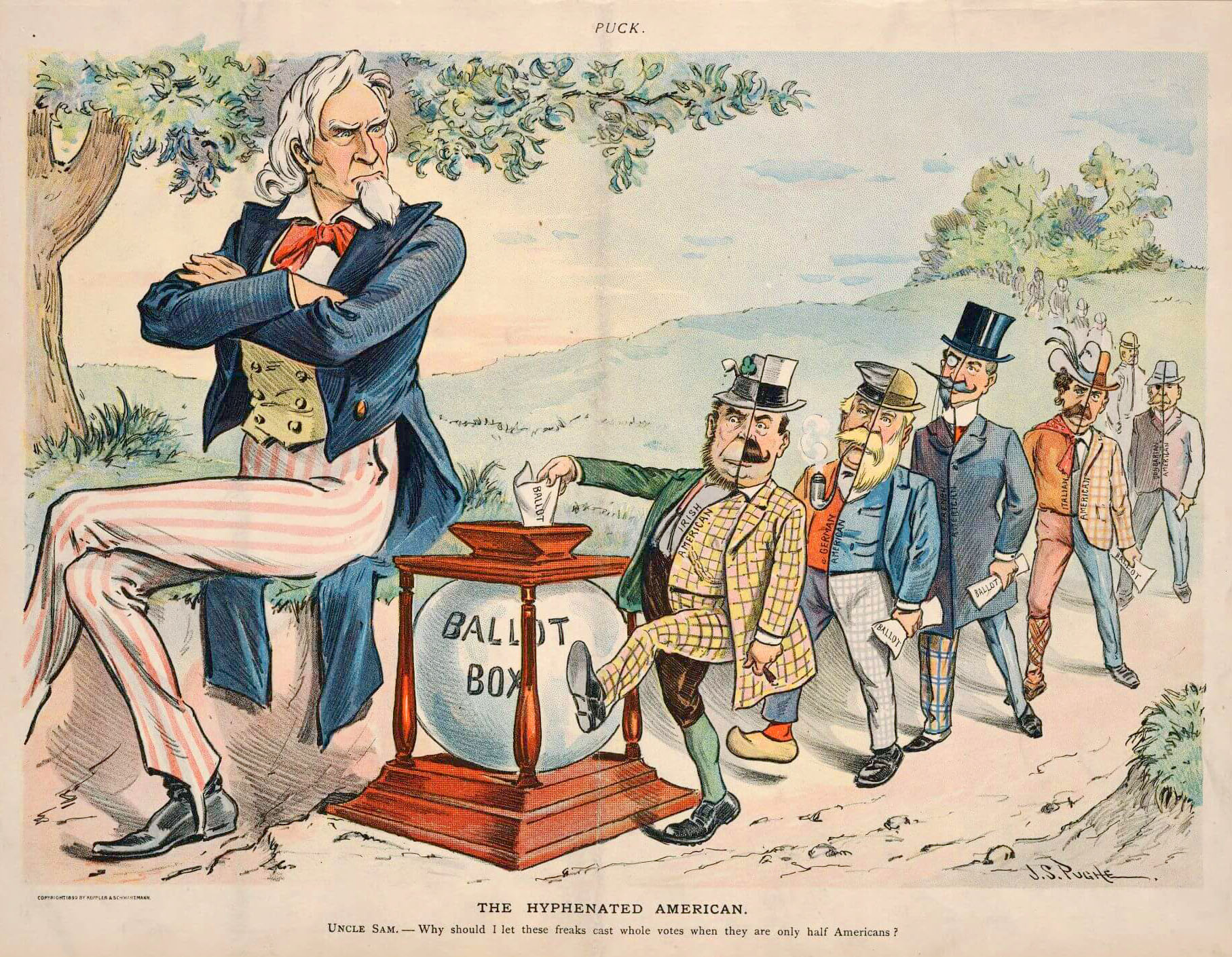
Cartoon from Puck, August 9, 1899 by J. S. Pughe. Uncle Sam sees hyphenated voters and asks, "Why should I let these freaks cast whole ballots when they are only half Americans?"

Xenophobia in the United States is the fear or hatred of any cultural group in the United States that is perceived as being foreign or strange or un-American. It expresses a conflict between an ingroup and an outgroup and may manifest as suspicion by one of the other's activities, and beliefs and goals. It includes a desire to eliminate their presence, and fear of losing national, ethnic, or racial identity and is often closely linked to racism and discrimination.

This has resulted in discriminatory laws, such as the internment of Japanese Americans during World War II, restrictions on immigration policies and other actions including violence.

== Anti-Catholic xenophobia ==
During the 18th and 19th centuries, many states in the United States allowed non-citizens to vote. Anti-Irish Catholic sentiment and anti-German Catholic sentiment following the War of 1812 and intensifying again in the 1840s lead many states, particularly in the Northeast, to amend their constitutions to prohibit non-citizens from voting. States that banned non-citizen voting during this time included New Hampshire in 1814, Virginia in 1818, Connecticut in 1819, New Jersey in 1820, Massachusetts in 1822, Vermont in 1828, Pennsylvania in 1838, Delaware in 1831, Tennessee in 1834, Rhode Island in 1842, Illinois in 1848, Ohio and Maryland in 1851, and North Carolina in 1856.

== Anti-Italian xenophobia ==
Anti-Italianism arose among some Americans as an effect of the large-scale immigration of Italians to the United States during the late 19th and early 20th centuries. The majority of Italian immigrants to the United States arrived in waves in the early 20th century, many of them from agrarian backgrounds. Nearly all the Italian immigrants were Catholic, as opposed to the nation's Protestant majority. Because the immigrants often lacked formal education and competed with earlier immigrants for lower-paying jobs and housing, significant hostility developed toward them.

In reaction to the large-scale immigration from Southern Europe and Eastern Europe, the United States Congress passed legislation (Emergency Quota Act of 1921 and Immigration Act of 1924) severely restricting immigration from those regions, but putting comparatively fewer restrictions on immigration from Northern European countries.

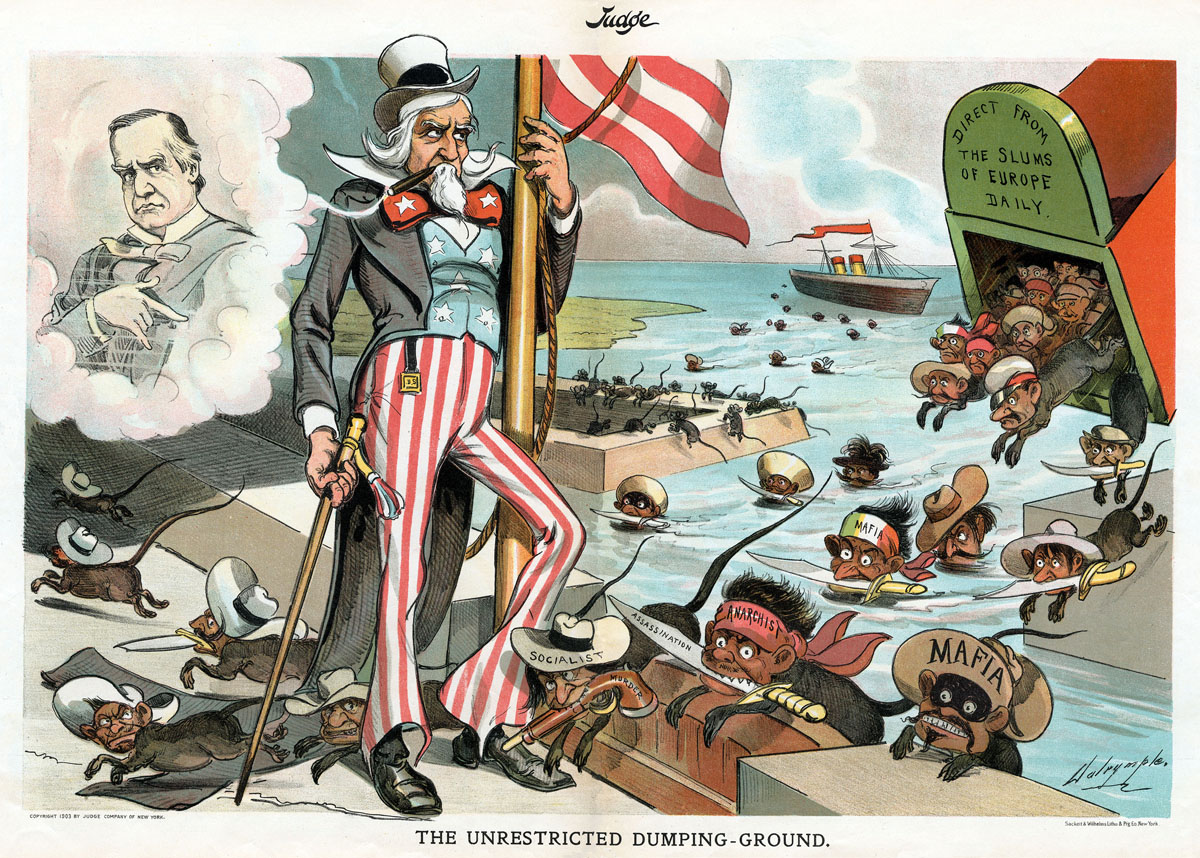
Anti-Italian cartoon by Louis Dalrymple depicting Italian immigrants as rats carrying mafia, socialism and anarchy. Published on Judge magazine, 1903

Anti-Italian prejudice was sometimes associated with the anti-Catholic tradition that existed in the United States, which was inherited as a result of Protestant/Catholic European competition and wars, which had been fought between Protestants and Catholics over the preceding three centuries. When the United States was founded, it inherited the anti-Catholic, anti-papal animosity of its original Protestant settlers. Anti-Catholic sentiments in the U.S. reached a peak in the 19th century, when the Protestant population became alarmed by the large number of Catholics who were immigrating to the United States from Ireland and Germany. The resulting anti-Catholic nativist movement, achieved prominence in the 1840s and 1850s. It had largely faded away before the Italians arrived in large numbers after 1880. The Italian immigrants, unlike some of the other Catholic immigrant groups, generally did not bring with them priests and other religious figures who could help ease their transition into American life. To remedy this situation, Pope Leo XIII dispatched a contingent of priests, nuns and brothers of the Missionaries of Saint Charles Borromeo and other orders (among which was Sister Francesca Cabrini), who helped establish hundreds of parishes to serve the needs of the Italian communities, such as Our Lady of Pompeii in New York City.

Some of the early 20th-century immigrants from Italy brought with them a political disposition toward anarchism. This was a reaction to the economic and political conditions which they had experienced in Italy. Such men as Arturo Giovannitti, Carlo Tresca, and Joe Ettor were at the forefront of organising Italians and other immigrant laborers in demanding better working conditions and shorter working hours in the mining, textile, garment, construction and other industries. These efforts often resulted in strikes, which sometimes erupted into violence between the strikers and strike-breakers. Italians were often strikebreakers. The anarchy movement in the United States at that time was responsible for bombings in major cities, and attacks on officials and law enforcement. As a result of the association of some with the labour and anarchy movements, Italian Americans were branded as "labor agitators" and radicals by many of the business owners and the upper class of the time, which resulted in further anti-Italian sentiment.

The vast majority of Italian immigrants worked hard and lived honest lives, as documented by police statistics of the early 20th century in Boston and New York City. Italian immigrants had an arrest rate that was no greater than those of other major immigrant groups. As late as 1963, James W. Vander Zander noted that the rate of criminal convictions among Italian immigrants was less than that among American-born whites.

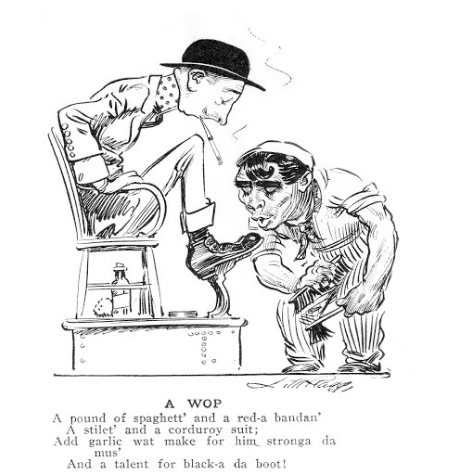
A satirical cartoon published in 1911 on Life Magazine which negatively portrays an Italian immigrant addressed with the derogatory term "wop"

A criminal element that was active in some of the Italian immigrant communities in the large eastern cities used extortion, intimidation and threats in order to extract protection money from the wealthier immigrants and shop owners (known as the Black Hand racket), and it was also involved in other illegal activities as well. When the Fascists came to power in Italy, they made the destruction of the Mafia in Sicily a high priority. Hundreds fled to the United States in the 1920s and 1930s in order to avoid prosecution.

When the United States enacted prohibition in 1920, the restrictions proved to be an economic windfall for those in the Italian-American community who were already involved in illegal activities, as well as those who had fled from Sicily. They smuggled liquor into the country, wholesaled and sold it through a network of outlets and speakeasies. While members of other ethnic groups were also deeply involved in these illegal bootlegging activities, and the associated violence between groups, Italian Americans were among the most notorious. Because of this, Italians became associated with the prototypical gangster in the minds of many, which had a long-lasting effect on the Italian-American image.

The experiences of Italian immigrants in North American countries were notably different from those in South American countries, where many of them immigrated in large numbers. Italians were key in developing countries such as: Argentina, Brazil, Chile, Uruguay and Venezuela. They quickly joined the middle and upper classes in those countries. In the U.S., Italian Americans initially encountered an established Protestant-majority Northern European culture. For a time, they were viewed mainly as construction and industrial workers, chefs, plumbers, or other blue collar workers. Like the Irish before them, many entered police and fire departments of major cities.

== California gold rush ==
In the years of 1849 and 1850 Chileans were particularly targeted by Anglos during the California gold rush. Anti-Chilean violence stated in the mines but spread later to the towns and cities.

Hostility toward foreign miners during the Gold Rush was also reflected in discriminatory legislation such as the Foreign Miners' Tax Act of 1850, which imposed fees on non-citizen miners.

The rapid influx of migrants from the United States and abroad made California’s mining regions highly diverse during the Gold Rush, with miners arriving from Latin America, China, Europe, and other regions. This diversity contributed to tensions and frequent conflicts among different groups of miners, as competition for access to gold intensified. Contemporary accounts note that American miners often attempted to exclude foreign miners from productive claims, contributing to patterns of hostility and discrimination in mining areas.

Chinese immigrants who arrived during the Gold Rush also faced discrimination, exclusion, and hostility, including harassment and episodes of violence, and were often confined to abandoned mining claims while being subjected to discriminatory taxation. Chinese immigrants were favored as hired laborers because of their work ethic, which later contributed to a ten-year suspension of Chinese immigration with the passing of the Chinese Exclusion Act of 1882.

== Know-Nothing Party, 1854-1856 ==
The Know Nothing party was a nativist political party in the mid-1850s. It carried many state and local elections in 1854-1855, but failed to pass major laws and suddenly collapsed.

Know Nothing agitators proclaimed that a "Romanist" conspiracy headed by the Pope in Rome was in control of Catholic immigrants. The goal was to subvert civil and religious liberty and destroy Protestantism. In response it was urgent to politically organize native-born Protestants. The Know Nothing movement emphasized that Irish Catholic priests and bishops would control a large bloc of voters in the Democratic Party. Henry Winter Davis, an active Know-Nothing, was elected on the American Party ticket to Congress from Maryland. He told Congress in late 1856 that the un-American Irish Catholic immigrants were to blame for the recent election of Democrat James Buchanan as president, stating:

The recent election has developed in an aggravated form every evil against which the American party protested. Foreign allies have decided the government of the country -- men naturalized in thousands on the eve of the election. Again in the fierce struggle for supremacy, men have forgotten the ban which the Republic puts on the intrusion of religious influence on the political arena. These influences have brought vast multitudes of foreign-born citizens to the polls, ignorant of American interests, without American feelings, influenced by foreign sympathies, to vote on American affairs; and those votes have, in point of fact, accomplished the present result.

In the South, the party did not emphasize anti-Catholicism but instead attacked corrupt Democratic politicians and filled the vacuum caused by the collapse of the Whig Party. The ideology and influence lasted only one or two years before it disintegrated due to weak and inexperienced elected officials who were unable to pass legislation, and a deep split over the issue of slavery.

== Asian targets ==
Asian xenophobia in the United States has at least 100 years of history.

=== Anti-Chinese ===
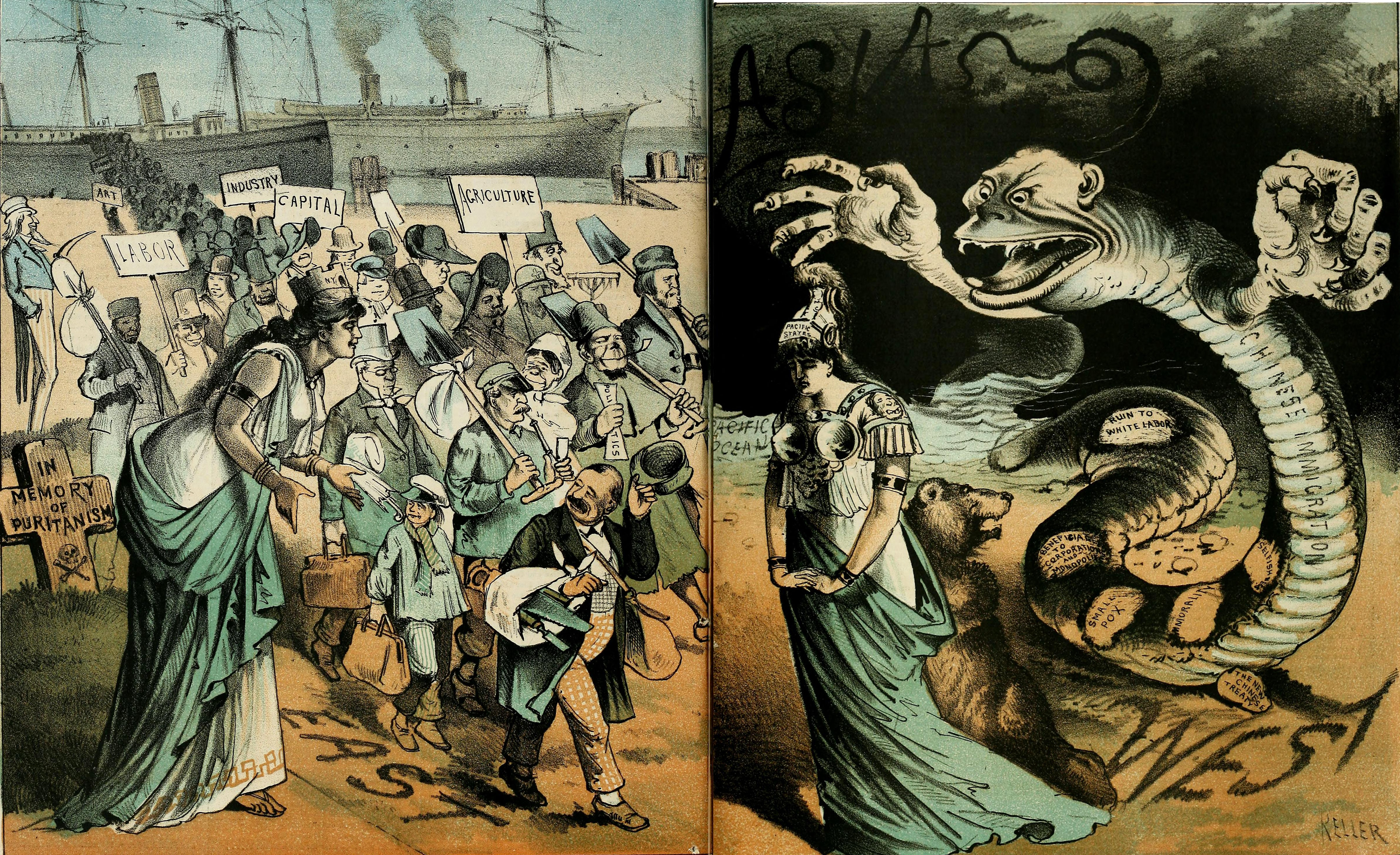
Comparison of European immigrants, represented in the left panel as virtues, while Chinese immigrants are represented by a serpent representing maladies, The Wasp (San Francisco), Vol. 7, 1881

In the 1870s and 1880s in the Western states, ethnic Whites especially Irish Americans targeted violence against Chinese workers, driving them out of smaller towns. They relocated into districts of a few larger cities called "Chinatowns." Denis Kearney, an immigrant from Ireland, led a mass movement in San Francisco in the 1870s that incited racist attacks on the Chinese there and threatened public officials and railroad owners. The Chinese Exclusion Act of 1882 was the first of many nativist acts of Congress which attempted to limit the flow of immigrants into the U.S.. The Chinese responded to it by filing false claims of American birth, enabling thousands of them to immigrate to California. The exclusion of the Chinese caused the western railroads to begin importing Mexican railroad workers in greater numbers ("traqueros"). In 1943 when China was an ally against Japan, the restrictions were repealed and Chinese could become citizens.

=== Anti-Japanese ===
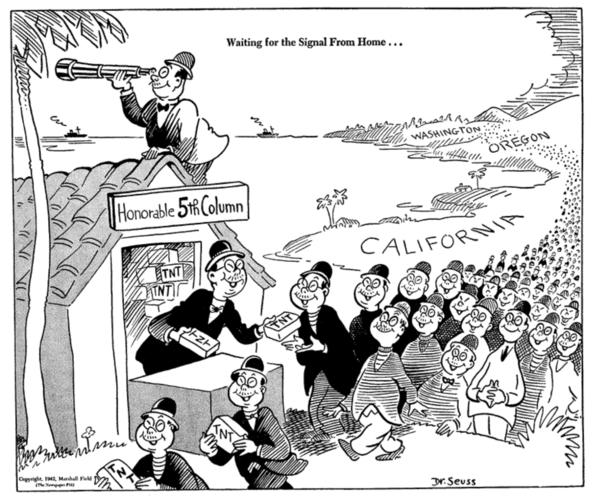
Political cartoon by Dr. Seuss depicting Japanese Americans as sleeper agents ready to attack the United States from within following the attack on Pearl Harbor

Attacks on the Japanese in the Western U.S., echoing the dreaded Yellow Peril became increasingly xenophobic after the unexpected Japanese triumph over the supposedly powerful Russian Empire in the Russo-Japanese War of 1904-1905. In October, 1906, the San Francisco Board of Education passed a regulation whereby children of Japanese descent would be required to attend racially segregated and separate schools. At the time, Japanese immigrants made up 1% of the state's population; many of them had come under the treaty in 1894 which had assured free immigration from Japan. In 1907, nativists rioted up and down the West Coast demanding exclusion of Japanese immigrants and imposition of segregated schools for Caucasian and Japanese students.

The California Alien Land Law of 1913 was specifically created to prevent land ownership among Japanese citizens who were residing in the state of California. In 1918 courts ruled that American-born children had the right to own land. California proceeded to strengthen its Alien land law in 1920 and 1923 and other states followed.

According to Gary Y. Okihiro, the Japanese government subsidized Japanese writers in America especially Kiyoshi Kawakami and Yamato Ichihashi to refute the hostile stereotypes and establish a favorable image of Japanese in the American mind. Thus Kawakami's books especially Asia at the Door (1914) and The Real Japanese Question (1921) tried to refute the false accusations. The publicists confronted the main allegations regarding lack of assimilation, and boasted of the positive Japanese contributions to American economy and society, especially in Hawaii and California.

During World War II, the United States forcibly relocated and interned at least 120,000 people of Japanese descent in 75 identified incarceration sites after Imperial Japan's attack on Pearl Harbor in 1941 and the United States subsequent declaration of war on Japan. Most lived on the Pacific Coast, in internment camps in the western interior of the country. Approximately two-thirds of the inmates were United States citizens. These actions were initiated by president Franklin D. Roosevelt via an executive order shortly after Imperial Japan's attack on Pearl Harbor.

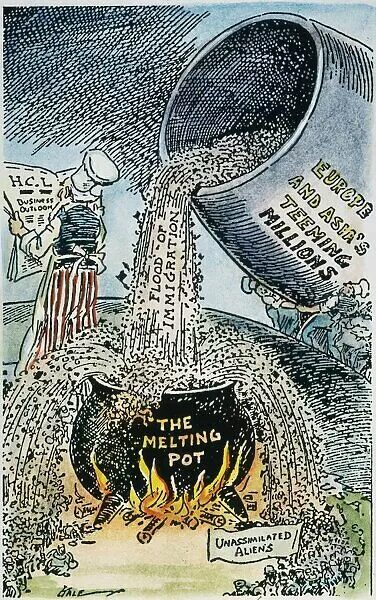
Editorial cartoon warning against unrestricted immigration Los Angeles Times Nov 14 1920 by E W Gale

=== Anti-Filipino ===
The American colonization of the Philippines instigated the immigration of many Filipinos to America, either as pensionados, who came to further their education, or as laborers, who worked in Hawaiian plantations, California farms, and the Alaska fishing industry.

Ethnic discrimination towards Filipinos in America was evident during the American colonial period in the Philippines. Filipino immigrants suffered from wider anti-Oriental prejudice present in America at the time, often confused with the Chinese and Japanese immigrants that had preceded them. Filipinos were perceived to be taking the jobs of white Americans. They were accused of attracting white women which led to the passing of an anti-miscegenation law. These interactions between Filipino men and white women were facilitated in part by the taxi dance halls, often visited by the migrant population, during the 1920s. These were merely racial prejudices. Filipino immigrants in America were affected by various socio-economic factors. The majority of Filipino immigrants of that era were men. The gender ratio of Filipino males to females in California then was approximately 14 to 1. Filipino workers were forced to live in poor conditions since they were poorly paid.

The first documented incident occurred on New Year's Eve 1926, in Stockton, when Filipinos were stabbed and beaten. These anti-Filipino attacks increased with the Great Depression. Thus, the Stockton 1926 attack was not the last: in November 1927, Filipinos were attacked in Yakima Valley, Washington; in September 1928, Filipinos were attacked in Wenatchee Valley, Washington; in October 1929, Filipinos were attacked in Exeter, California; and in January 1930, Filipinos were attacked in Watsonville, California, during the Watsonville Riots, leading to the death of Fermin Tobera. In Stockton's Little Manila, the Filipino Federation of America building was bombed. In the context of these rising tensions, the government felt compelled to act. Firstly, at a regional level, as the state legislature of California declared Filipinos to be a threat to racial stability. Action at a national level followed in 1934, as Congress passed the Tydings-McDuffie Act. This paved the way for the later independence of the Philippines and effectively halted large-scale Filipino migration to the United States.

World War II was a significant turning point for American views towards Filipinos. During the early period of the war, Filipinos were prohibited to join the army. However, in 1942, President Franklin Roosevelt allowed Filipinos to serve in the armed forces. During the war, many Filipinos fought with Americans in Asia and Europe, while some opted to be civilians involved in mobilization efforts. The United States recognized and affirmed the Filipinos' right to citizenship with the amended Nationality Act of 1940. Through the amendment, non-citizens who joined the military were given opportunity to attain citizenship. About ten thousand Filipinos became American citizens through the amendment.

In the 1990s, Filipino Americans in Alaska were depicted negatively in the media, often as liabilities and associated with gang violence. In the 2000s, Filipino American students in California were often stereotyped as lazy delinquents who were not encouraged to pursue college.

== Emergency Quota Act ==
The Emergency Quota Act, also known as the Emergency Immigration Act of 1921, the Immigration Restriction Act of 1921, the Per Centum Law, and the Johnson Quota Act (ch. 8, 42 Stat. 5 of May 19, 1921), was formulated mainly in response to the large influx of Southern and Eastern Europeans and restricted their immigration to the United States. Although intended as temporary legislation, it "proved, in the long run, the most important turning-point in American immigration policy" because it added two new features to American immigration law: numerical limits on immigration and the use of a quota system for establishing those limits, which came to be known as the National Origins Formula.

The Emergency Quota Act restricted the number of immigrants admitted from any country annually to 3% of the number of residents from that country living in the United States as of the 1910 Census. That meant that people from Northern and Western Europe had a higher quota and were more likely to be admitted to the US than those from Eastern or Southern Europe or from non-European countries.

The act was revised by the Immigration Act of 1924.

== Trump administration ==
"Stopping" people
you have nothing in common with

And if you don't stop people that you've never seen before, that you have nothing in common with, your country is going to fail. ... This double-tailed monster [of green energy and immigration] destroys everything in its wake, and they cannot let that happen any longer. You're doing it because you want to be nice, you want to be politically correct, and you're destroying your heritage.

— President Donald Trump
to the UN General Assembly,
September 23, 2025

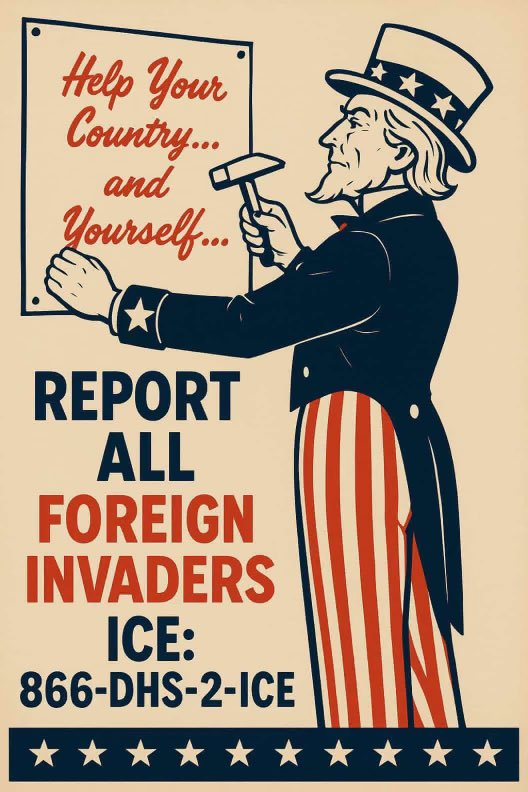
An anti-immigrant World War II-style propaganda poster posted by Homeland Security on June 11, 2025, telling readers to report "foreign invaders" to ICE that was previously posted by far-right accounts.

Immigration policy, including illegal immigration to the United States, was a signature issue of President Donald Trump's first presidential campaign, and his proposed reforms and remarks about this issue generated much publicity. Trump has repeatedly said that illegal immigrants are criminals. Critics have argued that there is an increasing amount of evidence that immigration does not correlate with higher crime rates.

A hallmark promise of his campaign was the construction of much expanded Mexico–United States border wall on the United States–Mexico border and to force Mexico to pay for the wall. Trump has also expressed support for a variety of "limits on legal immigration and guest-worker visas", including a pause on granting green cards, which Trump says will lower immigration levels to historical averages.

As president, Trump imposed a travel ban that prohibited issuing visas to citizens of seven largely-Muslim countries expanded to thirteen in 2020. In response to legal challenges he revised the ban twice, with his third version being upheld by the Supreme Court in June 2018.

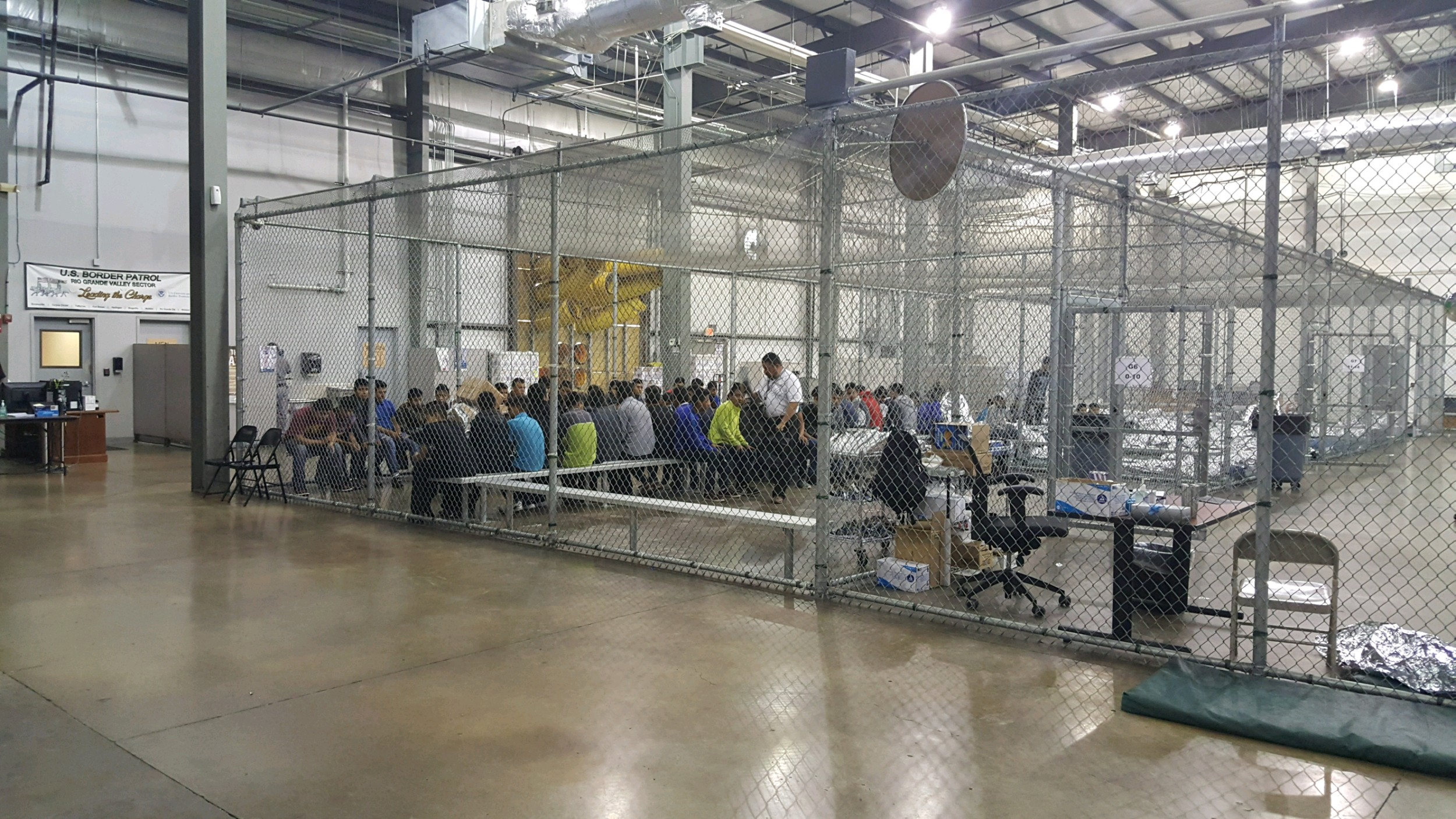
Children sitting within a wire mesh compartment in the Ursula detention facility in McAllen, Texas, June 2018

He attempted to end the Deferred Action for Childhood Arrivals program, but a legal injunction has allowed the policy to continue while the matter is the subject of legal challenge. He imposed a "zero tolerance" policy to require the arrest of anyone caught illegally crossing the border, which resulted in separating children from their families.

Trump's position was strongly supported by conservative voters. Studies found the higher voters' xenophobia was, the higher was their support for political violence.

== Current status ==
A network of more than 300 US-based civil rights and human rights organizations stated in a 2010 report that "Discrimination permeates all aspects of life in the United States, and it extends to all communities of color." Discrimination against racial, ethnic, and religious minorities is widely acknowledged, especially in the case of Indians, Muslims, Sikhs as well as other ethnic groups.

Members of every major American ethnic and religious minority group have perceived discrimination in their dealings with members of other minority racial and religious groups. Philosopher Cornel West has stated that "racism is an integral element within the very fabric of American culture and society. It is embedded in the country's first collective definition, enunciated in its subsequent laws, and imbued in its dominant way of life."

A 2019 survey by the Pew Research Center suggested that 76% of black and Asian respondents had experienced some form of discrimination, at least from time to time. Studies from PNAS and Nature have found that during traffic stops, officers spoke to black men in a less respectful tone than they did to white men and that black drivers are more likely to be pulled over and searched by police than white drivers. Black people are also reportedly overrepresented as criminals in the media. In 2020 the COVID-19 epidemic was often blamed on China, leading to attacks on Chinese Americans. This represents a continuation of xenophobic attacks on Chinese Americans for 150 years.

== See also ==
- Anti-Catholicism in the United States
- Anti-Chinese sentiment in the United States
- Anti-French sentiment in the United States
- Anti-Japanese sentiment in the United States
- Antisemitism in the United States
- Definitions of whiteness in the United States
- Great replacement in the United States
- History of homeland security in the United States
- Immigration reduction in the United States
- Islamophobia in the United States
- Nativism in United States politics
- Racism against African Americans
- Religious discrimination in the United States
- White genocide conspiracy theory
