= Imperial Valley lettuce strike of 1930 =

1930 labor strike by farmworkers in California's Imperial Valley

- Date: January 1–23, 1930
- Location: Imperial Valley, California, United States
- Caused by: Low wages, wage theft by labor contractors, poor working conditions
- Goals: $0.50/hour wage, eight-hour workday with overtime pay, minimum four-hour guarantee, end to racial discrimination
- Methods: Strike action, picketing
- Result: Defeat for strikers; no demands met; organizers arrested and imprisoned

Parties
Mexican Mutual Aid Society (Sociedad Mutualista Mexicana); Trade Union Unity League (TUUL); Agricultural Workers Industrial League (AWIL)	Imperial Valley lettuce growers; Imperial County law enforcement; Imperial Valley Chamber of Commerce

Lead figures
Frank Waldron; Harry Harvey; Tsuji Horiuchi	

Number
~5,000 farmworkers	

Casualties and losses
Multiple arrests; organizers imprisoned	

The Imperial Valley lettuce strike of 1930 was a strike by agricultural workers against lettuce growers in California's Imperial Valley. Beginning on January 1, 1930, Mexican and Filipino lettuce pickers in Brawley walked off their jobs in a spontaneous protest against declining wages and poor working conditions. Within a week, roughly 5,000 workers across the valley had joined the strike, making it one of the largest farmworker actions in California up to that time. The strike ended on January 23 without any of the workers' demands being met, following police raids on organizers and internal divisions among the strike's leadership.

Although the strike itself was a defeat, historians have characterized it as a pivotal moment in California farm labor history. It was the first major multiethnic farmworker strike in the Imperial Valley and helped launch a decade of agricultural labor militancy across the state.

== Background ==
By the late 1920s, persons of Mexican descent made up roughly one-third of Imperial County's population and constituted approximately ninety percent of the agricultural labor force in the Imperial Valley. Filipino workers formed the second-largest group of agricultural laborers in the region. Growers routinely exploited ethnic divisions between their workers, cutting the wages of one group while telling them the other had agreed to work for less.

Working conditions in the valley were severe. Under the prevailing contract system, labor contractors withheld twenty-five percent of workers' total wages as a guarantee against the season's pickings. Workers were paid only for actual picking time, meaning that if weather delayed the harvest or supplies ran out, they waited in the fields unpaid. Contractors sometimes absconded with the final payment from growers, leaving workers stranded without their last week's wages or the portion withheld over the season.

=== Unionization and the 1928 cantaloupe strike ===
In April 1928, discontented agricultural workers formed the Imperial Valley Workers Union, which soon changed its name to the Mexican Mutual Aid Society (Sociedad Mutualista Mexicana). Workers appealed to Mexican consul Carlos Ariza for help resolving their wage claims, and Ariza encouraged the union to formalize itself as an organization that could negotiate on members' behalf. Within a month the society had enrolled twelve hundred members, opened offices in four Imperial Valley towns, and submitted its first petition to growers through the local Chamber of Commerce, requesting a wage increase for cantaloupe workers.

In May 1928, cantaloupe pickers struck, but the action was quickly broken through mass arrests and intimidation by local law enforcement under Imperial County sheriff Charles L. Gillett. The experience demonstrated both the willingness of farmworkers to organize and the lengths to which growers and local authorities would go to suppress labor actions. The Mexican Mutual Aid Society survived the 1928 defeat and continued to represent workers' interests in the valley.

== The strike begins ==
On January 1, 1930, several hundred Mexican and Filipino lettuce workers in Brawley walked off their jobs in a spontaneous protest against declining wages and what they regarded as intolerable working conditions. The walkout occurred at the peak of the winter lettuce harvest, when the valley's growers were most vulnerable to a work stoppage. Within days, approximately 5,000 workers across the Imperial Valley had joined the strike. Workers of other ethnic backgrounds, including Chinese, Japanese, Punjabi, African American, Puerto Rican, and white farmworkers, also participated in the action, making it a broad multiethnic coalition.

The Mexican Mutual Aid Society moved to lead the strike, seeking a negotiated settlement with the growers. The society favored a moderate approach, attempting to work through the Chamber of Commerce to secure higher wages and improved conditions. However, the growers refused to negotiate, and the strike began to lose momentum.

== Communist involvement ==
With the strike faltering, organizers affiliated with the Communist-led Trade Union Unity League (TUUL) saw an opportunity to revive the movement. The TUUL sent three organizers to the valley: Frank Waldron, Harry Harvey, and Tsuji Horiuchi. They quickly assumed leadership of the strike from the Mexican Mutual Aid Society and established a local affiliate, the Agricultural Workers Industrial League (AWIL). The TUUL gained its strongest following among Filipino workers, who formed one of the most militant sections of the valley workforce.

Under AWIL leadership, the strikers formulated a specific set of demands: a fifty-cent hourly wage, a guaranteed minimum of four hours' pay per day, an eight-hour workday with time-and-a-half for overtime, and an end to discrimination based on gender or race.

== Collapse of the strike ==
The shift to Communist leadership fractured the strike coalition. The Mexican Mutual Aid Society, which had lost control of the movement to the TUUL organizers, began working against the strike. According to Bronfenbrenner, the society withheld its support, threatened Mexican workers with deportation, and offered promises of "free land" in Mexico to those who would abandon the strike and return voluntarily—promises that were never honored.

The decisive blow came when law enforcement raided the strikers' meeting places. On January 21, AWIL organizers supporting the strike were arrested and subjected to harsh interrogation. Further raids followed over the next two days. Facing the combined opposition of the growers, local authorities, and the Mexican Mutual Aid Society, the remaining strike leaders called off the action on January 23.

== Aftermath ==
The strike ended after twenty-three days without any of the workers' demands being met. Workers returned to the fields under the same conditions they had protested, while those who refused risked deportation. In the months that followed, authorities continued to pursue Communist organizers in the valley. In April 1930, police raided a meeting of over one hundred workers in El Centro and arrested 108 people; many Mexican workers among them were deported, and several organizers, including Carl Sklar and Tsuji Horiuchi, were convicted under the California Criminal Syndicalism Act and sentenced to lengthy prison terms at Folsom State Prison.

The failure of the 1930 strike temporarily crippled Communist-led organizing efforts in the Imperial Valley. The TUUL did not attempt another major agricultural strike in the region until the 1934 Imperial Valley strike, when organizers from the Cannery and Agricultural Workers' Industrial Union returned to find conditions even worse, with wages as low as ten cents an hour.

Despite its immediate failure, historians have emphasized the strike's longer-term significance. Elizabeth Sine has argued that the 1930 strike represented the crystallization of an "oppositional multiracialism" among Imperial Valley farmworkers, in which workers of different ethnic backgrounds forged solidarity across the racial boundaries that growers had used to divide them. The strike helped inaugurate a decade of farmworker militancy in California's fields, contributing to a tradition of agricultural labor organizing that continued through the 1933 cotton strikes and beyond.

== See also ==
- Cantaloupe strike of 1928
- Imperial Valley farmworkers' strike of 1934
- Salinas Lettuce strike of 1934
- California agricultural strikes of 1933
- Trade Union Unity League
- United Farm Workers
