= Benevolent Assimilation (book) =

1982 book by Stuart Creighton Miller

Benevolent Assimilation: The American Conquest of the Philippines, 1899-1903
- Author: Stuart Creighton Miller
- Subject: History
- Genre: Non-fiction
- Publisher: Yale University Press
- Publication date: 1982
- Media type: Print
- Pages: 340 pp
- ISBN: 978-0-300-02697-9
- OCLC: 433328792

Benevolent Assimilation: The American Conquest of the Philippines, 1899-1903 is a nonfiction book documenting the history of the Philippine–American War by Stuart Creighton Miller (1927–2010), a professor at San Francisco State University, published in 1982 by Yale University Press. The title refers to US President William McKinley's "Benevolent Assimilation" proclamation of December 21, 1898, which used that term to characterize the US occupation and administration of the entire group of the Philippine Islands, which were in their early stages after the cession of sovereignty by Spain to the US in the 1898 Treaty of Paris.

== Reception ==
- The New York Times wrote, "Benevolent Assimilation is the most thorough, balanced and well-written study to date of America's imperial adventure in the western Pacific and the most persuasive analysis of the varied reactions of the American people to the military subjugation of the Filipinos."
- The magazine Asia wrote: "A triumph of research, synthesis and storytelling, this is the wisest book on its subject and, implicitly, a significant cultural critique of the United States at the turn of the 20th century."
- The Journal of American History wrote: "Written with clarity and argued with passion from a wealth of primary sources."
- Library Journal wrote: "The author’s balanced summary of the historiography of imperialism and the epilogue, which considers the Philippine/Vietnam analogy, are valuable features of the work...Should remain the definitive account of these events."

== See also ==
- Philippine–American War
