= Salinas Lettuce strike of 1934 =

1934 strike in Salinas Valley, California, U.S.

- Date: August 27, 1934 - September 24, 1934
- Goals: Better pay and working conditions

Parties
Filipino Labor Union	California Processors and Growers

The Salinas California lettuce strike of 1934 ran from August 27 to September 24, 1934, in the Salinas Valley of California. This strike of lettuce cutters and shed workers was begun and largely maintained by the recently formed Filipino Labor Union and came to highlight ethnic discrimination and union repression. Acts of violence from both frustrated workers and vigilante bands threatened the strike's integrity.

== Filipino field workers: background to the Salinas lettuce strike ==
=== US takes possession of the Philippines and increased immigration to US 1898 - 1934 ===
In 1898, the United States of America took over colonial possession of the Philippines from Spain. The Filipinos, now under an American operated school system, became infatuated with the idea of the United States as a place of opportunity for them. The US passed the 1882 Chinese Exclusion Act and restricted labor availability further with the Asian Exclusion Act statute of the Immigration Act of 1924, demanded a new source of cheap labor. As U.S. nationals, the Filipinos were exempt from immigration laws that kept most other Asians, namely the Chinese and Japanese, out and they began flooding in to fill the void. Most of these immigrants were single men with limited education, usually high school, between the ages of 18 and 25. Many of these young men sought to work part-time while also earning an education in hopes of achieving the American Dream like so many immigrants before them.

=== Filipino agricultural workers and discrimination ===
However, the Filipino workers quickly realized they were being involved in a dual labor system, one in which they were hired for the least desirable jobs and heavily discriminated against. Many were forced into the fields and canneries along the West Coast. Additionally, laws were affected to forbid Filipino women from immigrating to the United States and in some rural cities it was considered a crime for Filipino men to consort with women. Many bosses had hoped to keep expenses lower in employing a more flexible workforce of bachelors. The discontent among Filipinos became aggravated even further with the coming of the Great Depression, which caused competition for jobs to become even more difficult due to the influx of displaced white workers coming from the Dust Bowl region in search of work. Those lucky enough to find work were met with steep wage cuts.

=== The Filipino Labor Union ===
Difficulties in receiving fair wages or working conditions and the desire to combat discrimination were some of the earliest reasons Filipinos began to demand union representation. Labor organizing often fell to labor contractors, middleman between the growers and the workers. While some of these contractors exploited the Filipinos and drove wages down lower, others were instrumental in the creation of unions. By 1935, there were seven individual Filipino labor unions along the West Coast, one of whom was the Filipino Labor Union (FLU).

The Filipino Labor Union was first organized in Salinas, California in 1933 and was founded by D. L. Marcuelo, a businessman from Stockton, California. As president of the Filipino Businessmen’s Protective Association in 1930, Marcuelo urged labor contractors and workers to unite in action or else be replaced by cheaper labor. Thus, the first leaders of the FLU were labor contractors who worked with the rank-and-file members to develop the union’s organization. There was no formal constitution for the union, nor did they hold formal elections for leadership positions. Democratic elements did exist, however, in that the workers were able to choose strike committees and impact union office elections through campaigns. In the start of 1933, Union membership was approximately 2,000 members and grew to approximately 4,000 by 1934. While membership was impressive, the FLU was not necessarily always successful due to the escalating fears of ethnic radicalism.

== 1934 Salinas lettuce strike ==
The fledgling FLU tested its strength in calling for a strike against local growers for better wages in August 1933. While a strong 700 members engaged in the one-day protest, it was broken when Mexican, White, and other Asian laborers came to replace the Filipinos. This protest highlighted the issue of ethnic disunity in the Salinas region and the powerlessness of isolated unions to act effectively. However, these complications were lessened with the passage of the National Industrial Recovery Act. Containing a clause on collective bargaining, this New Deal legislation demanded the recognition of all authorized unions. Prior to this, the American Federation of Labor (AFL) had frowned upon cooperating with the FLU and other ethnic unions, seeing them as a threat to their image. With the passage of this act and the validation of the FLU, the local AFL affiliate in Salinas, the Vegetable Packers Association (VPA) declared that they would collaborate with the FLU to progress workers rights. As a collective, the VPA and FLU saw an opportunity to force the local growers into bargaining. On 27 August 1934, they began the Salinas lettuce strike with a coalition of primarily white and Filipino workers in Monterey County. Of the approximately 7,000 workers who became involved in the strike, almost half were Filipinos.

The key aim of the FLU in the strike was to be recognized by employers as a bona fide union a wage increase from 40 to 55 cents an hours, which was lauded as preposterous by the growers who argued they should only be paying 30 cents given the supply of labor. Both parties were firm in their beliefs, and when it came time for proposed mediations, the increasingly frustrated FLU refused. As a result, on September 1, 1934, Joe Carey, an AFL representative, stated that the FLU needed to respect and experienced leadership of the AFL or continue the strike alone. Insulted, the Filipino leaders moved to continue the strike without their recently gained support network. With this return to independence, riots began to unfold.

As Monterey County had no anti-picketing measures, the FLU organized demonstrations that often affected the productivity of growers and packing sheds. These actions led to increased acts of violence against Filipinos. Reports of mobs attacking Filipino workers became more common, and police often arrested FLU leadership, such as president D. L. Marcuelo, for encouraging pickets. Despite the union’s stance against violence, Filipinos begin to fight back and the situation worsened. Racial tensions raged as the strike continued and the media became increasingly hostile toward the Filipinos and their sympathizers. Newspapers would reflect the hostilities with negativity and place the blame on the stubborn and aggressive FLU. This negative sentiment was furthered when the VPA publicly spoke out against he FLU and the AFL criticized the leadership for advocating violence. Even local branches within the FLU began to turn their backs to union solidarity and discontinue participation in the strike. Regardless, the FLU begrudgingly remained committed to a lengthy strike. They were spurred and motivated by increasingly influential leadership, such as in one of the founders of the union named Rufo Canete. He was a labor contractor from Salinas who encouraged adhering to the strike and adapting pickets to drive by fields in vehicles.

Despite the increased surge in able-bodied leadership membership in the FLU began to decline even further, especially after the VPA began to send members back to work. With the FLU holding tight as the last group to continue the strike, packs of organized vigilantes grew extremely violent. They would beat Filipino men walking on the streets and, armed with their guns, would chase picketers away from sheds and fields. Vigilante activity spread beyond Salinas itself, moving to surrounding agricultural areas in a series of riots on September 10–11. The police forces had remained neutral until growers ordered them to act against the FLU members for violating the Criminal syndicalism laws that prohibited the advocating of any change to economic or political systems. Salinas Police forces and the local Highway Patrol began to arrest Filipinos in excess, targeting leaders and organizers most heavily. Frustrations amongst Filipinos grew and grew, and it often worked its way out in the beating of fellow Filipinos who crossed the strike lines. Tensions soared and the mob mentality for both local thugs and Filipinos workers became dominating.

=== Rufo Canete and the Filipino Labor Union ===
The escalating violence reached its climax on September 21, 1934. Rufo Canete was reappointed as the FLU’s president, and hopes once again arose, as he was a respected leader and friend to many white businessmen and citizens. He organized a strike committee to oversee the strike stayed on course and announced a day of Unity with an agreement between the Filipinos and the Mexican Labor Union. Fear among growers returned, as a merge between the two largest ethnic groups in the area would have a devastating effect on their labor pool. So the next night, a large mob of vigilantes raided and burned down Canete’s labor camp, a key organizational center for the FLU and home to hundreds of Filipino workers. Immediately after the burning of the camp, vigilante groups drove approximately 800 Filipinos from the Salinas Valley at gunpoint. Following this sequence of events, Canete saw the extent to which the mob climate posed a danger to Filipino workers. On Monday September 24, 1934, the strike officially ended under advisement by Canete and approval by the FLU strike committee.

== Aftermath of the 1934 Salinas lettuce strike ==
Within two days of the strike’s closure, Filipino workers returned once more to the lettuce fields and packing sheds. Settlement was reached after negotiating with the growers, and awarded the FLU two of their main demands. There was to be a wage increase to 40 cents an hour and the FLU was to be recognized as a legitimate union for farm workers. However, the victory was a hollow one for the FLU itself. All of the violence that had occurred through the course of the strike was attributed to the stubbornness and refusal of the union to negotiate. Ethnic tensions and discrimination continued in the Salinas region, and beliefs in the aggressiveness of minorities were reinforced in the minds of many locals. Moreover, many dissatisfied members of the FLU left the union and joined rival unions and contractors instead.

The 1934 Lettuce Strike is often remembered by its use of violence and intimidation tactics. However, it also left a lasting legacy in highlighting the growing strength of ethnic labor movements during the Great Depression. Filipinos were some of the first to provide a legitimate challenged to the growers and their restriction of agricultural unionization for minorities in the region. It was also the first time any Filipino union or organization had been able to come to an agreement with employers and be recognized as an authoritative body. Participation in the strike gave Filipinos experience in labor participation that they would put to use in future conflicts throughout the Great Depression.

== See also ==
- Watsonville Riots
- History of Filipino Americans
- Salinas, California
- Imperial Valley lettuce strike of 1930

== Notes ==
=== References ===
- Anthony, Donald E. (1932). "Filipino Labor in Central California". Sociology and Social Research. 16: 149–156.
- Bauken, Manual (1948). I Have Lived with the American People. Idaho.
- Chaffee, Porter M. (1937). Unionization of Filipinos in California Agriculture. Oakland, CA: Federal Writers' Project.
- Dewitt, Howard A. (1978). "The Filipino Labor Union: The Salinas Lettuce Strike of 1934". Amerasia Journal. 5 (2): 1–21. doi:10.17953/amer.5.2.65n03n2ru0x63026.
- Jamieson, Stuart Marshal (1976). Labor Unionism in American Agriculture. New York: Arno Press.
- Ngai, Mae M. (2002). "From Colonial Subject to Undesirable Alien: Filipino Migration, Exclusion, and Repatriation 1920–1940". In Josephine Lee; Imogene Lim; Yuko Matsukawa (eds.). Re/collecting Early Asian America: Essays in Cultural History. Philadelphia, PA: Temple University Press. pp. 111–126. ISBN 978-1-56639-964-7.
