= Yakima Valley riots =

1927 riots in Washington, USA

The Yakima Valley riots were an expression of anti-Filipino sentiment that took place in the Yakima Valley of Washington (state) from November 8–11 in 1927. This riot took the homes and jobs lives of many Filipinos in the area. Unable to receive help or protection from the white police, Filipinos were easy targets for radicalized and angered whites who saw them as thieves of their women and jobs. Under the cover of darkness, and occasionally during the daytime, mobs of white men would harass, threaten, and beat innocent Filipinos for no other reason than their presence.

In the late 1920s anti-Asian sentiment in the US grew, culminating in the Immigration Act of 1924. Unlike other Asian groups at the time, Filipinos were permitted in the country as a result of the US Colonization of the Philippines, and although they were legal residents, they still faced a great deal of discrimination. Many of these workers found jobs in Eastern Washington on the numerous farms in the area. At the same time the Ku Klux Klan had been exploiting this existing anti-Asian sentiment with the residents of the valley, claiming to protect white women from the threat of interracial dating, and local men from the source of cheap labor. In November 1927 this culminated in a series of intimidation and threats by the KKK in the valley. Beginning the night of November 8, a mob gathered at a local boarding house owned by an interracial couple, demanding all Filipino boarders leave town. Throughout the week Filipino workers were threatened with death if they did not leave the valley. Most were forced onto trains out of town, or simply left on foot. Those who remained were put into the county jail for their own protection. Overall hundreds of Filipinos were forced out of the valley as a result of the riot, which was finally ended November 11. In the aftermath of the incident, the local leaders were arrested and put on trial, eventually being found guilty by an all white jury and sentenced to 10 days in jail.

== Background ==
The first Filipinos to move to the United States were mostly limited to pensionados, educated young men from privileged families looking to send their sons to university in the U.S. Later, large numbers of Filipinos immigrated to Hawaii to meet labor demand on sugar plantations. Around 64,000 Filipinos immigrated to Hawaii by 1930. Quickly, however, some of these immigrants left Hawaii's strict labor regime in search for other socio-economic opportunities on the U.S. mainland. Filipinos were mass hired at fruit plantations in Washington's Yakima Valley. Employers used this sudden influx of immigrant labor to undercut the wages of the existing laborers, causing resentment among the Valley's existing population that eventually developed into full-blown riots. In the late 1920s, anti-Asian sentiment in the U.S. grew, culminating in the Chinese Exclusion Act of 1924. Unlike other Asian groups at the time, Filipinos were permitted in the country as a result of the US Colonization of the Philippines, and although they were legal residents, they still faced a great deal of discrimination. Many of these workers found jobs in Eastern Washington on the numerous farms in the area. At the same time the Ku Klux Klan had been exploiting this existing anti-Asian sentiment with the residents of the valley, claiming to protect white women from the threat of interracial dating, and local men from the source of cheap labor. Additionally, the "Alien land law" prohibited those ineligible for citizenship to own land, but Yakima natives on the reservation felt exempt from this law, allowing Asians to tend and own their land.

Due to the legal loophole exempting Filipinos from the Exclusion Act and legal segregation, vigilante violence was heavily employed by whites from all classes. Beginning the night of November 8, a mob gathered at a local boarding house owned by an interracial couple, demanding all Filipino boarders leave town. Mobs of white men swarmed into the town of Toppenish, attacking and harassing Filipino workers for two days straight. On the first night, men rushed into homes of Filipinos, injuring residents and destroying houses and furniture. Filipinos were gathered and forced to leave on trains under threat of death. Those who chose to stay were told they would be hanged if found after dark, and were placed in jail under protective custody by police. Filipinos in the Valley were subject to arson and dynamite bombings perpetrated by white vigilante groups who accused Filipinos of "stealing" white women from white men and for cooperating with "barbaric black natives". The Ku Klux Klan in the Valley was led by Tyler A. Rogers, the local Kleagle. The Klan claimed to uphold the law and denied their night-riding approach at justice. They attracted significant support from the Valley's white population due to their outspoken opinions against interracial dating or relationships. Not only were the Filipino laborers harassed and tormented by the KKK, but their employers were threatened and beaten too.

== Results and outcome ==
Most Filipino residents of the Valley were forced onto trains out of town, or simply left on foot. Those who remained were put into the county jail for their own protection. Overall, hundreds of Filipinos were forced out of the Valley as a result of the riot, which was finally ended November 11. In the aftermath of the incident, the local leaders were arrested and put on trial, eventually being found guilty by an all white jury and sentenced to 10 days in jail. Whites who resented the Filipinos pushed for a removal of the Filipinos exemption status from the Exclusion Act. The Tydings-McDuffie Act in 1934 granted the Philippines its independence after a ten year period. This limited Filipino immigration to the United States to 50 people a year, even less than the 100 allotted to Japan and China. To deal with the Filipinos that already came to America, the Filipino Repatriation Act of 1935 was passed, offering a paid one way ticket for Filipinos to return home, as long as they promised never to return. While most fled out of fear and self-preservation, some Filipinos, estimated to be about 25 individuals, stayed to host their annual Rizal celebration.

== Further riots ==
The series of riots in the Yakima Valley only shows a small portion of the violent riots Filipinos faced. After the Yakima tragedies, riots were started in other small farming towns where Filipinos were the main labor force. Exeter and the Watsonville riots are a few of the better known riots that took place after Yakima. These riots were similar in nature to the ones in the Yakima Valley, featuring groups of white men using threats and violence in an attempt to run the Filipinos out of town. Like the Yakima riots, Filipinos were shot, beaten, and killed mercilessly.

== See also ==
- Watsonville riots
- List of incidents of civil unrest in the United States
