= Si Tandang Bacio Macunat =

1885 book

- Author: Miguel Lucio Bustamante
- Language: Tagalog
- Publication date: 1885
- Publication place: Philippines

Si Tandang Bacio Macunat (lit. Old Man Bacio Macunat), alternatively spelled as Si Tandang Basio Macunat, is a work written by Spanish friar, Miguel Lucio Bustamante published in Tagalog in the Spanish Philippines. It is known for its premise which argues that education is undesirable to the 'Indios', and criticizes the pursuit of education by members of the Ilustrado class.

== Characters ==
- Gervasio "Bacio" Macunat – An old farmer whom the narrator of the story meets. The eponymous character lacks ambition and accepts his sociopolitical position as an indio. He is critical of education preferring to remain on his farm working with his carabao. He claims that if he deviates from this expectation it would mean rebelling against God and the King. He is married to Silia with whom he has many children. His father is likewise obedient and a strict person. Bacio narrates an eye-witness account of his father about a indio youth known as Proper to the narrator.
- The Narrator – the character who remains unnamed throughout the story, in an effort to understand society the narrator travels through many towns around Manila meeting Bacio. He is supportive of giving indios access to education.
- Prospero "Proper" – A youth who belongs to a indio middle class family with Andres Baticot and Maria Dimaniuala as his parents. Proper described in a story as a good Christian at the start of the narrative along with his sister, Pili, was sent to Manila for education by the cabeza with his father's consent. He returns to town as a hedonistic and arrogant person as a result of his education in Manila and causes misdeeds which brings tragedy to his family.
- Felicita "Pili" – Proper's sister who worried about the sending of his brother to Manila. She is also the cousin of Bacio's father.

== In Fiction ==
In chapter nine of the novel El Filibusterismo, Hermana Penchang had Juli, the daughter of Cabesang Tales, read Si Tandang Bacio Macunat.
