= Cantaloupe strike of 1928 =

California labor strike

The Cantaloupe strike of 1928 was labor movement of cantaloupe pickers in Imperial Valley, California. On May 7, 1928 cantaloupe pickers walked off of the job and the strike lasted to May 10 of the same year. The strikers had hardly any outside support and many were effectively imprisoned by local police for gathering together in any public space during the strike. The strikers were mostly Mexican immigrants or of Mexican descent because they comprised the vast majority of produce laborers in California, about 3,500 to 4,000 Mexicans worked as cantaloupe pickers. While the strike was short-lived and seemingly unorganized, it stands as a victory for the workers.

== Background ==
=== Mexican immigration ===
Most of the agricultural workers in California at the time were Mexican immigrants. Mexicans had been immigrating to the United States since the mid-1800s, due to Mexico's struggles to maintain its hold on political stability following the rebellion in Texas, which led to the Mexican–American War. Then, by 1852, the population of California had grown from 8,000 in 1848 to 260,000 due to the spark of the California Gold Rush. After much struggle with years of violence, Mexico's inclusion in the civil war, and the Reconstruction Era, several factors contributed to the surge in Mexican labor immigrants. For example, the Chinese Exclusion Act of 1882. This act of the Gilded Age, created a need for a new source of cheap and exploitable labor. This labor shortage was exacerbated in 1917 by the United States entry into World War I. Many Mexicans sought economic opportunities and a seized the opportunity to leave the tumultuous nation during the ongoing Mexican Revolution (1910–1920). “By 1920 Mexicans dominated the valley’s harvest work and, at the time of the 1928 strike, persons of Mexican descent comprised about ninety percent of Imperial County’s labor force”. While Mexican immigrants provided a much needed service for their employers, others were publicly critical of the mass influx of Mexican workers.

=== Anti-immigration ===
In 1928 an immigration bill before Congress would impose strict restrictions on the numbers of immigrants allowed into the United States from Mexico. The Los Angeles Times newspaper reports on Senator Harris’ anti-Mexican fervor. "Harris said he wants Mexican immigration restricted because he considers it 'the least desirable of all immigration'...he predicted that if it is allowed to go on unchecked there will be ten Mexicans to one native-born American in the Southwest within the next 100 years." Senator Harris’ xenophobic and racist statements reflect popular sentiments of the local communities in 1928 that took issue not with the employment of Mexican immigrants, but with the fact that many of these laborers were settling down in the Imperial Valley area. "Although the valley’s Mexican population originally came to the United States as temporary migrants, by 1928 the great bulk of that population had become year-around residents of Imperial County. About twenty thousand people, one-third of the county’s total population, were persons of Mexican descent". The Mexican immigrants were integrating themselves into American society and many people in the United States harbored hostilities towards them for just that fact alone.

=== Unionization ===
Cantaloupe pickers had three main demands for their employers: "better housing conditions, safeguards against defaulting contractors, and proper insurance under the Workmen’s Compensation Act". The major issue was defaulting contractors because the workers were losing their wages. Growers would retain 20 to 25 percent of the workers’ wages, then give the wages to a contractor to hold in trust, to ensure that workers finished out the cantaloupe season. With the grievances mounting and fervent anti-immigration rhetoric in the American discourse, many Mexicans sought labor organization as a solution.

== Strike ==
The workers unionized in order to protect their interests. In April 1928, Mexican workers in California formed the Union of United Workers of the Imperial Valley that boasted a membership of 2,754 workers of Mexican heritage. The union sought a remedy to their grievances, so on May 3, 1928, "they appealed to the Chambers of Commerce in the Valley to act as intermediaries in adjusting their complaints", but it was to no avail. On May 7, Mexican cantaloupe pickers at the Sears Brothers Ranch spontaneously walk-off the jobsite. On May 8, cantaloupe pickers at other Imperial Valley ranches refused to work. According to scholars, there does not seem to have been any pre-planning of the strike by the union, but was a spawned by spontaneous actions of dissatisfied workers that decided to take a stand. Employers feared the loss of profit because of the limited time span of harvesting season, so they enlisted the help of local law enforcement. "The County Board of Supervisors ordered Sheriff Gillett to arrest agitators", which the Sheriff took to mean arrest any Mexicans gathered in public spaces. Sheriff Gillett's exploits left many workers in jail on trumped up charges of vagrancy or disturbing the peace. According to one story, on May 8, "he saw a group of Mexicans gathering outside the county Courthouse...fearing the worst, the sheriff arrested the group, only to discover that it was a delegation of workers invited to discuss the crisis with District Attorney Heald". The Los Angeles Times reported that at least forty eight Mexicans had been arrested by May 10 and the police had shut down pool halls, after another incident involving the ever entertaining and horrible Sheriff Gillett. The newspaper reports that the Sheriff was thrown out of a local pool hall where thousands of Mexican agitators were congregating. However, a patron and witness at the pool hall explained that there were only six people in the establishment and only six that threw him out. With many workers languishing in jail and no organized momentum behind the strike, it died out and pickers returned to work. The strike ended as quickly as it had started, on May 12, 1928. The strike was considered a victory because employers conceded to a wage increase for cantaloupe pickers.

== Aftermath ==
The strike had revived anti-Mexican immigration fervor. Efforts to pass an immigration bill that would put a quota on the number of Mexican immigrants allowed into the United States, were revitalized in Congress. The quota for Mexicans, "would permit entry of approximately 12,000 the first year, 7000 the second year, and 2900 a year thereafter...in the case of Canada...[the bill] would permit 60,000 immigrants a year without any sliding scale or other restrictions". The Mexican produce laborers would soon have to deal with job competition, as well as anti-immigration policies. The dawn of the Great Depression, "created a disastrous drop in wage rates and caused the introduction of hundreds of thousands of Anglo workers into the field-labor market". Anti-immigration policy and job competition culminated in the Mexican Repatriation, where hundreds of thousands of American citizens of Mexican descent and Mexican immigrants were forcefully and unconstitutionally deported to Mexico. Despite the tragedy that befell many of these workers, many scholars suggest that the spontaneous actions of these cantaloupe pickers helped spur other agricultural strikes in California in the 1930s. This isn't the only instance of a culture related strike, others include The Denalo Grape Strike, Salinas Lettuce strike of 1934, Citrus Strike of 1936 and the Salad Bowl strike.
