= Little brown brother =

Slur against Filipino migrants

Little brown brother is a slang term used by Americans to refer to Filipinos during the period of U.S. colonial rule over the Philippines, following the Treaty of Paris between Spain and the United States, and the Philippine–American War. It was coined by William Howard Taft, the first American Governor-General of the Philippines (1901–1904) and later the 27th President of the United States. U.S. military men in the Philippines greeted the term with scorn. The book Benevolent Assimilation recounts that Taft "assured President McKinley that 'our little brown brothers' would need 'fifty or one hundred years' of close supervision 'to develop anything resembling Anglo-Saxon political principles and skills'", and reports that the military greeted Taft's assertion, "that 'Filipinos are moved by similar considerations to those which move other men' with utter scorn".

A 1961 book by Leon Wolff, titled Little Brown Brother and subtitled "How the United States purchased and pacified the Philippine Islands at the century's turn", was awarded the 1962 Francis Parkman Prize by the Society of American Historians as the best-written book in American history that year. A reissued 2001 edition of that book contains accounts of numerous atrocities committed by U.S. soldiers during the Philippine–American War.

Filipino journalist and author Carmen Pedrosa wrote in one of a series of columns for The Philippine Star that the term was not originally intended to be derogatory or an ethnic slur but was a reflection of "paternalist racism" promoted by Theodore Roosevelt.
