= Benevolent assimilation =

US policy towards the Philippines during occupation

Benevolent assimilation refers to a policy of the United States towards the Philippines as described in a proclamation by US president William McKinley that was issued in a memorandum to the U.S. Secretary of War on December 21, 1898, after the signing of the Treaty of Paris, which ended the Spanish–American War. It stated that future control, disposition, and government of the Philippine islands had been ceded to the United States and that the US military government was to be extended over the whole of the ceded territory.

About six months earlier, on June 12, 1898, Emilio Aguinaldo had declared the Philippines to be a free and independent nation and had established a revolutionary government. The Filipino revolutionary armed forces were then deployed and had remained in positions surrounding US Army forces occupying Manila. This juxtaposition eventually developed into a standoff between opposing forces that would erupt in fighting in early 1899 to ignite the Philippine–American War.

The proclamation read in part:

Finally, it should be the earnest wish and paramount aim of the military administration to win the confidence, respect, and affection of the inhabitants of the Philippines by assuring them in every possible way that full measure of individual rights and liberties which is the heritage of free peoples, and by proving to them that the mission of the United States is one of benevolent assimilation substituting the mild sway of justice and right for arbitrary rule.

The proclamation was sent to General Elwell Otis, US military commander and Governor-General in the Philippines. Otis sent Emilio Aguinaldo a version of the proclamation that he had bowdlerized by removing mention of US sovereignty "to stress our benevolent purpose" and not "offend Filipino sensibilities" by substituting "free people" for "supremacy of the United States" and deleting "to exercise future domination." General Otis had also sent an unaltered copy of the proclamation to General Marcus Miller in Iloilo City, who, unaware that an altered version had been sent to Aguinaldo, passed a copy to a Filipino official there. The unaltered version eventually made its way to Aguinaldo.

Otis later explained:

After fully considering the President's proclamation, and the temper of the Taglos, with whom I was daily discussing political problems and the friendly intentions of the U.S.A. Government toward them, I concluded that there were certain words and expressions therein such as "sovereignty," "right of cessation" and those which directed immediate occupation and so forth, which though most admirably employed and tersely expressive of actual conditions, might be advantageously used by the Tagalog. The ignorant classes had been taught to believe that certain words such as "sovereignty," "protection," and so forth had peculiar meanings disastrous to their welfare and significant of future political domination, like that from which they had been recently freed.

== See also ==
- Schurman Commission
- Colonialism
- Racism
