= Commercial fishing in Alaska =

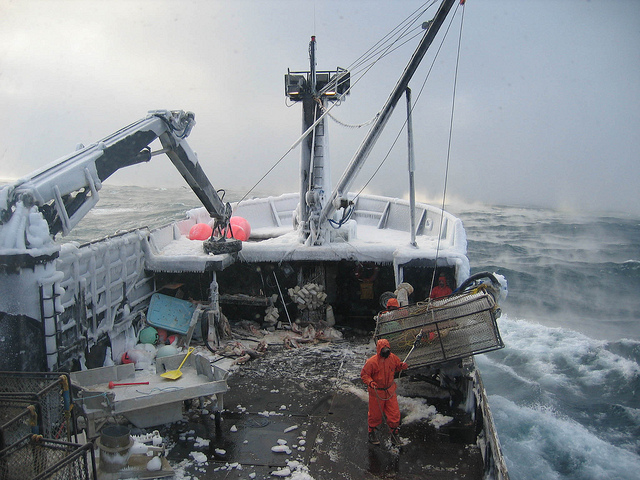
Fishing for crabs in the Bering Sea in January 2006.

Commercial fishing is a major industry and source of employment in Alaska. Alaska Natives have been harvesting salmon and many other types of fish for millennia, including king crab, herring, and cod. Russians came to Alaska to harvest its abundance of sealife, as well as the Japanese and other East Asian peoples.

In the 20th and 21st centuries, the Alaskan fishing industry has come under threat by environmental disasters and climate change. The Exxon Valdez oil spill in Alaska’s Prince William Sound in March 1989 dumped nearly 11 million gallons of crude oil into the surrounding waters, which caused defects in pink salmon and disrupted population growth of multiple species of fish. This led to lower yields, particularly of herring, and job losses in the Alaskan fishing sector. Warming waters in the Pacific Ocean have been cited by the U.S. Geological Survey as a cause of lower productivity in salmon, and has been a persistent issue affecting Alaskan fishing in the 21st century.

== Job safety ==
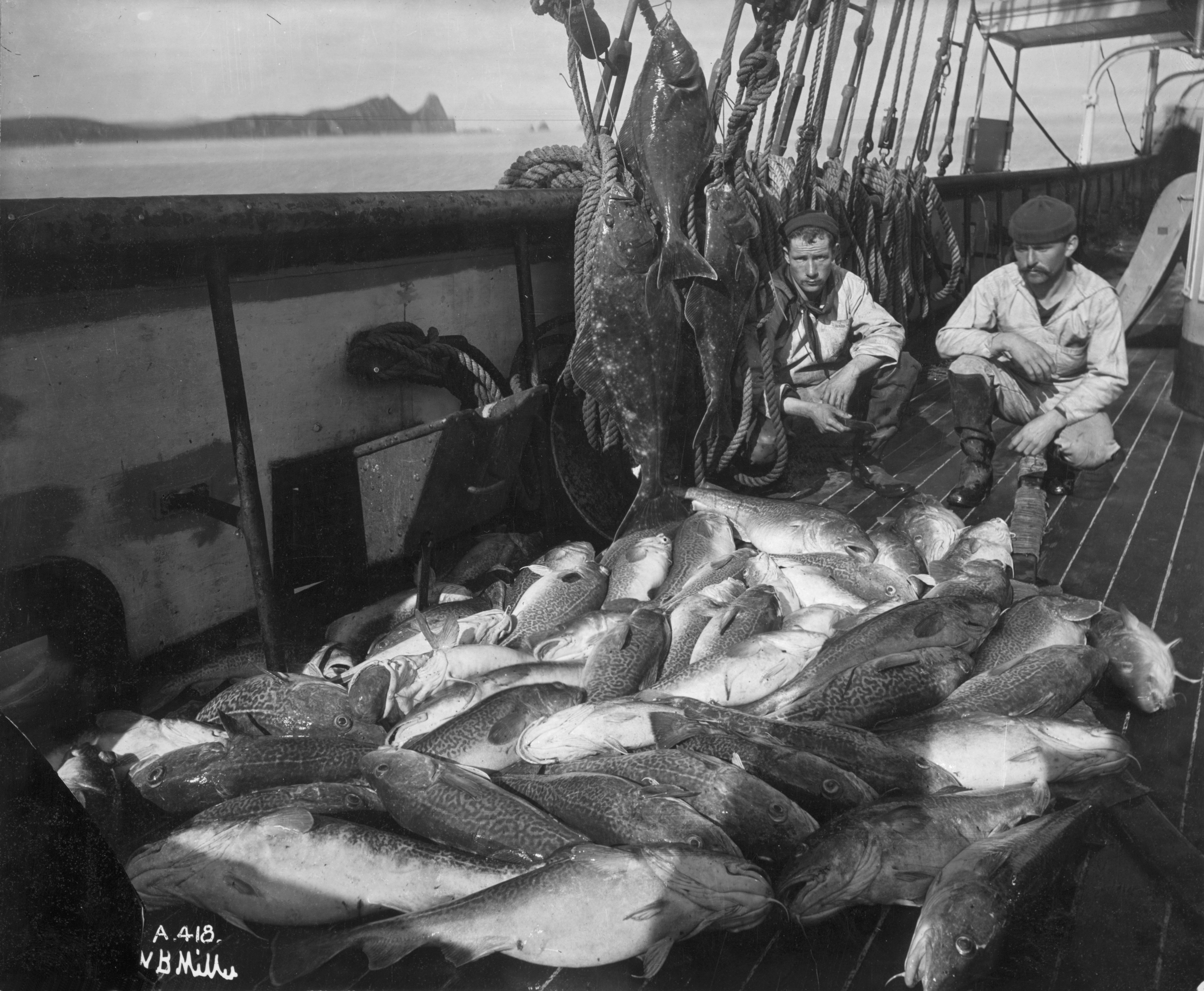
Commercial fishermen in Alaska, early 20th century

Alaska's commercial fishermen work in one of the world's harshest environments. They endure isolated fishing grounds, high winds, seasonal darkness, very cold water, icing, freezing cold temperatures, days upon days away from family, and short fishing seasons, when very long work days are the norm. Fatigue, physical stress, and financial pressures face most Alaska fishermen through their careers. The hazardous work conditions faced by fishermen have a strong impact on their safety. Out of 948 work-related deaths in Alaska during 1990–2006, nearly one-third (311) were deaths of fishermen. This is estimated to be equivalent to an annual fatality rate of 128 per 100,000. That is 26 times the overall U.S. work-related fatality rate of approximately 5 per 100,000. Most of these fatalities are due to vessel disasters which lead to crewmembers drowning. In 1991–1993 alone, 91% of fatalities resulted from drowning. Therefore the use of Personal Flotation Devices (PFD) is recommended. Data for the same period shows a survival rate of 63% for workers who ended up in the water who used PFDs.

While the work-related fatality rate for commercial fishermen in Alaska is still very high, it does appear to be decreasing: since 1990, there has been a 51 percent decline in the annual fatality rate. The successes in commercial fishing are due in part to the U.S. Coast Guard implementing new safety requirements in the early 1990s. These regulations were published on August 14, 1991, and are known as the "Final Rule" entitled "Commercial Fishing Industry Vessel Regulations" These changes were put in place to improve the safety of commercial fishing and the overall work environment in the commercial fishing industry. These regulations cover: stability for fishing vessels, the termination of unsafe operations, safety equipment such as immersion suits and personal flotation devices, survival craft, distress signals, means of escape, and many more requirements that all contributed to the increased survival rate of commercial fishermen. As a result, 96% of the commercial fishermen survived vessel sinkings/capsizings in 2004, whereas in 1991, only 73% survived. Although the number of occupational deaths of commercial fishermen in Alaska have reduced, there is a continuing pattern of losing 20 to 40 vessels every year. There are still about 100 fishermen who must be rescued each year from cold Alaska waters. Proper training, such as participation in a marine safety class for crewmembers, could be the difference between knowing how to survive a vessel disaster and failing to do so. Successful rescue is still dependent on the expertly trained personnel of the U.S. Coast Guard search and rescue operations, and such efforts can be hindered by the harshness of seas and the weather. Furthermore, the people involved in Search and Rescue operations are themselves at considerable risk of injury or death during these rescue attempts.

== Salmon seining in Alaska ==
Purse seine usage in the Alaska salmon fishing industry:

=== Equipment ===
Purse seining is a method of fishing that includes a large net that is used as a barrier to collect a school of fish. A commercial fishing boat, used for purse seining in the Alaskan salmon fishery, is typically between 40 and 58 feet (18 m) long. Toward the bow is a cabin, where the skipper and crew live (typically three to six people). The aft third of the boat consists of a flat deck, with a low rail around it. Amidships are hatch covers, which cover the fish hold, a tank where the fish are placed when caught. The stern is a simple flat area that holds the purse seine when it is out of the water. There are several booms, with various types of pulleys, used for working with the seine, and a deck winch for the same purpose. Shortly after the end of World War II, the modern type trawler for use in Alaska was introduced which could be used for all the various fishing seasons with its own processing ability, including freezing, was introduced, tripling production. After crab season these boats are used as floating factory ships.

There is also a skiff, a small boat used for towing. When not in use, the skiff is usually towed behind the fishing boat, though in rough weather a boom can be used to lift it up and set it on the deck. For long trips where rough weather is likely, the seine will be placed into the fish hold as well, to lower the center of gravity of the vessel and make it safer.

The purse seine itself is usually black in color, with colorful "corks" (floats of some sort) strung along the cork line, and lead weights strung along the lead line. The size and attributes of purse seines are regulated by the Alaska Department of Fish and Game, which oversees the industry. A typical length may be 1,200 feet (370 m) long, by 40 feet (12 m) deep (distance between cork line and lead line). It is stacked on the stern of the fishing boat with the corkline coiled on the port side, and the lead line coiled on the starboard side, with the web taking up the middle. The seine, when piled on board, is about the size of a large pickup truck, and is very heavy as well.

A "set" is a single operation of the purse seine, intended to result in a catch of fish.

=== Personnel ===
The skipper's job is to hire crew, manage all operation of the equipment, find the fish, direct the operation, run the booms, navigate the boat, find a market, sell the fish, and pay the crew.
Skiffman

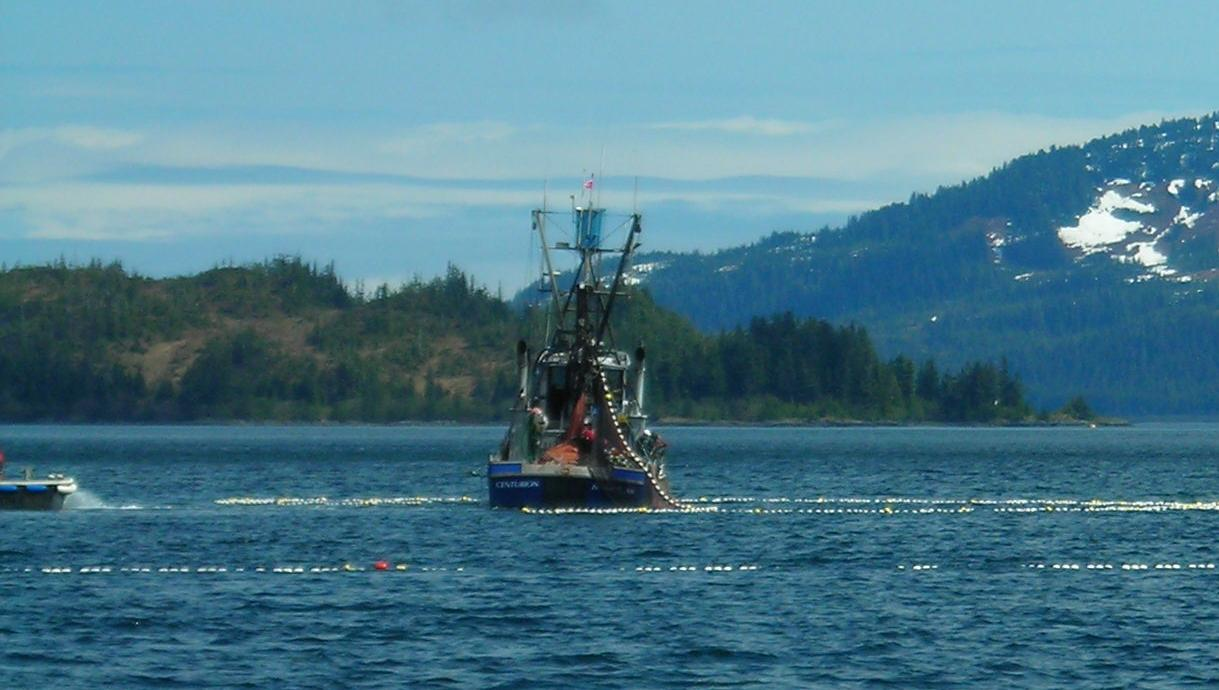
A seiner in the middle of set in Prince William Sound, Alaska

The skiffman has responsibility for the skiff, keeping the fuel tank supplied, maintaining the engine, and driving it around as needed. The skiff is attached to one end of the net when the crew is setting the net. The skiffman is responsible for placement of the net. After the set the skiff and main boat loop. The skiffman hands his end of the net to one of the deck hands. He then swings around the boat and under the net where the other deck hands tosses him a tow line. The skiff man then becomes responsible for the placement of the boat. It is important to keep the net and boat centered. If the tides push the net around the bow then there is a chance of the floats sinking and fish escaping. If there is another boat setting near the boat the skiff man needs to keep his boat and net away from that set. The skipper may signal the skiffman aboard if help is needed to either pull up the bag of fish or "brail" the fish into the fish hole. Brailing is when a large basket is dipped into the pocket of the net and then hauled aboard. This method of getting the fish on board is still used in some parts of Alaska, however, most boats now bring their fish on board by "taking bites".
The deck hands take care of all of the tasks that need to be done on board during a set, such as detaching the skiff at the start of a set, plunging to scare fish away from the boat where they could escape the net by going under the boat, and cleaning the deck of seaweed and bycatch while the net is deployed, keeping an eye on the net and surrounding seas for snags or whales, stacking the cork line and lead line as the net is being taken back aboard, removing the odd fish/debris that has become entangled in the net, assisting with brailing (scooping the fish aboard at the end of a set), repairing holes in the net, pitching the fish into the fish hold, and on most boats cooking the meals.

== Safety and occupational hazards ==
Commercial fishing in Alaska ranks among the most dangerous occupations in the United States, with fatality rates that exceed the national average. Workers face harsh environmental conditions including freezing temperatures, high winds, and rough seas in areas like the Bering Sea. These conditions put crew members at high risk of injury or possible death through the fishing season.

Vessel disasters cause a large share of deaths in the industry. Capsizing, sinking, and collisions happen for a range of reasons. Severe weather, overloaded boats, and equipment breakdowns are common factors. When a vessel goes down fast, crew members often have little time to react. Falling overboard is another major cause of death. Without a personal flotation device, a worker who ends up in cold water faces rapid hypothermia, which can be fatal within minutes. In many cases, limited time to respond reduces the chances of survival.

The work environment on deck presents additional hazards. Fishing vessels rely on heavy machinery such as winches, cranes, and hydraulic equipment. These systems can catch onto clothing or limbs if proper precautions are not followed. Surfaces are often wet and covered in fish residue, increasing the risk of slips and falls. Long working hours contribute to fatigue, which reduces awareness and impairs reaction time. Federal regulations under the Fishing Vessel Safety Act require that exposed gears, belts, and rotating shafts be fitted with protective guards to reduce the risk of injury.

Efforts to improve safety have increased over time. The Alaska Marine Safety Education Association (AMSEA) have provided hands-on survival and emergency training to commercial fishermen across the state since 1985, and has documented cases where trained fishermen have survived emergencies at sea. These programs cover survival suits, life rafts, and routine safety drills. Research and prevention programs that are led by the National Institute for Occupational Safety and Health have focused on reducing the vessel instability and are promoting safer work practices. Fishing fatalities in Alaska have dropped roughly 73 percent between the early 1990s and 2022, which reflects the impact of industry safety culture and federal oversight.

== See also ==
- Alaskan king crab fishing
- Fishing industry in the United States
