= Watsonville riots =

Violent conflicts between white and Filipino workers in 1930 California

The Watsonville riots was a period of racial violence that took place in Watsonville, California, from January 19 to 23, 1930. Involving violent assaults on Filipino American farm workers by local white residents opposed to immigration, the riots highlighted the racial and socioeconomic tensions in California's agricultural communities.

== Background ==
=== Internal migration ===
As U.S. nationals, Filipinos had the legal right to work in the United States. As early as 1906 they were working on Hawaii's sugar and pineapple plantations as full-time laborers. Assuming the Filipino workers' unfamiliarity with their rights, employers paid the sakadas the lowest wages among all ethnic laborers. They often used Filipinos as strikebreakers as part of a divide and rule strategy to prevent cross-ethnic mobilization and thereby ensure smooth production processes.

The Immigration Acts of 1917 and 1924, which targeted non-whites of Asian descent, still allowed Filipinos to answer the growing demand for labor on the U.S. mainland. From the 1920s on, "overwhelmingly young, single, and male" Filipinos migrated to the Pacific Coast,joining Mexicans in positions previously filled by Chinese, Japanese, Koreans, and Indians. In California, Filipinos predominated within the ethnic Asian farm labor force during the next two decades.

=== Farm life ===
Filipino laborers' resilience in harsh working conditions made them favorite recruits among farm operators. In California's Santa Clara and San Joaquin valleys, Filipinos were often assigned to the backbreaking work of cultivating and harvesting asparagus, celery, and lettuce. As in Hawaii, farmers used the industry and perceived passivity of these "little brown brothers" to counter the so-called "laziness" of working-class whites and other ethnic groups.

Due to gender bias in immigration policy and hiring practices, of the 30,000 Filipino laborers following the cycle of seasonal farm work, only 1 in 14 were women. Unable to meet Filipino women, Filipino farm workers sought the companionship of women outside their own ethnic community, which aggravated mounting racial discord based on economic competition. Outside of field work, Filipino men were noted to dress stylishly and lived the bachelor lifestyle, which made them viable suitors to women outside their own race.

== Mounting tensions ==
During the later 1920s, white men decrying the takeover of jobs and white women by Filipinos resorted to vigilantism to deal with the "Third Asiatic Invasion." Filipino laborers frequenting pool halls or attending street fairs in Stockton, Dinuba, Exeter, and Fresno risked being attacked by nativists threatened by the swelling labor pool, as well as by the Filipino's presumed predatory sexual nature.

In October 1929, Filipinos at a street carnival in Exeter were shot with rubber bands as they walked with their white female companions. In response to the knifing of a white heckler, a mob of 300 white men led by then Chief of Police C. E. Joyner burned the barn of a rancher known to hire Filipinos. Joyner ordered the shutdown of a nearby labor camp. According to local press, the riot was caused primarily by Filipinos' insistence on equal treatment by white women. Firefighters worked to blunt the efforts of the mob, turning their firehoses on them, and stopping the mob from burning down the sleeping quarters of the Filipino workers at the Firebaugh ranch.

Two months later, in the morning of December 2, 1929, in Watsonville, a coastal town 189 miles (304 km) away, police raided a boardinghouse and found two white girls, aged 16 and 11, sleeping in the same room with Perfecto Bandalan, a 25-year-old lettuce grower. The Watsonville community was outraged and remained so even after learning that Bandalan and 16-year-old Esther Schmick were engaged, and that they were caring for Esther's sister Bertha at her mother's request.

== Riots ==
Near midnight on January 18, 1930, 500 white men and youths gathered outside a Filipino taxi dance club in the Palm Beach section of Watsonville. The club was owned by a Filipino man and offered dances with the nine white women who lived there. The mob came with clubs and weapons intending to take the women out and to burn the place down. The building owners threatened to shoot if the rioters persisted and, when the mob refused to leave, the owners opened fire. Police broke up the fight with tear gas.

Two days later, on January 20, a group of Filipino men met with a group of white men near the Pajaro River bridge to settle the score. A group of Hispanic men arrived and took sides with the whites. The riot began and continued for five days.

Hunting parties were organized; the white mob was run like a "military" operation with leaders giving orders to attack or withdraw. They dragged Filipinos from their homes and beat them. They threw Filipinos off the Pajaro River bridge. They ranged up the San Juan road to attack Filipinos at the Storm and Detlefsen ranches; at Riberal's labor camp, twenty-two Filipinos were dragged out and beaten almost to death. A Chinese-run apple-dryer that employed Filipinos was demolished; shots were fired into a Filipino home on Ford Street. Fermin Tobera died at age 22 after being shot in the heart when he was hiding in a closet with 11 others, trying to avoid the rounds of bullets fired at a bunkhouse in Murphy Ranch in San Juan Road on January 23.

The police in Watsonville, led by Sheriff Nick Sinnott, gathered as many Filipinos as they could rescue and guarded them in the City Council's chamber while Monterey County Sheriff Carl Abbott secured the Pajaro side of the river against further riot.

== Aftermath ==
The violence spread to Stockton, San Francisco, San Jose, and other cities. A Filipino club was blown up in Stockton, and the blast was blamed on the Filipinos themselves.

Some Filipinos left the Continental United States. News of the riots spread to the Philippines, where there were protests in solidarity. The body of Fermin Tobera was sent home to the Philippines. He is considered a martyr, a symbol of the Filipinos' fight for independence and equality.

The five days of the Watsonville riots had a profound effect on the attitude of California residents toward imported Asian labor. California's legislature explicitly outlawed Filipino-white intermarriage following 1933's Roldan v. Los Angeles County decision. By 1934, the federal Tydings–McDuffie Act restricted Filipino immigration to fifty people per year. As a result, Filipino immigration plummeted. While Filipinos continued to comprise a significant part of farm labor, Mexicans began to replace them.

Yet, seven months after the Watsonville riots, Filipino lettuce pickers carried out a successful strike in Salinas for better treatment. Such labor actions were repeated in the Salinas Lettuce Strike of 1934 and in 1936. In addition, although their relationships were frowned upon, white women and Filipino men continued to meet and marry.

On September 4, 2011, California formally apologized to Filipinos and Filipino Americans in an Assembly resolution authored by Assemblyman Luis Alejo, D-Salinas. "Filipino Americans have a proud history of hard work and perseverance," Alejo said in a statement. "California, however, does not have as proud a history regarding its treatment of Filipino Americans. For these past injustices, it's time that we recognize the pain and suffering this community has endured."

== See also ==
- List of incidents of civil unrest in the United States
