= Taxi dance hall =

Type of dance hall with paid dancers

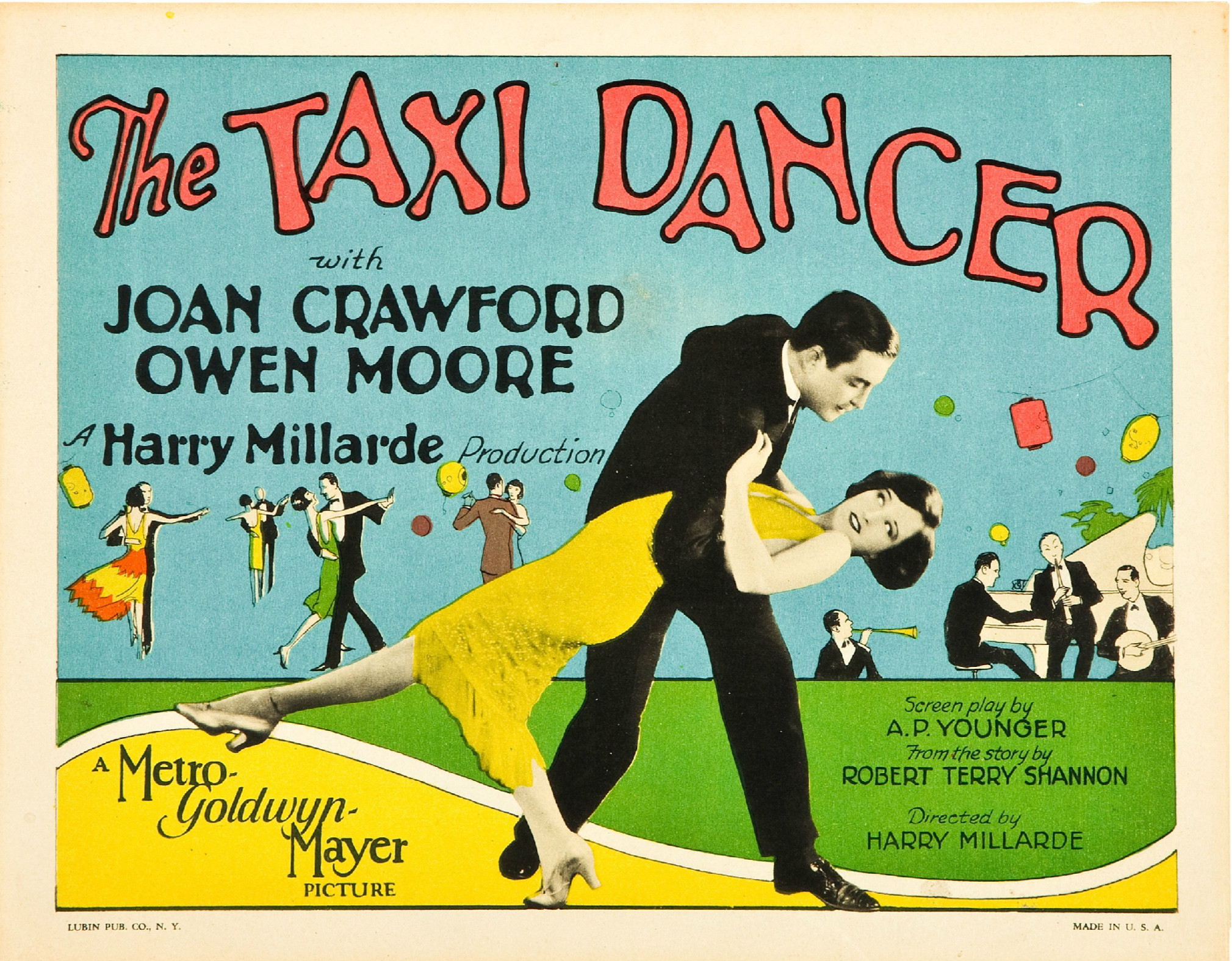
Taxi dancers were common characters in films and novels. Lobby card for The Taxi Dancer (1927)

A taxi dance hall is a type of dance hall where dancers, usually young women, called taxi dancers are paid to dance with usually male patrons. The owners of a taxi dance hall provide music and a dance floor for their patrons and taxi dancers. In the United States during the 1920s and '30s, when taxi dancing was at its peak, patrons of taxi dance halls would typically buy dance tickets for ten cents each. When they presented a ticket to a taxi dancer, she would dance with them for the length of a single song. Taxi dancers earned a commission on every dance ticket that they collected. The ticket-a-dance system was the centerpiece of the taxi dance halls. Taxi dance halls are vividly represented on the ouverture of Henry Miller novel Sexus, where the narrator falls in love with a taxi dancer after meeting her on a Thursday night, circa 1928.

== Origins and development ==
The taxi dance hall as an American institution that was first introduced in 1913 within San Francisco's Barbary Coast neighborhood. At that time reform movements were shutting down many bordellos and red-light districts within America's cities, and strength for Prohibition was gaining. In 1920, when the taxi dance halls entered their steep upward climb to popularity, prohibition was enacted and made serving alcohol in saloons, bars, and cafes illegal. The taxi dance hall's roots can be traced to a number of earlier dance establishments.

=== Barbary Coast dance hall ===
Prior to the emergence of taxi dance halls in San Francisco, California, that city popularized a different form of dance hall called the Barbary Coast dance hall, or also called the Forty-Nine['49] dance hall. Forty-Niner is a term for the gold prospectors who came to California during the California Gold Rush circa 1849. At the Barbary Coast dance halls, female employees danced with male patrons and earned their living on commissions paid for the drinks that they could encourage their male dance partners to buy. These dance halls were representative of the Old West—noisy, rough, boisterous, and occasionally violent. As writer Will Irwin described:

The Barbary Coast was a loud bit of hell. No one knows who coined the name. The place was simply three blocks of solid dance halls, there for the delight of the sailors of the world. On a fine busy night every door blared loud dance music from orchestras, steam pianos, and gramophones, and the cumulative effect of the sound which reached the streets was chaos and pandemonium. Almost anything might be happening behind the swinging doors.

=== Closed dance hall ===
But in 1913, San Francisco enacted new laws that would forbid dancing in any cafe or saloon where alcohol was served. The closure of the Barbary Coast dance halls quickly fostered a new kind of pay-to-dance scheme called the closed dance hall. The name was derived from the fact that female patrons were not allowed—the only women permitted in these halls were the dancing female employees. A report from Public Dance Hall Committee of San Francisco Civic League of Voters states:

In September, 1913, the Police Commissioner prohibited dancing in any cafe, restaurant, or saloon where liquor was sold. This resolution wiped out dancing on the "Coast"[Barbary Coast] and resulted in the appearance of the so-called 'closed' hall in the districts adjoining. There the girls were employed to dance with men patrons on a commission basis and salary. These halls had continuous dancing with practically no rest periods, and made large profits. Patrons paid ten cents for each dance, lasting less than two minutes. About six hundred girls were employed in these closed dance halls.

Inside a closed dance hall, a dancer would earn her income by the number of tickets she could collect in exchange for dances. The management would typically pay the girls half the price of a dance ticket. With the closed dance hall, the centerpiece of the taxi dance hall—the ticket-a-dance system—was introduced. Community groups began to oppose the closed dance halls, and in response to this growing political threat, these early taxi dance halls began to disguise themselves as dance schools. In 1921 the police commission ruled against employment of women as taxi dancers, and San Francisco's taxi dance halls were permanently shut down.

=== Dance academies ===
Around the time that San Francisco's taxi dance halls were being shut down, the taxi dance hall was being reinvented in differing formats elsewhere in America. Dance academies, which were struggling to survive, began to consider the ticket-a-dance system. Previous to the ticket-a-dance system, dance schools would use the line up plan to provide dance partners for their students. Female dance instructors would get in a line, and students would then dance with the next instructor in line. Students were not allowed to choose a female dance instructor for their practice dances.

The first instance of the ticket-a-dance system in Chicago came from a description, given by Godfrey Johnson of Mader-Johnson Dance Studios:

I was in New York during the summer of 1919, and while there visited a new studio opened by Mr. W___ W___ of San Francisco, where he had introduced a ten-cent-ticket-a-dance plan. When I got home I kept thinking of that plan as a way to get my advanced students to come back more often and to have experience dancing with different instructors. So I decided to put a ten-cent-a-lesson system in the big hall on the third floor of my building... But I soon noticed that it wasn't my former pupils who were coming up to dance, but a rough hoodlum element from Clark Street... Things went from bad to worse; I did the best I could to keep the hoodlums in check.

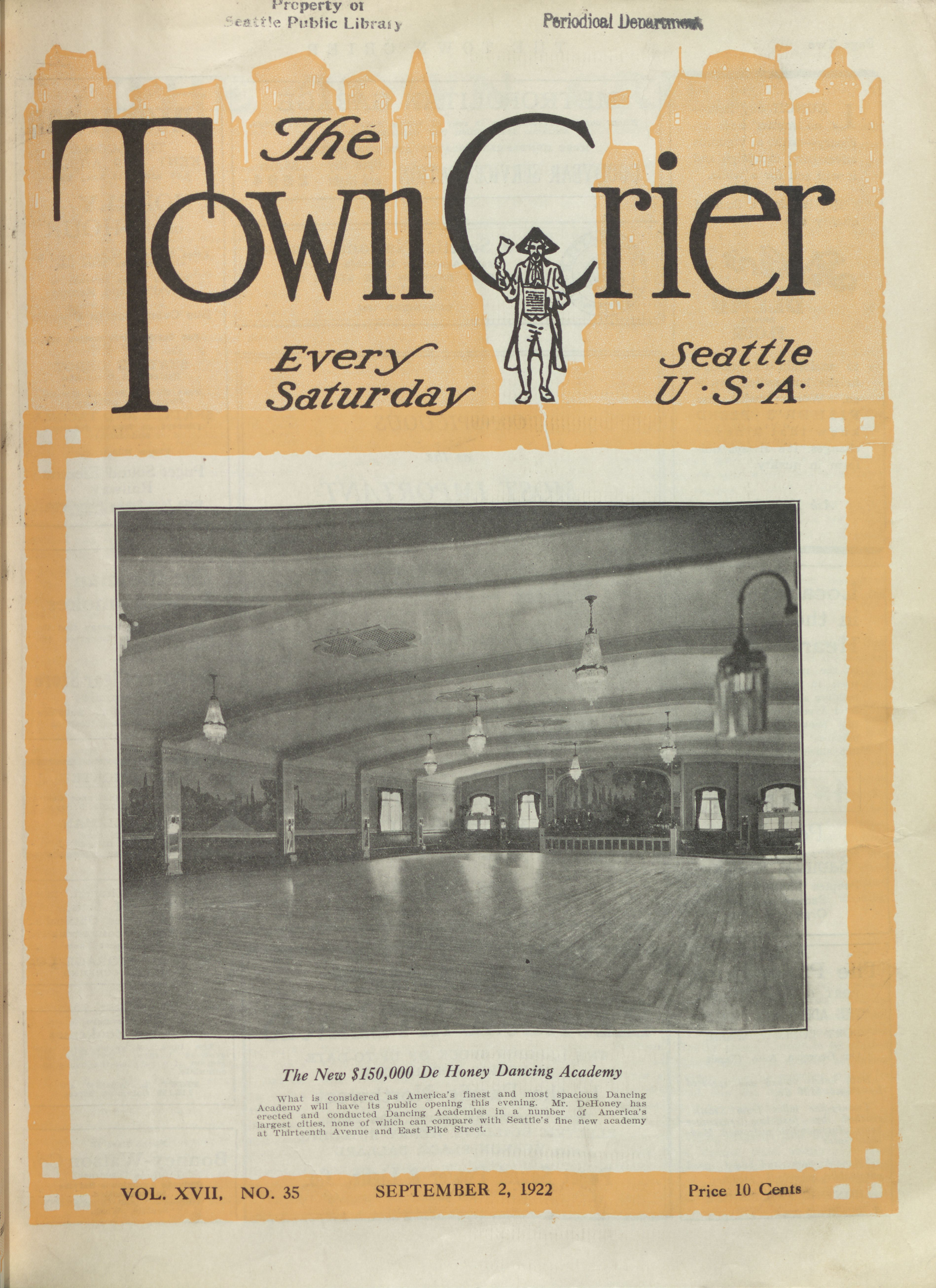
New dancing academy in Seattle on a 1922 magazine cover, one of several constructed by Mr. De Honey in several American cities

Other dance schools began to try the ticket-a-dance system as well. As a former proprietor of the Colonial Dancing Academy in Chicago states:

I took over the ten-cent-a-lesson idea from Johnson... Before long I began to notice that many men who came were already good dancers. When I realized that these fellows were coming back all the time just to get somebody to dance with, I laughed out loud. Up to that time I wouldn't have believed that there were fellows who would be willing to pay as much as they did -- just to get a chance to dance... Sometimes I noticed that certain fellows always wanted to dance with certain girls, but I wouldn't allow that, except as they took the instructor at an hourly rate... I only ran the hall a year, but all the time I thought of it as a dancing school—not a place to rent a dance partner.

Many dance academy proprietors, who were disturbed by the "hoodlum element" that the ticket-a-dance system attracted, were very reluctant to adopt the dance tickets. But a Greek immigrant, Nicholas Philocrates, perceived the power of this opportunity, and fully embraced the ticket-a-dance plan that he had seen on the West Coast in 1920. Mr. Philocrates said:

When I was in Chicago in 1920 after a trip to the West Coast I decided to open a school of my own. I visited the different schools, and found that Mr. Swanson at the Colonial Dancing Academy was the only one conducting one of the lesson-ticket plans... I knew of the ticket-a-lesson plan as it was used on the Pacific Coast—I visited some of the halls out there—and so I knew that the idea of having pupils select their own instructors would work all right, when people got used to it.

Though Philocrates describes his dance hall as a "school", he would soon be followed by other Greek immigrants who would open other taxi dance halls in Chicago that did not provide any instruction whatsoever. Some historians consider Philocrates to be the father of the taxi dance hall.

=== Public ballrooms ===
Also at that time, many large cities like Chicago had large public ballrooms. The public ballrooms were struggling to survive, as they had difficulty attracting as many female patrons as male patrons. Partially due to the large immigrant populations of that time, many of the neighborhoods where taxi dance halls would compete with public ballrooms had five times as many men as women. While the public ballrooms had few women and many might refuse to dance, the taxi dance halls had many eager female dance partners who would agree to "dance with all-comers" that held dance tickets. The new competition of the increasingly popular taxi-dance halls would cause many ballrooms to either adopt the ticket-a-dance system or go out of business.

=== Rise and fall from popularity ===
Taxi dance halls flourished in America during the 1920s and 1930s. In 1931 there were over 100 taxi dance halls in New York City, and between 35,000 and 50,000 men would go to these halls every week. There were also establishments which offered male professional dancers to women such as Maxim's in New York, where dancer/actor Rudolph Valentino got an early start.

By 1925 in the United States, the taxi dance halls were coming under attack by reform movements that insisted on licensing, police supervision, and succeeded in closing down some taxi dance halls for lewd behavior. After World War II the popularity of taxi dance halls began to diminish. In the 1930s, 50 cities had taxi dance halls, but by 1954 that number dropped to just 6 cities. Only ten taxi-dance halls remained in New York City by 1952. Most of the taxi-dance halls disappeared by the 1960s. Many historians say that the return of the saloon and the cocktail lounge of post-Prohibition America contributed to the demise of the taxi dance hall.

The ethnic diversity of patrons who danced with white women caused fights, especially for dance halls located in rural areas. A taxi dance club that catered to Filipino American farm workers was one cause of the Watsonville riots of 1930.

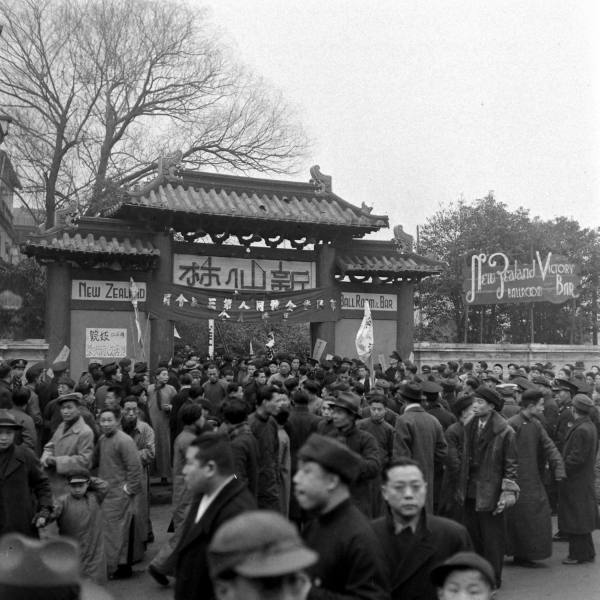
1948 demonstration against the closure of taxi dance halls in Shanghai, China

Similar forces led to the closure of taxi dance halls of other countries. In Tokyo the first dance halls opened in 1925 but closed in the late 1930s after increased police harassment. During a period of austerity, in 1947 China ordered the closure of taxi dance halls despite the protests of dancers.

Today some cities still have clubs where female employees can be hired to dance with patrons. These clubs no longer use the ticket-a-dance system, but have time-clocks and punch-cards that allow the patron to pay for the dancer's time by the minute. The clock used by the cashier to determine the cost of time spent with a hostess is often set a few minutes later than the clock used to print the checkout time on the ticket, thus fraudulently increasing revenues for the establishment and hostess alike. Particularly accommodating hostesses often expect tips equivalent to the amount charged for their time. Some of these modern dance clubs exist in the same buildings where taxi dancing was done in the early 20th century. The Dreamland club of Los Angeles was such an establishment. In the 1930s it was called Roseland Roof, and was owned by the Fenton brothers. When the Fenton brothers sold the club in 1981, the new buyers renamed the club to Dreamland, and continued taxi dancing in its original ballroom. These latter day establishments, including Starlight and Fantasy, are called Hostess Clubs.

== Patrons ==
Paul G. Cressey's book, entitled The Taxi-Dance Hall: A Sociological Study in Commercialized Recreation and City Life, gives a history of taxi dance halls, with interviews with taxi dancers and patrons. Cressey describes the phenomena as in terms of the human needs of American city dwellers in the early 20th century. He listed nine categories to describe the types of patrons:

- Racial or ethnic groups denied acceptance elsewhere.
- Caucasian immigrants, frequently from a European country. Italians, Poles, Greeks, and Jews predominated.
- Older men, approaching fifty, who want to rival younger men in courting young women. They were sometimes divorced, widowers, or deserters.
- Married men whose marriages are suffering, seeking clandestine adventures.
- Lonely, isolated strangers who might be from a rural area or smaller city, and are new to the ways of the city.
- The footloose globetrotter who has a very mobile lifestyle.
- The slummer, men of higher incomes who wish to see how the other half lives.
- Men who suffer from physical abnormalities or disabilities.
- The fugitive, someone who might have a criminal background or suffers from local condemnation.

Cressey goes on to describe the male patrons of taxi dance halls as being a varied and occasionally motley crew:

Young men and boisterous youths...gray-haired men in their sixties...brown skinned Filipinos...Chinese waiters...pudgy men of forty or fifty who dance awkwardly...rough and ready fellows who seem unable to assimilate completely some of the modes of city life...a few spectacled well groomed middle-aged men who move quietly, politely...and finally, there are a few men, handicapped by physical disabilities, for whom the taxi dancer's obligation to accept all-comers makes the establishment a haven of refuge. The dwarfed, maimed, and pock-marked all find social acceptance here; and together with the other variegated types they make of the institution a picturesque and rather pathetic revelation of human nature and city life.

In general, patrons were rarely businessmen or professional people, but were typically skilled or semi-skilled workers from the lower middle class. Frequently the patrons experienced social obstacles that prevented them from seeking feminine company through more traditional means. For the socially ostracized, the taxi dance hall became oasis where they could temporarily experience a sense of equality, recognition, and sometimes a fantasy of romance.

For others of a more individualized nature, the taxi dance hall became an interesting diversion that allowed dancing and feminine company without the restrictions of more traditional customs. Cressey interviews a patron [case #42] who describes:

I'm in and out of the city quite a good deal. I usually spend about two weeks a month in Chicago, and when I'm in the city I often come here. This hall has the finest girls of any in the city. Many of them are very nice girls and some are positively beautiful. I don't believe I'd enjoy the Lonesome Club. There aren't any attractive girls over there. Much of my enjoyment in dancing comes from being near a beautiful young girl who is graceful in her movements and is a good dancer. I only really enjoy being among young people and these are the only ones I have a chance to meet and know. Associating with them helps keep me young. Just to associate with these hopeful and enthusiastic people young people a few hours a week is better than any tonic ...

He continued to describe his aims:

No, I don't attempt to secure dates with these girls. They aren't interested in a man of my age. However, that doesn't keep me from enjoying them here ... I don't feel out of place here. As a matter of fact, I really enjoy my dancing here more than I would at some important social gathering. When I was operating my clothing factory in New York City, and my wife was living, I used to go out in society quite a little. But there were always some restraints. At a social function I had to dance with certain women, not because they were good dancers or were attractive women, but because they were the wives of some friends of mine or of someone else who was influential. But at this establishment I don't have to dance with a girl unless she is attractive to me, and I can stop dancing whenever I want—and there are no further obligations. A man is absolutely free here ... But even if I could arrange it [a date to dance with], I'm not certain I would want to. It would involve some social responsibilities I might not want to assume.

== Dancers ==
=== Backgrounds of the dancers ===
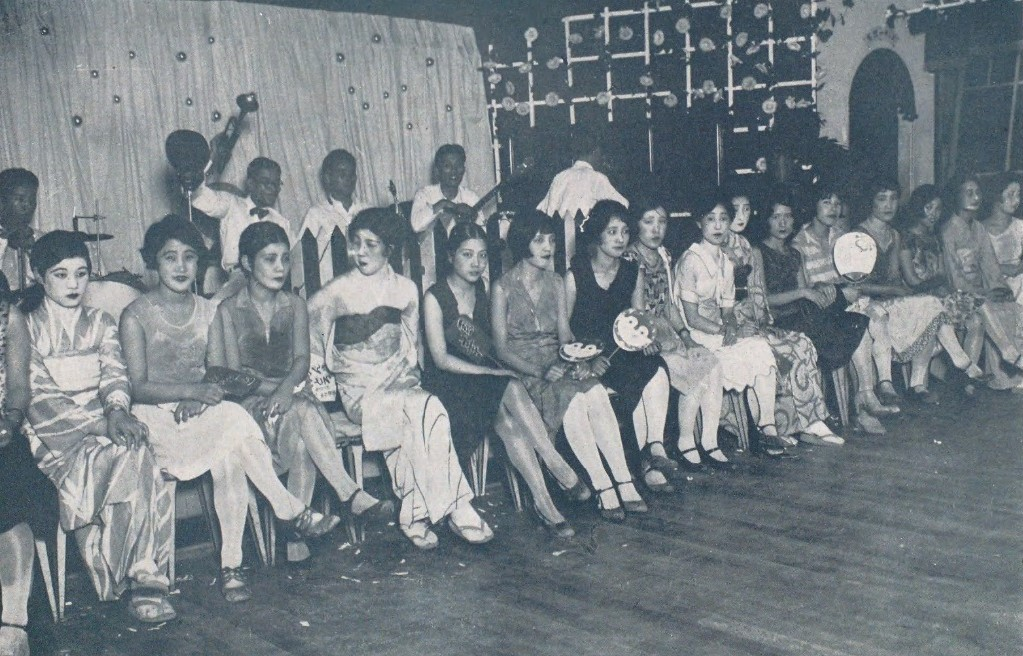
Taxi dancers at a Tokyo dance hall in 1930.

During the 1920s the ages of taxi dancers ranged from 15 to 28 years, and two-thirds of taxi dancers came from homes in which the financial support of a father had been removed. They were occasionally runaways from their families, and it was not unusual for taxi dancers to be from homes where the parents had separated. And despite their young age, two-fifths of taxi dancers had been previously married, but were no longer.

Many times the dancers were immigrants from European countries such as Poland, Sweden, the Netherlands, Germany, and France. Various cultural conflicts would arise between parents and their dancing offspring, especially if the parents were from rural areas. For dancers of an immigrant family, the dancer was often the financial support of the family. When a girl supplanted the parent or parents as breadwinner, sometimes the dancer would assume an aggressive role in the family by "subordinating the parental standards to her own requirements and demands".

These conflicts in values between dancers and their parents frequently caused the dancers to lead so-called "double lives", denying that they worked at a taxi-dance hall. To further this divide, the girls would sometimes adopt aliases so that their activities might not reach their families' ears. When parents found out, there were three typical outcomes—the girl gave up her dancing career, the girl left home and became estranged from the family, or the family accepted the girl's conduct, however reluctantly, due to financial necessity.

Despite the frequent hardships, many of the dancers seemed to enjoy the lifestyle as they adopted a pursuit of what Cressey calls "money, excitement, and affection". Within his book, Cressey gives scores of quotes from taxi dancers who speak very favorably about their experiences at a taxi-dance hall.

One dancer [case #15] from the 1920s describes her start at a taxi-dance hall.

I was working as a waitress in a Loop restaurant for about a month. I never worked in a dance hall like this and didn't know about them. One day the "boss" of this hall was eating in the restaurant and told me I could make twice as much money in his "dancing school." I went there one night to try it – and then quit my job at the restaurant. I always liked to dance anyway, so it was really fun.

And yet another dancer from Chicago [case #11] spoke very positively of her experiences:

After I had gotten started at the dance hall I enjoyed the life too much to want to give it up. It was easy work, gave me more money than I could earn any other way, and I had a chance to meet all kinds of people. I had no dull moments. I met bootleggers, rum-runners, hijackers, stick-up men, globe-trotters, and hobos. There were all different kinds of men, different from the kind I'd be meeting if I'd stayed at home with my folks in Rogers Park... After a girl starts in the dance hall and makes good it's easy to live for months without ever getting outside the influence of the dance hall. Take myself for instance: I lived with other dance-hall girls, met my fellows at the dance hall, got my living in the dance hall. In fact, there was nothing I wanted that I couldn't get through it. It was an easy life, and I just drifted along with the rest. I suppose if something hadn't come along to jerk me out, I'd still be a drifter out on the West Side.

=== Vocabulary of the dancers ===
The special vocabulary of the dancers is not only a form of communication, but also helps describe the dancers as it reflects their judgments, activities, and interests. Here are some example that Cressey lists in his book.

- Black and Tan – A colored and white cabaret
- Buying the groceries – Living in a clandestine relationship
- Class – Term used by Filipinos to denote the taxi-dance halls
- Fish – A man whom the girls can easily exploit for personal gain
- Fruit – An easy mark
- Hot stuff – Stolen goods
- Make – To secure a date with
- Mark – A person who is gullible and easily taken advantage of
- Monkey-chaser – A man interested in a taxi dancer or chorus girl
- Monkey shows – Burlesque shows with chorus girls
- Nickel-hopper – A taxi dancer
- On the ebony – A taxi-dance hall or taxi dancer having social contacts with men of races other than white
- Opera – Burlesque show
- Paying the rent – Living in a clandestine relationship
- Picking up – Securing an after-dance engagement with a taxi dancer
- Playing – Successfully exploiting one of the opposite sex
- Professional – A government investigator. One visiting the taxi-dance hall for ulterior purposes
- Punk – A novitiate; an uninitiated youth or young girl, usually referring to an unsophisticated taxi dancer
- Racket – A special enterprise to earn money, honestly or otherwise
- Shakedown – Enforced exaction of graft

== Cultural forces ==
At the start of the 20th century, the United States would for the first time have more inhabitants living within its cities than in rural and small-town areas. Cities were experiencing extreme growth; indeed, Chicago's population doubled between 1900 and 1930. Many young men and women were leaving their rural and small-town neighborhoods for the same promise of adventure that the Old West had previously provided. At this time, America was experiencing a flood of male-dominated immigration.

Entertainment in America's cities was becoming a big business. New forms of mass entertainment were the baseball stadium, the football stadium, the amusement park, and the motion picture theater. Cressey and other sociologists like Ernest W. Burgess came to see taxi dance halls, and these other new forms of mass entertainment, as "commercializing the human interest in stimulation".

For this uprooted culture, cities provided a type of anonymity that was not found in their previous rural and family-oriented neighborhoods. Once inside a city, young men and women were free to do as they pleased without moral criticism from their families or neighbors. Cressey felt that cities became "inhabited by rootless, detached people who connect with each other primarily on the basis of mutual exploitation". The taxi dance hall was just such a place where very different people from very different backgrounds—patrons and dancers—would meet for temporary and unlikely alliances. Frequently inside the taxi dance hall, the human needs of unassimilated males would meet the economic needs of taxi dancers.

Near the time when Cressey finished his book in 1932, he noticed reform movements were attempting to shut down the taxi dance halls. Cressey was disturbed by the fact that if taxi dance halls were eliminated without appropriate substitutes, the human needs that fueled the phenomenon would go unanswered and possibly find self-destructive forms of expression. For Cressey, the taxi dance hall became a symptom of the isolation, loneliness, and alienation that plagues many cities.

== Lap dancing ==
Taxi dancing is often viewed as the parent phenomenon of lap dancing, and indeed there are many similarities. Like the taxi dancer, the lap dancer provides her service only for the length of a single song. It also received complaints from the community—bringing up the same controversies concerning morality, touching, and government regulation. However, decades after the taxi dance halls of the 1920s had been maligned by reformists, a California State judge in 1999 overruled a law prohibiting taxi dancing while stating that "taxi dancing is an established tradition in America that has gone on since the 1920s".

The "fantasy of romance" also plays a role in both taxi dancing and lap dancing. Edward Fenton, a former owner of a large taxi dance hall, Roseland Roof, was interviewed in 1999 about the taxi dancing scene during the 1930s. When asked about the taxi dancers' patrons, Fenton replied: "The customer was lonely, that's the word. The club brought in lonesome people. They came here to meet with girls and carry on a secret romance". But when asked if he was implying that the customers had sexual affairs with the taxi dancers, Fenton replied: "No. I didn't say that... the customer lived in a fantasy." Similarly, today's patrons of lap dancing sometimes discuss their experiences within Internet forums, and even a quick read of these forums reveals that they also sometimes have feelings of romance for dancers whom they refer to as an ATF, an acronym for All Time Favorite. During a 2002 interview for San Francisco Magazine, a lap dancer for the Mitchell Brothers strip club described the mindset of some patrons:

Some of these guys became totally obsessed with the dancers and didn't care that it was a completely unhealthy relationship. At the sfRedBook.com message board, sometimes a guy will go on there and say, "Oh, I really think I'm really in love with this dancer", and another guy goes, "Come on, buddy, the sooner you face up to the fact you're a PL [pathetic loser], the better off you'll be." ...They had all this money and power and they thought, "Oh, I can buy the woman of my dreams now." And they could. But it wasn't real.

Sociologist Paul Cressey may have prophesied the invention of lap dancing some 80 years ago when he suggested that if taxi dancing were to be eliminated, the human needs that fueled the phenomenon would go unanswered and find more extreme forms of expression.

== See also ==
- Taxi-dancer
- Ballroom dancing
- Music Hall
- J. Win Austin, Los Angeles, California, City Council member, 1941–43, proposed health inspections for taxi dancers

== Sources ==
- Asbury, Herbert (1933). The Barbary Coast: An Informal History of the San Francisco Underworld. Thunder's Mouth Press. ISBN 9781560254089.
- Cressey, Paul (1932). The Taxi-Dance Hall: A Sociological Study in Commercialized Recreation and City Life. University of Chicago Press. ISBN 9780226120515.
- Freeland, David (2009). Automats, Taxi Dances, and Vaudeville: Excavating Manhattan's Lost Places of Leisure. NYU Press. ISBN 978-0814727638.
