= List of strikes =

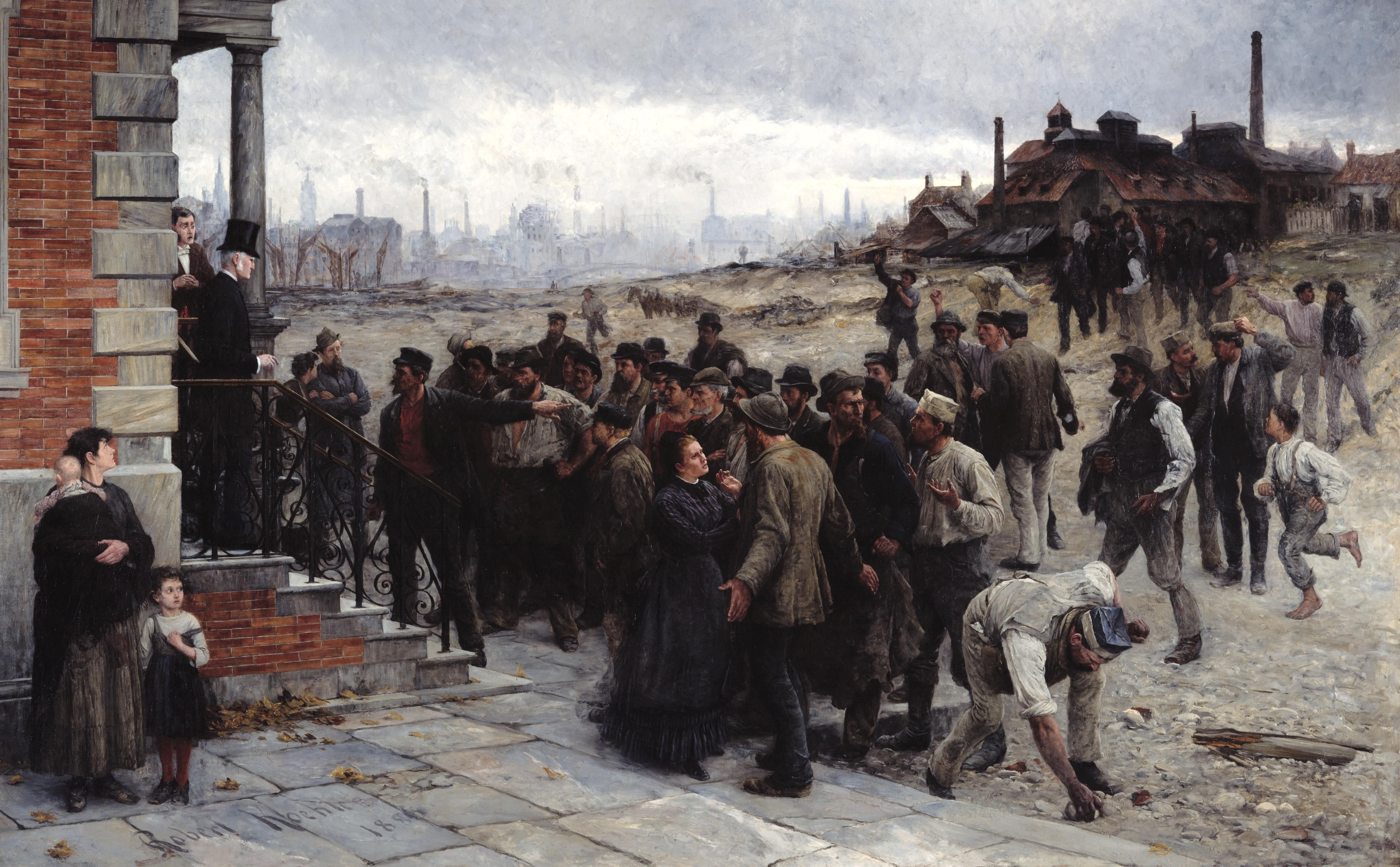
Agitated workers face the factory owner in The Strike, painted by Robert Koehler in 1886

The following is a list of specific strikes (workers refusing to work, seeking to change their conditions in a particular industry or an individual workplace, or striking in solidarity with those in another particular workplace) and general strikes (widespread refusal of workers to work in an organized political campaign on a broader national or international level).

== Chronological list of strikes ==
=== Twelfth century BCE ===
Date	Strike	Place	Country
c. 1158 BCE	Deir el-Medina strikes (possibly earliest recorded strike action in history)	Deir el-Medina	New Kingdom of Egypt

=== Fourteenth century ===
Date	Strike	Place	Country
1353	1353 Walsham Manor strike	Walsham le Willows	England

=== Sixteenth century ===
Date	Strike	Place	Country
1538	1538 Cobblers' Strike	Wisbech	England

=== Seventeenth century ===
Date	Strike	Place	Country
1619	Polish craftsmen's strike	Jamestown	Thirteen Colonies
1661	Indentured Servants' Plot	Virginia colony	Thirteen Colonies

=== Eighteenth century ===
Date	Strike	Place	Country
1766	Silver miners' strike	Mineral del Monte	Mexico
1787	Weavers' strike	Calton, Glasgow	Scotland

=== Nineteenth century ===
==== 1800–1849 ====
Date	Strike	Place	Country
1818	Manchester Mill Worker's Strike	New Hampshire	United States
1824	Slater's Mill Women's Strike	Rhode Island	United States
1825	Valparaíso Fishermen's strike	Valparaíso	Chile
1827	Palanqueen Strike of Calcutta (First documented strike in India)	Calcutta	India
1828	New Hampshire Mill Women's Strike	New Hampshire	United States
1833	Four pennies riot	Anzin	France
1834	Lowell Massachusetts Mill Women's Strike	Lowell, Massachusetts	United States
1835	Textile strike	Paterson, New Jersey	United States
1835	1835 Washington Navy Yard labor strike	Washington Navy Yard, Washington D.C.	United States
1835	New England Mill Strike	New England	United States
1835	Philadelphia General Strike	Philadelphia	United States
1836	Lowell Massachusetts Mill Women's Strike	Lowell, Massachusetts	United States

==== 1850–1899 ====
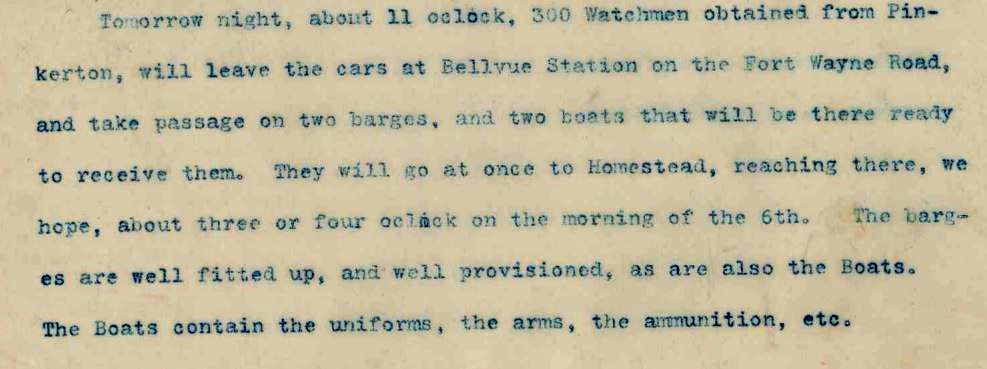
Frick's letter describing the plans and munitions that will be on the barges when the Pinkerton guards and County Sheriffs arrive to confront the strikers in the 1892 Homestead

Date	Strike	Place	Country
1853–1854	Preston strike of 1853–1854	Preston, Lancashire	United Kingdom
1859	London builders' strike	London	United Kingdom
1860	New England Shoemakers Strike of 1860	Lynn, Massachusetts	United States
1864	Collar Laundry Union strike	Troy, New York	United States
1865	Upper Peninsula miners' strike	Marquette, Michigan	United States
1867	1867 Chinese Labor Strike	Sierra Nevada, California	United States
1870	1870 North Adams strike	North Adams, Massachusetts	United States
1872	Eight hour day strike	New York City	United States
1872	Gas Stokers' strike	London	United Kingdom
1872	Metropolitan Police strike of 1872	London	United Kingdom
1873	Coal miners' strike of 1873	northeastern Ohio, northwestern Pennsylvania	United States
1874	Tompkins Square Riot	New York City	United States
1877	Great Railroad Strike	nationwide	United States
1877–1878	Cigar makers' strike of 1877	New York City	United States
1881	1881 Atlanta washerwomen strike	Atlanta	United States
1883	Camp Dump strike	Omaha, Nebraska	United States
1886	Great Southwest railroad strike	nationwide	United States
1886	Haymarket affair	Chicago, Illinois	United States
1886	Bay View massacre	Milwaukee, Wisconsin	United States
1887	Thibodaux massacre (sugar cane workers' strike)	Lafourche Parish, Louisiana	United States
1888	Burlington railroad strike	Chicago, Burlington and Quincy Railroad	United States
1888	Matchgirls' strike	London	United Kingdom
1889	London dock strike	London, England	United Kingdom
1889	Kristiania match workers' strike of 1889	Oslo	Sweden-Norway
1889	1889 Twin Cities streetcar strike	Twin Cities	United States
1890	Southampton Dock strike	Southampton, England	United Kingdom
1890	Maritime dispute	Melbourne	Australia
1891	Australian shearers' strike	Queensland	Australia
1891	Cotton pickers' strike of 1891	Lee County, Arkansas	United States
1891	Coal Creek War (miners)	Anderson County, Tennessee	United States
1892	Miners' strike	Broken Hill	Australia
1892	Homestead strike (steel workers)	Homestead, Pennsylvania	United States
1892	Buffalo switchmen's strike	Buffalo, New York	United States
1892	Coeur d'Alene labor strike	Coeur d'Alene, Idaho	United States
1893	UK miners' strike	nationwide	United Kingdom
1894	Pullman Strike	Pullman, Chicago	United States
1894	Great Northern Railway strike	nationwide	United States
1894	Bituminous coal miners' strike	nationwide	United States
1895	Yaroslavl Great Manufacture strike	Yaroslavl, Yaroslavl Governorate	Russian Empire
1896	Leadville miners' strike	Leadville, Colorado	United States
1897	Lattimer massacre	Lattimer, Pennsylvania	United States
1898	South Wales coal strike	Wales	United Kingdom
1899	Coeur d'Alene labor confrontation	Coeur d'Alene, Idaho	United States
1899	Weight Strike	Ybor City, Tampa, Florida	United States
1899	Newsboys' strike	New York City	United States
1899	Russian student strike	St. Petersburg University	Russian Empire

=== Twentieth century ===
==== 1900s ====
Date	Strike	Place	Country
1900	St. Louis streetcar strike of 1900	St. Louis, Missouri	United States
1900–1903	Penrhyn 'Streic Fawr' ('Great Strike)	Bethesda, North Wales	Wales, UK
1900	Anthracite coal strike	Eastern Pennsylvania	United States
1901	U.S. Steel recognition strike of 1901	Homestead, Pennsylvania	United States
1902	Anthracite coal strike	Illinois, Mississippi and Texas	United States
1903	Oxnard strike of 1903	Oxnard, California	United States
1903	Carbon County Strike	Carbon County, Utah	United States
1903–1904	Colorado Labor Wars, Western Federation of Miners	Colorado	United States
1906	Cananea strike	Sonora, Mexico	Mexico
1907	Music Hall Strike of 1907	London	United Kingdom
1907	Boston garment worker strike	Boston	United States
1907	Belfast Dock strike	Belfast	Ireland
1907	Río Blanco strike	Orizaba, Veracruz	Mexico
1907	1907 San Francisco streetcar strike	San Francisco, California	United States
1907	Revolt of the Languedoc winegrowers	Languedoc, Pyrénées-Orientales	France
1907	1907 Mesabi Range strike	Mesabi Range, Minnesota	United States
1908	Pensacola streetcar operators' strike	Pensacola, Florida	United States
1909	Georgia Railroad strike	Georgia	United States
1909	Pressed Steel Car strike of 1909	McKees Rocks, Pennsylvania	United States
1909	New York shirtwaist strike of 1909 "Uprising of the 20,000"	Manhattan, New York	United States

==== 1910s ====
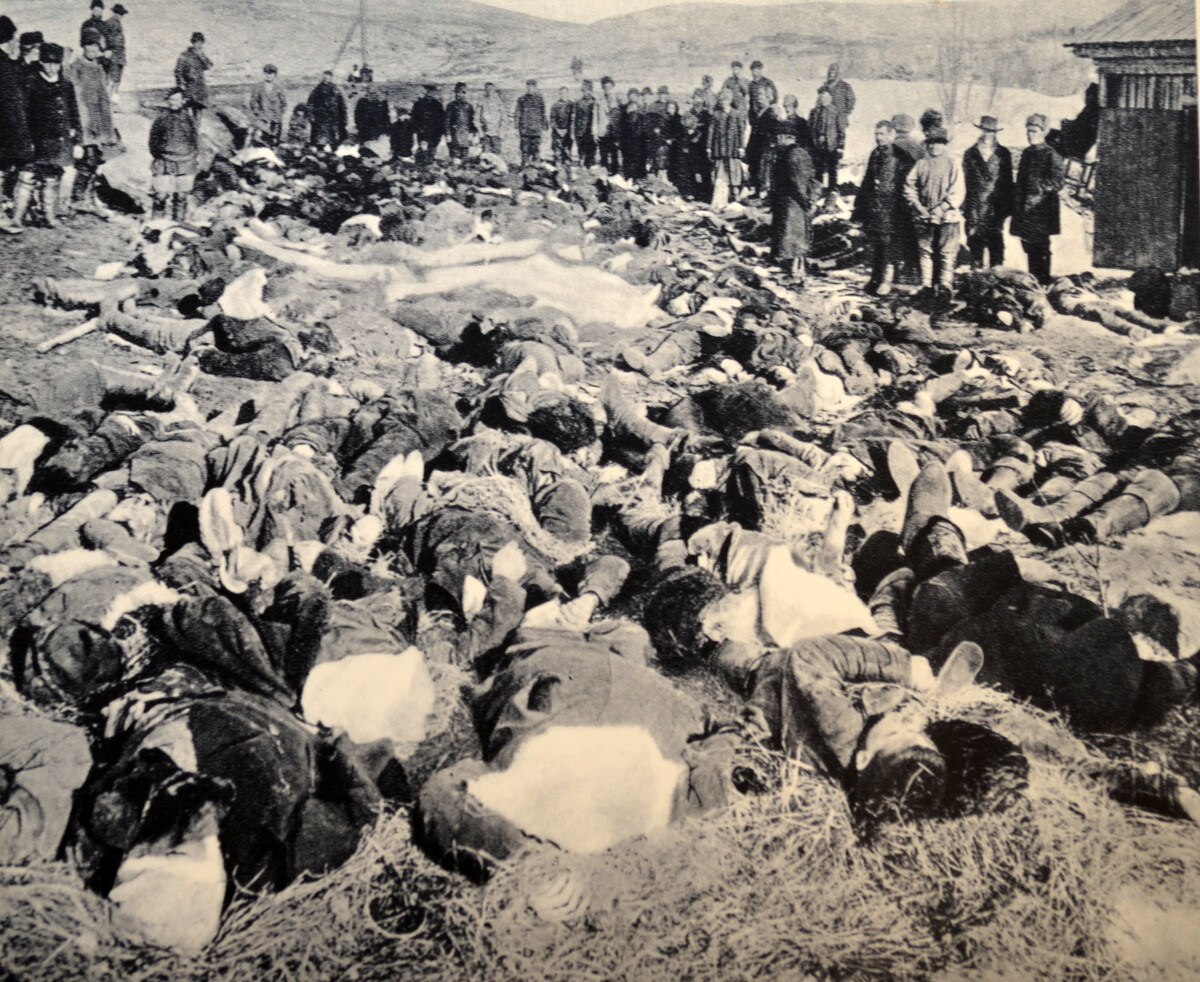
Bodies immediately after the Lena massacre of striking goldfield workers in 1912

Date	Strike	Place	Country
1910–1911	Westmoreland County coal strike of 1910–1911	Westmoreland County, Pennsylvania	United States
1910–1911	Tampa cigar makers' strike of 1910–11	Tampa, Florida	United States
1910	Clockmakers' strike	New York City	United States
1910–1911	1910 Chicago garment workers' strike	Chicago	United States
1911	1911 Liverpool general transport strike	Liverpool, Merseyside	United Kingdom
1911	Illinois Central shopmen's strike of 1911	Illinois, Mississippi and Texas	United States
1911	1911 Grand Rapids furniture workers strike	Grand Rapids, Michigan	United States
1912	1912 Lawrence textile strike, also called the "Bread and Roses" strike	Lawrence, Massachusetts	United States
1912	Waihi miners' strike	Waihi	New Zealand
1911–1912	Louisiana-Texas Lumber War of 1911–1912	Eastern Louisiana	United States
1912	Paint Creek–Cabin Creek strike of 1912	Kanawha County, West Virginia	United States
1912	1912 New York City waiters' strike	New York City	United States
1912–1913	1912–1913 Little Falls textile strike	Little Falls, New York	United States
1912–13	Seattle Fishermen halibut strike of 1912	Seattle, Washington	United States
1912	1912 Brisbane general strike	Brisbane, Queensland	Australia
1913	1913 El Paso smelters' strike	El Paso, Texas	United States
1913	Dublin strike and lockout	Dublin	Ireland
1913	Ludlow Massacre	Ludlow, Colorado	United States
1913	Paterson silk strike	Paterson, New Jersey	United States
1913	1913 Sligo Dock strike	Sligo	Ireland
1913	Leith dockers' strike of 1913	Leith, Edinburgh, Scotland	United Kingdom
1913	1913 Great Strike	nationwide	New Zealand
1913	Indianapolis streetcar strike of 1913	Indianapolis, Indiana	United States
1913–1914	Copper Country strike of 1913–1914	Upper Michigan	United States
1914–1939	Bursdon teachers' strike	Burston, Norfolk	England
1914–1915	1914–1915 Fulton Bag and Cotton Mills strike	Atlanta	United States
1915–16	Bayonne refinery strikes	Bayonne, New Jersey	United States
1915–17	1915–1917 Wheelbarrow Mine strike	Johnson County, Arkansas	United States
1916	1916 Atlanta streetcar strike	Atlanta	United States
1916 Mesabi Range strike	Mesabi Range, Minnesota	United States	
1916–1917	1916–1917 northern Minnesota lumber strike	Minnesota	United States
1917	The Great Strike	nationwide	Australia
1917–19	1917–1919 Brazil strike movement	nationwide	Brazil
1917	1917 Twin Cities streetcar strike	Minneapolis–Saint Paul	United States
1918	BLE strike in New York City	New York City	United States
1918	1918 Romanian typographers' strike	Bucharest	Romania
1918–19	British police strikes in 1918 and 1919	nationwide	United Kingdom
1918–20	1918–1920 New York City rent strikes	New York City	United States
1919	Battle of George Square	Glasgow	Scotland
1919	US Strike wave of 1919	nationwide	United States
1919	La Canadiense strike	Catalonia	Spain
1919	Florida Pebble Strike	Mulberry, Florida	United States
1919	Boston cigar makers' strike of 1919	Boston	United States
1919	1919 Actors' Equity Association strike	nationwide	United States
1919	Los Angeles streetcar strike of 1919	Los Angeles, California	United States
1919	1919 Actors' Equity Association strike	New York City	United States
1919	Boston Police Strike	Boston, Massachusetts	United States
1919	Steel strike of 1919	Homestead, Pennsylvania	United States
1919	Coal strike	nationwide	United States

==== 1920s ====
Date	Strike	Place	Country
1920	Battle of Matewan	Matewan, West Virginia	United States
1920	1920 Alabama coal strike	Alabama	United States
1920	1920 French railway strikes	nationwide	France
1920	Denver streetcar strike of 1920	Denver, Colorado	United States
1920	Oahu sugar strike of 1920	Oahu, Hawaii	Territory of Hawaii
1921	Kronstadt rebellion	Kronstadt	Russian SFSR
1921	Black Friday (1921) (expected strike not called)	nationwide	United Kingdom
1921	Battle of Blair Mountain	Logan County, West Virginia	United States
1922	New England Textile Strike	Northeast	United States
1922	UMW General coal strike	nationwide	United States
1922	Herrin massacre	Herrin, Illinois	United States
1922	Great Railroad Strike of 1922	nationwide	United States
1922	1922 seamen's strike	citywide	Hong Kong
1923	Great Strike of 7 February	Beijing–Hankou railway	Republic of China
1923	1923 San Pedro maritime strike	San Pedro, Los Angeles, California	United States
1923	1923 Victorian police strike	Melbourne, Victoria	Australia
1924	Hanapepe massacre	Kauaʻi, Hawaii	United States
1925	Ammanford anthracite strike	Ammanford, Carmarthenshire	Wales
1925–1926	Canton-Hong Kong strike	Guangzhou and Hong Kong	China and Hong Kong
1926	1926 United Kingdom general strike	Nationwide	United Kingdom
1926	1926 Passaic textile strike	Passaic, New Jersey	United States
1927	1927 Indiana bituminous strike	nationwide	United States
1927	Columbine Mine massacre	Serene, Colorado	United States
1928	1928 New Bedford textile strike	New Bedford, Massachusetts	United States
1928	Banana massacre	nationwide	Colombia
1929	1929 Australian timber workers' strike	nationwide	Australia
1929	Lupeni Strike of 1929	Lupeni, Harghita	Romania
1929	1929 New Orleans streetcar strike	New Orleans, Louisiana	United States
1929	Rothbury Riot	North Rothbury, New South Wales	Australia
1929	Loray Mill strike	Gastonia, North Carolina	United States

==== 1930s ====
Date	Strike	Place	Country
1930	Imperial Valley lettuce strike of 1930	Imperial Valley, California	United States
1930	Phú Riềng Đỏ	Biên Hòa Province	French Indochina
1931	Tampa cigar makers' strike of 1931	Tampa, Florida	United States
1931	Santa Clara cannery strike	Santa Clara, California	United States
1931	Ådalen shootings	Ådalen	Sweden
1931	Harlan County War	Harlan County, Kentucky	United States
1931	Invergordon Mutiny	Invergordon	United Kingdom
1932	Shunjuen Incident	Tokyo	Japan
1932	Century Airlines pilots' strike	Chicago, Illinois	United States
1932	Ford Hunger March	Detroit, Michigan	United States
1932	Griviţa strike of 1933	Bucharest	Romania
1933	Briggs Manufacturing Company strike	Detroit, Michigan	United States
1933	1933 Funsten Nut strike	Greater St. Louis	United States
1933	California agricultural strikes of 1933	California	United States
1934	Kohler strike	Sheboygan, Wisconsin	United States
1934	1934 New York hotel strike	New York City	United States
1934	Auto-Lite strike	Toledo, Ohio	United States
1934	Minneapolis general strike of 1934	Minneapolis, Minnesota	United States
1934	1934 West Coast waterfront strike	U.S. West Coast	United States
1934	United Fruit banana strike	nationwide	Costa Rica
1934	Textile workers' strike (1934)	New England, Mid-Atlantic region and U.S. southern states	United States
1934	Asturian miners' strike of 1934	Asturia	Spain
1934–35	1934–35 Milwaukee sales clerks' strike	Milwaukee	United States
1935	Battle of Ballantyne Pier	Vancouver, British Columbia	Canada
1935	Copperbelt strike (1935)	Copperbelt Province	Northern Rhodesia
1935	Pacific Northwest lumber strike	U.S. Pacific Northwest	United States
1935	On-to-Ottawa Trek	Vancouver, British Columbia	Canada
1935	1935 Gulf Coast longshoremen's strike	U.S. Gulf Coast	United States
1936	1936 Venezuelan oil strike	nationwide	Venezuela
1936	Flint sit-down strike	Flint, Michigan	United States
1936	Gulf Coast maritime workers' strike	U.S. Gulf Coast	United States
1936	SS California strike	San Pedro, Los Angeles	United States
1936–37	Remington Rand strike of 1936–1937	New York City	United States
1937	1937 timber worker strikes	Northern Minnesota	United States
1937	1937 Fleischer Studios strike	New York City	United States
1937	Little Steel strike including Memorial Day massacre of 1937	nationwide	United States
1937	1937 Lewiston–Auburn shoe strike	Lewiston, Maine and Auburn, Maine	United States
1937	London busmen's strike	London	United Kingdom
1938	1938 San Antonio pecan shellers strike	San Antonio	United States
1938	Hilo massacre	Hilo, Hawaii	Territory of Hawaii
1939	Tool and die strike of 1939	Detroit, Michigan	United States

==== 1940s ====
Date	Strike	Place	Country
1941	February Strike	nationwide	Netherlands
1941	Norway theatre strike	Oslo, Bergen, Trondheim	German-occupied Norway
1941	Disney animators' strike	Burbank, California	United States
1941	Milk strike	Oslo	German-occupied Norway
1942	1942 Betteshanger miners' strike	Betteshanger, Kent	United Kingdom
1942	Quit India movement	nationwide	India
1942–44	1942-44 musicians' strike	nationwide	United States
1943	March 1943 strikes in Italy	northern industrial cities	Italy
1943	1943 Akron rubber strike	Akron, Ohio	
1943	1943 Rolls-Royce strike	Hillington, Scotland	United Kingdom
1944	Philadelphia Transit Strike	Philadelphia, Pennsylvania	United States
1944	Port Chicago mutiny	Port Chicago, California	United States
1945	Hollywood Black Friday	Hollywood, Los Angeles	United States
1945–46	Strike wave of 1946	nationwide	United States
1945–46	1945–1946 Charleston Cigar Factory strike	Charleston, South Carolina	United States
1946	African Mine Workers' Strike	nationwide	South Africa
1946	1946 Montreal Cotton Strike	Montreal, Quebec	Canada
1946	1946 Pilbara strike	Pilbara	Western Australia
1946	1945–1946 Yale and Towne strike	Stamford, Connecticut	UNited States
1946	The Great Hawaiian Sugar Strike of 1946	Hawaii nationwide	Territory of Hawaii
1946	1946 Palestine general strike	nationwide	Mandatory Palestine
1947	Biratnagar Jute Mill Strike	Biratnagar	Kingdom of Nepal
1947	Telephone Strike	nationwide	United States
1948	1948 Queensland Railway strike	Queensland	Australia
1948	1948 United States Meatpacking strike	nationwide	United States
1948	Goodyear strike	Akron, Ohio	United States
1948	1948 Caterpillar strike	Peoria, Illinois	United States
1948	1948 Boeing strike	Seattle, Washington	United States
1948	1948 Miami Garment workers strike	Miami, Florida	United States
1949	Asbestos Strike	Asbestos, Quebec	Canada
1949	1949 Calvary Cemetery strike	New York City	United States
1949	1949 East German State Railway strike	Berlin	East Germany
1949	1949 New York City taxicab strike	New York City	United States
1949	1949 New York City brewery strike	New York City	United States
1949	1949 Australian coal strike	nationwide	Australia
1949	1949 Kemi strike	Kemi	Finland
1949	Puget Sound fishermen's strike of 1949	Puget Sound, Washington	United States

==== 1950s ====
Date	Strike	Place	Country
1950	1950 Venezuelan oil strike	nationwide	Venezuela
1950	Atlanta transit strike of 1950	Atlanta	United States
1951	New Zealand waterfront strike	nationwide	New Zealand
1951	Barcelona tram strike	Barcelona, Catalonia	Spain
1951	1951 Aliquippa steelworkers strike	Aliquippa, Pennsylvania	United States
1951	1951 Caterpillar strike	East Peoria, Illinois	United States
1952	1952 steel strike	nationwide	United States
1953	1953 Milwaukee brewery strike	Milwaukee	United States
1953	The Hartal of 1953	nationwide	Sri Lanka
1955	Hock Lee bus riots	Singapore	Republic of Singapore
1956	Poznań protests of 1956	Cegielski Factories	Polish People's Republic
1957	Murdochville strike	Murdochville, Quebec	Canada
1957	1957 Long Island strike	Long Island, New York	United States
1957	1957 Western Electric strike	nationwide	United States
1958–59	1958–59 Mexican railroad strike	nationwide	Mexico
1959	Steel strike of 1959	nationwide	United States

==== 1960s ====
Date	Strike	Place	Country
1960	1960 Writers Guild of America strike	Hollywood, Los Angeles	United States
1960	Miike Struggle	Ōmuta, Fukuoka and Arao, Kumamoto	Japan
1962	1962 New York City newspaper strike	New York City	United States
1962	Novocherkassk strike	Novocherkassk Electric Locomotive Plant	Soviet Union
1963	Reesor Siding Strike of 1963	Reesor, Ontario	Canada
1964	1964 Mount Isa Mines Strike	Mount Isa, Queensland	Australia
1964–65	1964–1965 Scripto strike	Atlanta	United States
1965–70	Delano grape strike	Delano, California	United States
1966	1966 New York City transit strike	New York City	United States
1966–73	Gurindji strike	Kalkarindji, Northern Territory	Australia
1966	Texas farm workers' strike	Texas	United States
1966–67	St. John's University strike of 1966–67	New York City	United States
1967	1967 United States truckers strike	nationwide	United States
1967	Hong Kong 1967 Leftist Riots	citywide	British Hong Kong
1967	1967 United States Railroad strike	nationwide	United States
1967	September 1967 General Motors strike	Dayton, Ohio	United States
1967	1967 Caterpillar strike	Colorado, Illinois, Iowa, Ohio and Pennsylvania	United States
1967	November 1967 General Motors strike	Pontiac, Michigan	United States
1968	May 1968 in France	nationwide	France
1968	Memphis sanitation strike	Memphis, Tennessee	United States
1968	Chrysler wildcat strike	Detroit, Michigan	United States
1968	New York City Teacher's Strike of 1968	New York City	United States
1968	Florida statewide teachers' strike of 1968	Florida	United States
1968	1968 NFL strike/lockout	Florida	United States
1969	Unofficial strike by mineworkers over pay of surface workers	nationwide	United Kingdom

==== 1970s ====
Date	Strike	Place	Country
1970	Dock Workers Strike	Nationwide	United Kingdom
1970	U.S. Postal Service strike of 1970	nationwide	United States
1970	1970 Minneapolis teachers' strike	Minneapolis	United States
1970–71	Colour Strike	nationwide	United Kingdom
1970–71	Salad Bowl strike	nationwide	United States
1971	1971 NYPD Work Stoppage	New York City	United States
1971	Longshore Strike (1971, U.S.)	U.S. West Coast Hawaii and British Columbia	United States and Canada
1971	1971 United Kingdom postal workers strike	nationwide	United Kingdom
1972	1972 Major League Baseball strike	nationwide	United States
1972	UK building workers' strike (1972)	Shrewsbury, Shropshire	United Kingdom
1972	1972 United Kingdom miners' strike	nationwide	United Kingdom
1972	Chile truckers' strike	nationwide	Chile
1973	Cowper Street school strike	Chapeltown, Leeds	United Kingdom
1973	1973 New York City gravediggers' strike	New York City	United States
1973	1973 Philadelphia teachers strike	Philadelphia	United States
1973	1973 Kings Cross strippers' strike	Kings Cross, New South Wales	Australia
1973	1973 Durban strikes	Natal	South Africa
1973	1973 Chicago teachers strike	Chicago	United States
1973	1973 Cleveland teachers strike	Cleveland	United States
1973	1973 Pennsylvania Central Transportation strike	Northeastern United States	United States
1973	1973 Detroit teachers strike	Detroit	United States
1973	1973 Chrysler strike	nationwide	United States
1973	1973 Caterpillar strike	nationwide	United States
1974	1974 railway strike in India by 17 million workers of Indian Railways	nationwide	India
1974	1974 Elliot Lake miners strike	Elliot Lake	Canada
1974	Bituminous Coal Strike of 1974	nationwide	United States
1974	Ulster Workers' Council Strike	nationwide	Northern Ireland
1974	UK miners' strike (1974)	nationwide	United Kingdom
1974	1974 NFL strike	nationwide	United States
1976–77	Grunwick Dispute	London	England
1977	1977 Atlanta sanitation strike	Atlanta	United States
1977	1977 Latrobe Valley power strike	Victoria	Australia
1977–78	Bituminous Coal Strike of 1977–1978	nationwide	United States
1977–78	1977–78 Coors strike	Golden, Colorado	United States
1978	1978 Memphis fire and police strikes	Memphis, Tennessee	United States
1978	1978 New York City newspaper strike	New York City	United States
1978	Sudbury Strike of 1978	Sudbury, Ontario	Canada
1978–79	Winter of Discontent	nationwide	United Kingdom
1979	1979 Boston University strike	Boston	United States
1979	1979 New York prison guards' strike	New York	United States

==== 1980s ====
Date	Strike	Place	Country
1980	1980 Lublin strikes	Lublin	Poland
1980	Gdańsk Shipyard Strike	Gdańsk	Poland
1980	Upper Silesia 1980 strikes	Jastrzębie-Zdrój	Poland
1980	1980 actors strike	nationwide (primarily Hollywood)	United States
1981	1981 Schlitz strike	Milwaukee	United States
1981	Air traffic controllers' strike/Professional Air Traffic Controllers Organization	nationwide	United States
1981	Bydgoszcz events	Bydgoszcz	Poland
1981	1981 Writers Guild of America strike	Hollywood, Los Angeles	United States
1981	1981 Major League Baseball strike	nationwide	United States
1981	1981 strike at the Piast Coal Mine in Bieruń	Bieruń	Poland
1981	1981 Milwaukee Police strike	Milwaukee	United States
1981	Lee Factory sit-in	Greenock	Scotland
1982	Great Bombay textile strike	Mumbai	India
1982	1982 animators' strike	Greater Los Angeles	United States
1982	1982 NFL strike	nationwide	United States
1982	1982 garment workers' strike	New York City	United States
1983	1983 SEPTA Regional Rail strike	Greater Philadelphia	United States
1983	Arizona Copper Mine Strike of 1983	Greenlee County, Arizona	United States
1983	1983 Greyhound Bus Lines strike in Seattle	Seattle	United States
1984	Battle of Orgreave	Orgreave, South Yorkshire	England
1984	1984 Marval turkey strike	Dayton, Virginia	United States
1984	1984 Disneyland strike	Anaheim, California	United States
1984	Cammell Laird Shipyard Occupation	Birkenhead	United Kingdom
1984–85	1984–1985 United Kingdom miners' strike	nationwide	United Kingdom
1985	1985 Pan Am strike	nationwide	United States
1985–86	1985–86 Hormel strike	Austin, Minnesota	United States
1985–87	1985–1987 Watsonville Cannery strike	Watsonville, California	United States
1985–86	1985–1986 New Bedford fishermen's strike	New Bedford, Massachusetts	United States
1985	Mudginberri dispute	Northern Territory	Australia
1985	1985 Major League Baseball strike	nationwide	United States and Canada
1986	Dollar Sweets dispute	State of Victoria	Australia
1986	Guilford Transportation Industries railroad workers' strike	North Billerica, Massachusetts	United States
1986	Major Indoor Soccer League lockout	nationwide	United States
1986	Wapping dispute	London	England
1987	International Paper strike	Corinth, New York	United States
1987	1987 NFL strike	nationwide	United States
1987	Metro Toronto Elementary Teacher's Strike	Toronto, Ontario	Canada
1988	1988 Writers Guild of America strike	Hollywood, Los Angeles	United States
1988	1988 Polish strikes	nationwide	Poland
1988	1988 United Kingdom postal workers strike	nationwide	United Kingdom
1989	1989 Kosovo miners' strike	SAP Kosovo	SFR Yugoslavia
1989	1989 Australian pilots' strike	nationwide	Australia
1989–90	Pittston Coal strike	Pittston, Pennsylvania	United States
1989–93	Donbas miners' strikes	Ukrainian SSR	Soviet Union
1989–90	1989–90 British ambulance strike	Nationwide	United Kingdom

==== 1990s ====
Date	Strike	Place	Country
1990	1990 West Virginia teachers' strike	West Virginia	United States
1990	1990 Major League Baseball lockout	nationwide	United States
1990	1990 Norwegian oil workers' strike	North Sea	Norway
1990	1990 Delta Pride strike	Sunflower County, Mississippi	United States
1990	Mandal Commission protests of 1990 (India, 1990)	Mandal	India
1991	Frontier Hotel Culinary Workes (Las Vegas, US 1991–1998)	Las Vegas	United States
1991	1991 Belarusian strikes	Byelorussian Soviet Socialist Republic	Soviet Union
1991	1991 Public Service Alliance of Canada Strike	Ottawa	Canada
1992	1992 United States railroad strike	nationwide	United States
1992	1992 NHL strike	nationwide	Canada and United States
1992	Southern California drywall strike	Southern California	United States
1993	Timex strike	Dundee	Scotland
1994–95	1994–95 Major League Baseball strike	nationwide	Canada and United States
1994–95	1994–95 NHL lockout	nationwide	Canada and United States
1994	San Francisco newspaper strike of 1994	San Francisco, California	United States
1995	1995 Boeing strike	Washington State (Everett/Seattle/Renton)	United States
1995–97	Detroit newspaper strike	Detroit, Michigan	United States
1995	1995 strikes in France	nationwide	France
1995	1995 NBA lockout	nationwide	Canada and United States
1995–98	Liverpool dockers' strike (1995–98)	Liverpool, Merseyside	England
1996	1996 NBA lockout	nationwide	Canada and United States
1996–97	1996–1997 strikes in South Korea	nationwide	South Korea
1996–97	1996 NBA lockout	nationwide	Canada and United States
1996–97	Donbas miners' strikes	Donbas	Ukraine
1997	1997 UPS Strike (U.S.)	nationwide	United States
1997	1997 Ontario teachers strike	Ontario	Canada
1998	1998 Australian waterfront dispute	Melbourne, Brisbane, Fremantle and Sydney	Australia
1998	1998 Russian miners' strike	Komi Republic, Kemerovo Oblast, Rostov Oblast	Russia
1998	Donbas miners' strikes	Luhansk Oblast	Ukraine
1998–99	1998–99 NBA lockout	nationwide	Canada and United States
1999	1999 CBC strike	nationwide	Canada
1999	1999 UNAM strike	Mexico City	Mexico

=== Twenty-first century ===
==== 2000s ====
Date	Strike	Place	Country
2000	Verizon Strike	nationwide	United States
2000	2000 commercial actors strike	Hollywood	United States
2001	Jeffboat wildcat strike	Jeffersonville, Indiana	United States
2001	National Gallery of Canada	Ottawa, Ontario	Canada
2001–2003	Friction Dynamics - T&G Union	Caernarfon, Wales	United Kingdom
2002	UK Firefighter strike 2002	nationwide	United Kingdom
2003	Scottish Nursery Nurses Strike	nationwide	Scotland
2003	2003 Broadway Musicians Strike	New York City	United States
2003	2003 June 15 Hospitality workers at the Congress Plaza Hotel.	Chicago, Illinois	United States
2003–2004	Southern California supermarket strike of 2003–2004	Southern California	United States
2004–2005	2004–05 NHL lockout	nationwide	United States and Canada
2005	Bolivian Gas War	nationwide	Bolivia
2005	2005 New York City transit strike	New York City	United States
2006	Dhaka strikes	Dhaka	Bangladesh
2006	2006 labor protests in France	nationwide	France
2006	2006 Oaxaca protests	Oaxaca	Mexico
2006	2006 Progressive Enterprises dispute	Auckland, Palmerston North and Christchurch	New Zealand
2006	South Korean railroad strike of 2006	nationwide	South Korea
2006	2006 Toronto Transit Commission wildcat strike	Toronto, Ontario	Canada
2006	University of Miami Justice for Janitors campaign	Coral Gables, Florida	United States
2007	2007 Freightliner wildcat strike	Portland, Oregon	United States
2007	2007 South African public servants' strike	nationwide	South Africa
2007	2007 Israeli teachers' strike	nationwide	Israel
2007	2007 Orange County transit strike	Orange, California	United States
2007	Hayward teachers strike	Hayward, California	United States
2007	2007 General Motors strike	Detroit, Michigan	United States
2007	2007 UK postal strikes	nationwide	United Kingdom
2007	2007 Broadway Stagehand Strike	New York City	United States
2007	November 2007 strikes in France	nationwide	France
2007	German national rail strike of 2007	nationwide	Germany
2007	2007 South Africa miners' strike	nationwide	South Africa
2007–2008	2007–2008 CBS News writers strike	New York City	United States
2007–2008	2007–2008 Cork players strike	County Cork	Ireland
2007–2008	2007–2008 Writers Guild of America strike	Hollywood, Los Angeles	United States
2007–2008	2007–2008 Berlitz Japan Strike	Aoyama, Tokyo	Japan
2008	2008 British teacher's strike	nationwide	England
2008	2008 Toronto Transit Commission strike	Toronto, Ontario	Canada
2008	2008 VIVA bus operators strike	nationwide	Canada
2008	2008 Boeing machinists' strike	Seattle, Washington	United States
2008–2009	2008–2009 York University strike	York, Ontario	Canada
2008–2009	Istanbul metalworkers' strike of 2008–2009	Istanbul	Turkey
2009	2009 Lindsey Oil Refinery strikes	North Killingholme, Lincolnshire	England
2009	Tonghua Iron and Steel Group riot	Tonghua, Jilin	China
2009	2009 City of Toronto inside and outside workers strike	Toronto, Ontario	Canada
2009	2009 Leeds refuse workers strike	City of Leeds West Yorkshire	England
2009	2009 UK postal strikes	nationwide	United Kingdom

==== 2010s ====
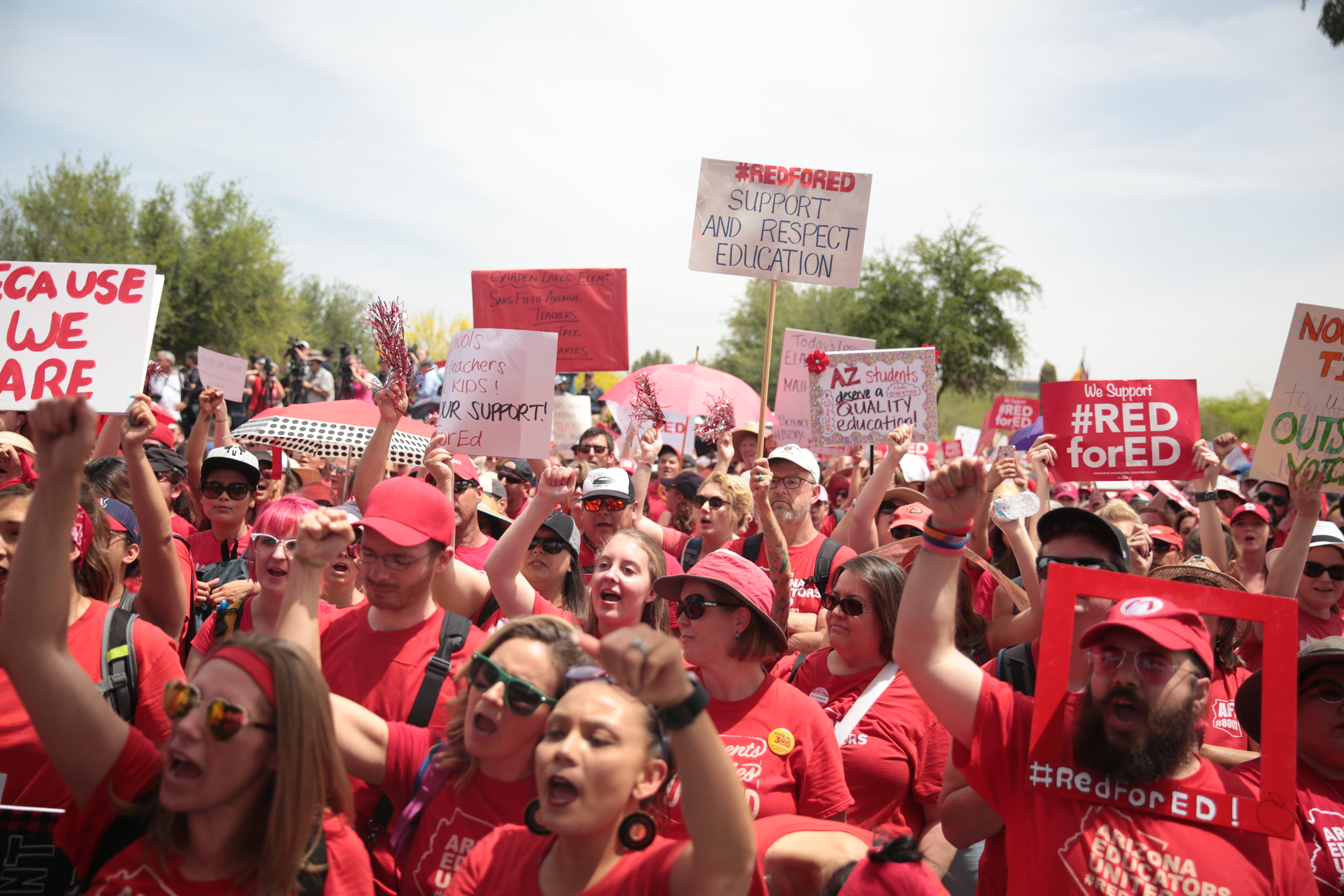
Arizona teachers' strike, 26 April 2018

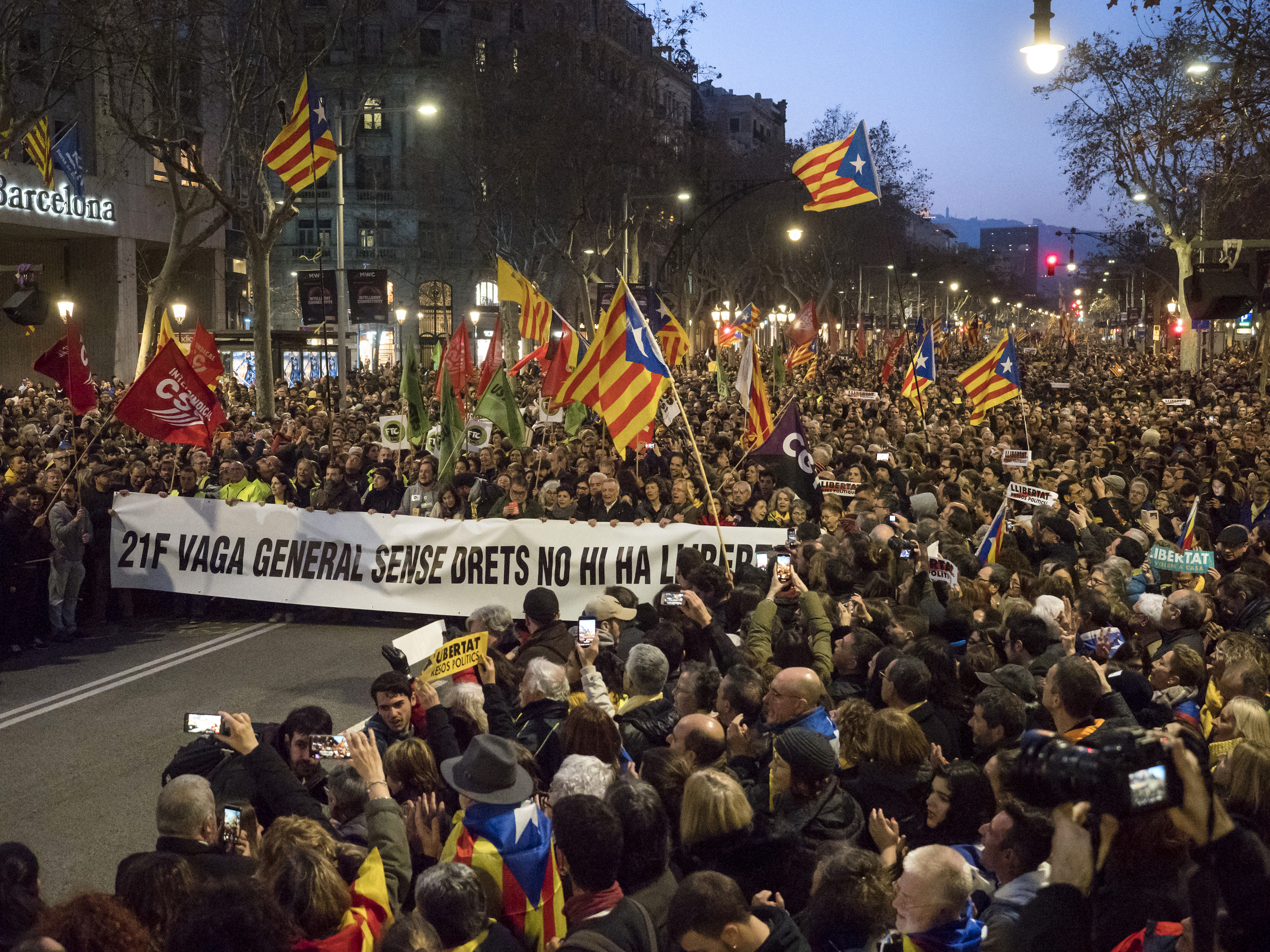
General strike in Catalonia, 21 February 2019

Date	Strike	Place	Country
2010	2010 University of Puerto Rico Strike	San Juan	Puerto Rico
2010	2010 Chinese autoworkers strike	Foshan and Zhongshan	China
2010	2010 Chinese labour unrest	nationwide	China
2010	2010 Cambodian garment workers strike	Phnom Phen	Cambodia
2010	2010 Scottish football referee strike	nationwide	Scotland
2010	2010 Spanish air traffic controllers strike	nationwide	Spain
2010	2010 Major League Soccer lockout/strike	nationwide	United States
2010	2010 Georgia prison strike	Georgia	United States
2010–2011	2010–2011 Hanjin Heavy Industries strike	nationwide	South Korea and the Philippines
2011	2011 Shanghai Truckers strike	Shanghai	China
2011	2011 NBA lockout	nationwide	United States and Canada
2011	2011 NFL lockout	nationwide	United States
2011	Zhanaozen massacre	Mangystau Region	Kazakhstan
2011	2011 Israeli doctors' strike	nationwide	Israel
2012	2012 NFL referee lockout	nationwide	United States
2012–13	2012–13 NHL lockout	nationwide	United States and Canada
2012	2012 Ports of Los Angeles and Long Beach strike	Los Angeles and Long Beach, California	United States
2013	2013 Southern Weekly incident	Guangzhou, Guangdong	China
2013	2013 Hong Kong dock strike	citywide	Hong Kong
2013	2013 Colombian miners strike	Northern Colombia	Colombia
2014	Chinese Golf Factory Workers Strike for Essential Rights	Shenzhen	China
2014	Tacoma nurses strike 2014	Tacoma and Lakewood, Washington	United States
2014	2014 South African platinum strike	nationwide	South Africa
2015	2015 United Steel Workers Oil Refinery Strike	California, Indiana, Kentucky, Ohio, Texas and Washington	United States
2015	2015 Kohler Strike	Kohler, Wisconsin	United States
2016	2016 Verizon workers' strike	New York City	United States
2016–2017	2016–2017 video game voice actor strike	Los Angeles, California	United States
2017	2017 Philippine jeepney drivers' strike	nationwide	Philippines
2018–2019	2018–2019 teachers' strikes in the United States	nationwide	United States
2018	2018 York University strike: Teaching Assistants, Graduate Assistant, Research Assistant, and Contract Faculty Strike	York, Ontario	Canada
2018	2018 Taylorsville Georgia-Pacific strike	Taylorsville, Mississippi	United States
2018	2018 DeKalb County School District bus drivers' strike	DeKalb County, Georgia	United States
2018	Brazil truck drivers' strike	nationwide	Brazil
2018	Marriott Hotels strike	Bethesda, Maryland	United States
2018	Jasic incident	Shenzhen, Guangdong	China
2018–2019	2018–2019 education workers' strikes in the United States	nationwide	United States
2018	2018 Alabama Coca-Cola strike	Alabama and Mississippi	United States
2018	2018 Atlanta sanitation strike	Atlanta	United States
2018–present	School strike for climate	worldwide	global
2018	2018–2020 UK higher education strikes	nationwide	United Kingdom
2019	2019 Los Angeles Unified School District teachers' strike	Los Angeles County, California	United States
2019	Wright State University 2019 faculty strike	Dayton, Ohio	United States
2019	2019 Portuguese fuel-tanker drivers' strike	nationwide	Portugal
2019	2019 Stop & Shop strike	Massachusetts, Rhode Island and Connecticut	United States
2019	2019 India doctors' strike	West Bengal	India
2019	2019 Alaska ferry workers strike	Alaska	United States
2019	2019 AT&T strike	Southern United States	United States
2019–2020	2019–2020 French pension reform strike	nationwide	France

==== 2020s ====
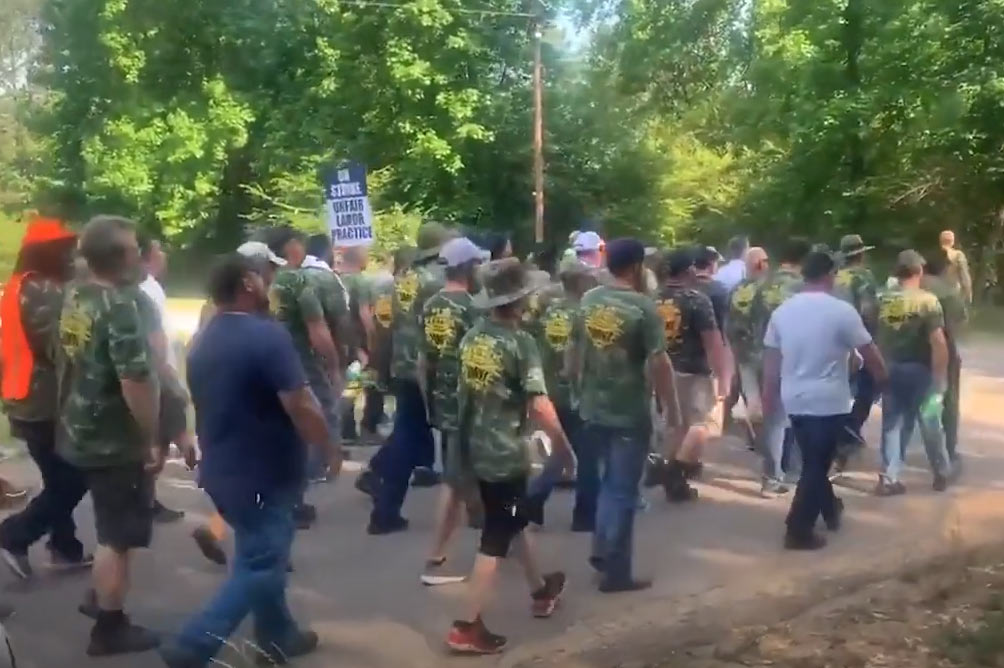
Protestors during the 2021 Warrior Met Coal strike

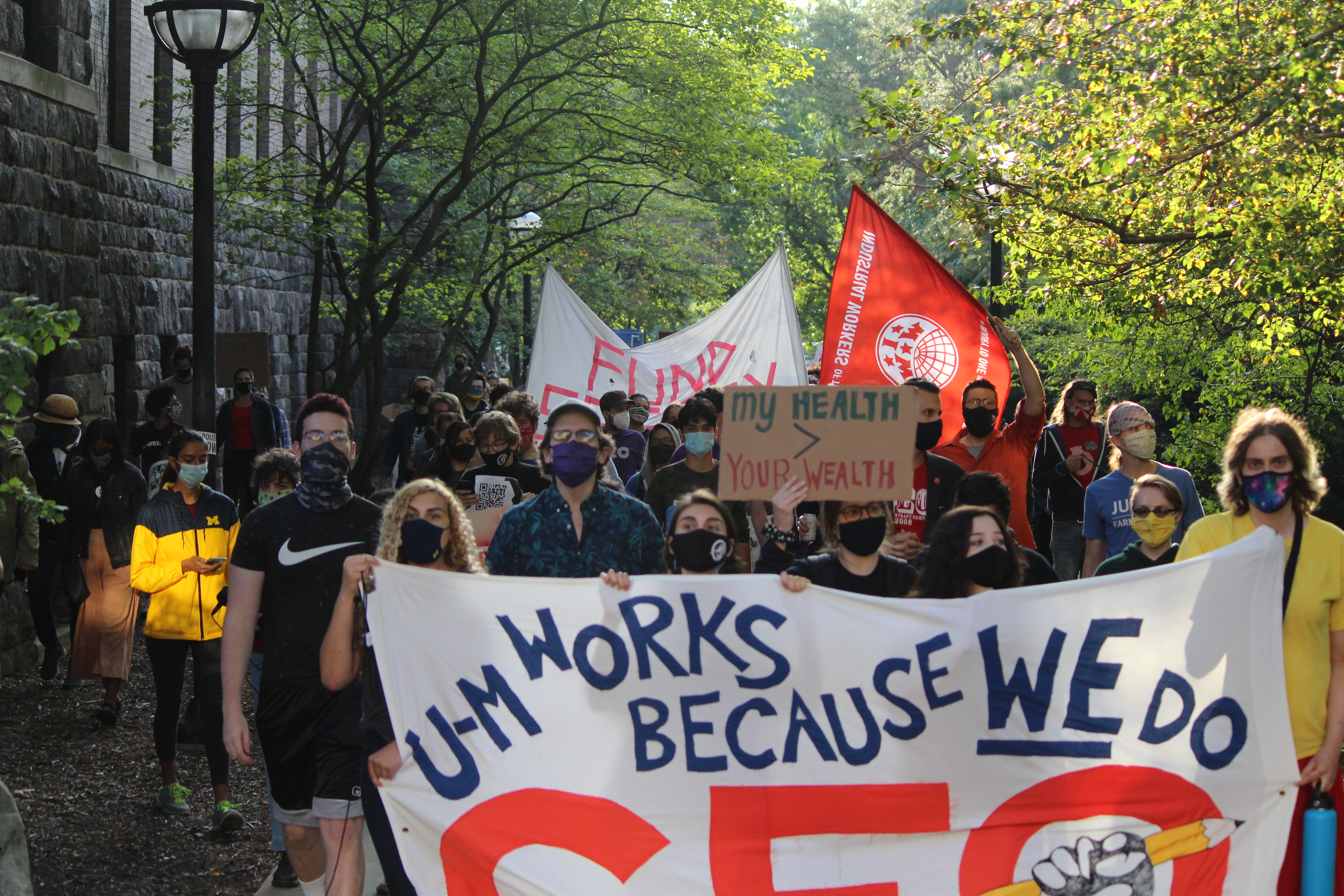
2020 Michigan graduate students strike, 11 September

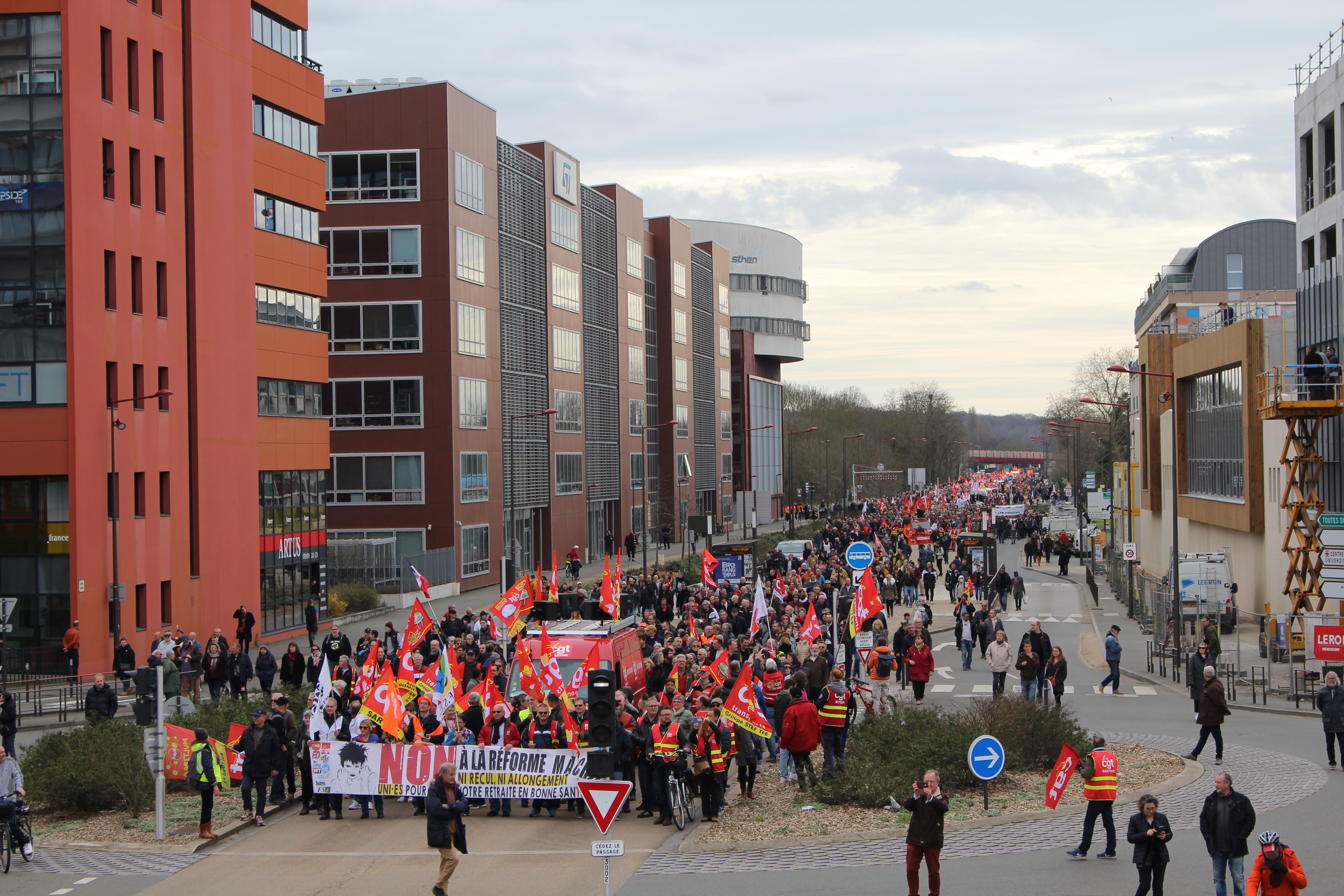
2023 French pension reform strikes, 15 March

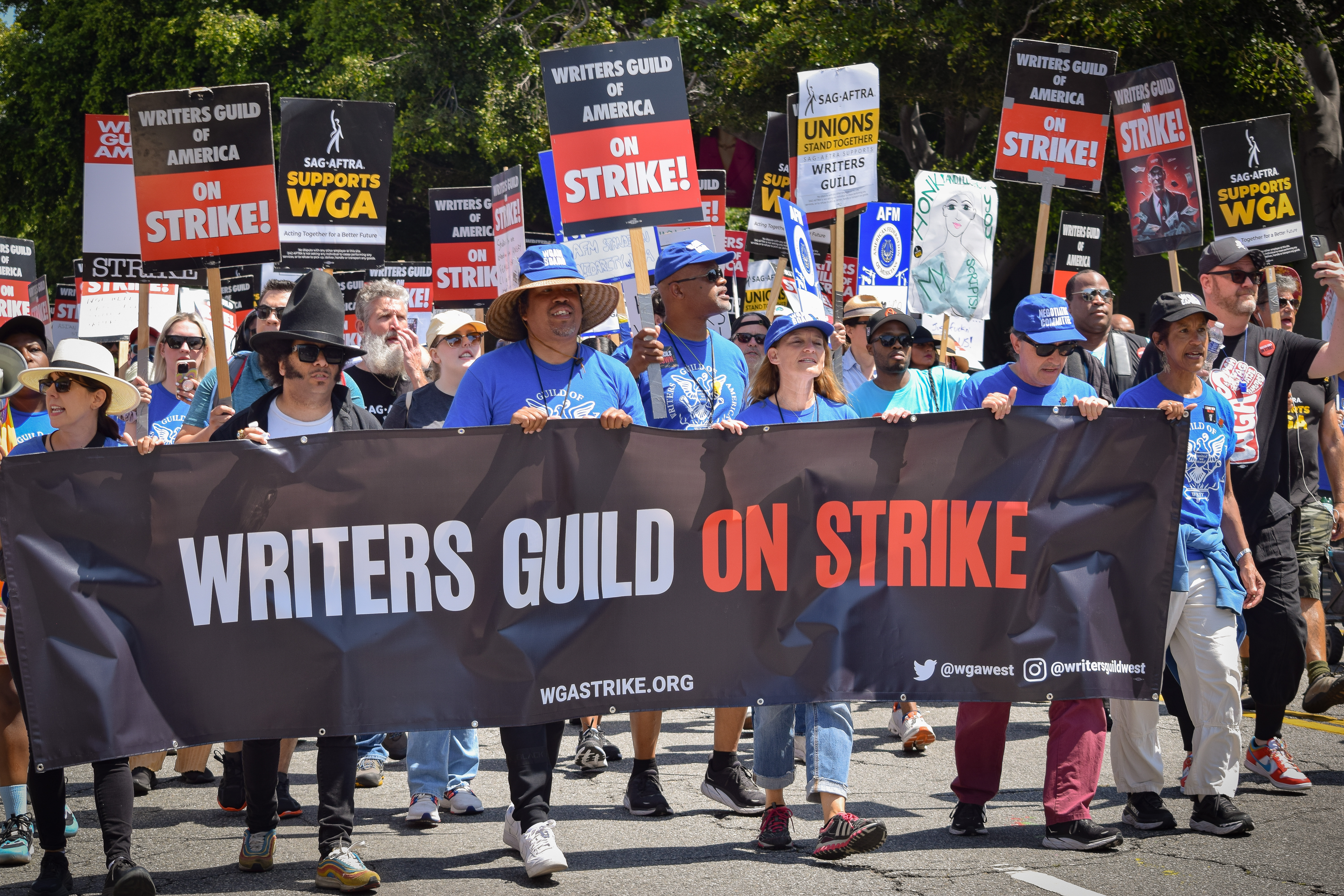
2023 Writers Guild of America strike, 21 June

Date	Strike	Place	Country
2020	2020 Santa Cruz graduate students' strike	Santa Cruz, California	United States
2020	2020 New Orleans sanitation strike	New Orleans	United States
2020	2020 Bath shipbuilders strike	Bath, Maine	United States
2020	2020 Ukrainian miners' strikes	Nationwide	Ukraine
2020	Strike for Black Lives	Nationwide	United States
2020	2020 Port of Montreal strike	Montreal	Canada
2020	2020 Michigan graduate students strike	Ann Arbor, Michigan	United States
2020	2020 University of Illinois Hospital strikes	Chicago	United States
2020–2021	2020–2021 Alabama aluminum plant strike	Muscle Shoals, Alabama	United States
2021	2021 Hunts Point Produce Market strike	New York City	United States
2021	2021 French labor protests	Nationwide	France
2021	2021 St. Paul Park refinery strike	St. Paul Park, Minnesota	United States
2021	2021 Go North West strike	Manchester	United Kingdom
2021	2021 St. Charles Bend strike	Bend, Oregon	United States
2021	2021 Saint Vincent Hospital strike	Worcester, Massachusetts	United States
2021–2022	2021–2022 Columbia University strike	New York City	United States
2021	2021 Allegheny Technologies strike	Northern United States	United States
2021	2021 New York University strike	New York City	United States
2021–2023	2021–2023 Warrior Met Coal strike	Alabama	United States
2021	2021 Minas Gerais prostitute strike	Minas Gerais	Brazil
2021	2021 Virginia Volvo Trucks strike	Dublin, Virginia	United States
2021	2021 Oregon Tech strike	Oregon	United States
2021	2021 Cook County nurses strike	Cook County, Illinois	United States
2021	2021 Frito-Lay strike	Topeka, Kansas	United States
2021	2021 Nigerian doctors strike	Nationwide	Nigeria
2021	2021 Nabisco strike	Nationwide	United States
2021	2021 Heaven Hill strike	Bardstown, Kentucky	United States
2021	2021 Washington state carpenters strike	Washington	United States
2021	2021 Mercy Hospital strike	Buffalo, New York	United States
2021	2021 Kellogg's strike	Nationwide	United States
2021	2021 John Deere strike	Nationwide	United States
2021	2021 Kaiser Permanente strike	Nationwide	United States
2022	2022 UPM Paperworkers' strike	Nationwide	Finland
2022	2022 Minneapolis teacher's strike	Minneapolis	United States
2022	2022 University of California academic workers' strike	California	United States
2022	2022 British barristers' industrial action	Nationwide	United Kingdom
2022	2022 BT Group strikes	Nationwide	United Kingdom
2022	2022 Scotland bin strikes	Scotland	United Kingdom
2022–2024	2022–2024 United Kingdom railway strikes	Nationwide	United Kingdom
2022–present	United Kingdom industrial disputes and strikes (2022–present)	Nationwide	United Kingdom
2022–2023	2022–2023 National Health Service strikes	Nationwide	United Kingdom
2022–2023	2022–2023 United Kingdom postal workers strikes	Nationwide	United Kingdom
2022–2023	2022–2023 HarperCollins strike	New York City	United States
2023	2023 transport strike in the Philippines	Nationwide	Philippines
2023	University of Prince Edward Island faculty strike	Canada	
2023	2023 French pension reform strikes	Nationwide	France
2023	2023 German public transport strike	Nationwide	Germany
2023	2023 Temple University strike	Philadelphia	United States
2023	2023 Rutgers University strike	New Jersey	United States
2023	2023 Canadian federal worker strike	Nationwide	Canada
2023	2023 Writers Guild of America strike	Hollywood	United States
2023	2023 Romanian teachers' strike	Nationwide	Romania
2023	2023 Manitoba Public Insurance Strike	Manitoba	Canada
2023	2023 SAG-AFTRA strike	Hollywood	United States
2023	2023 United Auto Workers strike	Nationwide	United States
2024	2024 Boeing machinists' strike	Seattle	United States
2024	2024 United States port strike	East and Gulf Coast	United States
2024	2024 Canada Post strike	Nationwide	Canada
2025	2025 New York corrections officers' strike	New York	United States
2025	2025 Air Canada flight attendants strike	Worldwide	Canada
2025	2025 Boeing machinists' strike	St. Louis Metropolitan Area, Missouri/Illinois	United States
2025	2025 Alberta teachers' strike	Alberta	Canada
2026	2026 New York City nurses strike	New York City	United States
2026	Orange County Teamsters Local 952 strike	Orange County,California	United States

== Chronological list of general strikes ==
Date	Name	Place	Country	
1820	Radical War	Central Belt, Scotland	United Kingdom	Influenced by Radical demands for reform, especially among Scottish weavers
1835	Philadelphia general strike of 1835	Philadelphia, Pennsylvania	United States	Successful strike for a ten-hour work day and better wages
1842	General Strike of 1842	England and Wales	United Kingdom	Chartist general strike against low wages originating from coal miners in Staffordshire before spreading to multiple industries in the Midlands as well as coal mines across the country.
1855	1855 Catalan general strike	Catalonia	Spain	
1862–1865	General strike of slaves	Nationwide	Confederate States of America	Slaves in the Southern United States stopped work and attempted to cross the frontlines of the American Civil War into Union territory, in what W.E.B. Du Bois held to be a crucial turning point in the war.
1877	Great Railroad Strike of 1877	West Virginia, Maryland, New York, Pennsylvania, Illinois, Missouri	United States	Strike by rail workers in a number of different states for wage increases; ended after 52 days with a suppression by the National Guard and local militias
1886	Walloon jacquerie of 1886	Wallonia	Belgium	
1890	Tarapacá general strike of 1890	Iquique	Chile	Unsuccessful strike by day laborers, sailors, and saltpeter workers for better wages.
1892	New Orleans general strike of 1892	New Orleans, Louisiana	United States	Successful strike for a 10-hour day and Overtime pay; notable for the participation of both white and black strikers
1893	Belgian general strike of 1893	Mons	Belgium	Strike by the Belgian Labour Party to pressure Prime Minister Auguste Beernaert's Catholic Party government to introduce universal male suffrage
1901	1901 Ybor City strikes	Ybor City, Tampa, Florida	United States	
1902	Geneva general strike of 1902	Geneva	Switzerland	
1904	1904 Italian general strike	Nationwide	Italy	
1905	1905 Russian Revolution	Nationwide	Russian Empire	General strike by workers in the industrial centres of the Russian Empire; suppressed by the Imperial Russian Army.
1907	Geneva general strike of 1907	Geneva	Switzerland	
1907	New Orleans General Levee Strike of 1907	New Orleans	United States	
1909	Tragic Week	Barcelona, Catalonia	Spain	
1909	Swedish General Strike	Nationwide	Sweden	Unsuccessful general strike called by the Swedish Trade Union Confederation
1910	Philadelphia general strike of 1910	Philadelphia, Pennsylvania	United States	Amalgamated Transit Union strike of Philadelphia Transportation Company trolley workers which expanded into a citywide American Federation of Labor general strike, eventually leading to wage increases
1912	Brisbane general strike of 1912	Brisbane, Queensland	Australia	Caused when Australian Tramway Employees Union members were dismissed for wearing union badges; ended with Queensland Police Service attacks on labor marchers in Market Square leading to a public outcry and the strengthening of the Australian labour movement
1912	Zürich general strike of 1912	Zurich	Switzerland	
1917	Australian general strike of 1917	Nationwide	Australia	
1917	Spanish general strike of 1917	Nationwide	Spain	
1917	1917–1919 Brazil strike movement	Rio de Janeiro, São Paulo and Rio Grande do Sul	Brazil	Series of general strikes leading to an attempted anarchist uprising against the First Brazilian Republic.
1917	1917 Twin Cities streetcar strike	Minneapolis–Saint Paul	United States	Sympathetic general strike held on 13 December in support of streetcar workers who had been engaged in a labor dispute for the past several weeks. Involved about 10,000 people.
1918	Irish general strike against conscription	Ireland	United Kingdom	
1918	Swiss general strike of 1918	Nationwide	Switzerland	
1918	Vancouver general strike	Vancouver, British Columbia	Canada	General strike caused by the arrest of Albert "Ginger" Goodwin, discontent over high living costs and low wages during World War I, and the October Revolution; ended with police attacks on union offices
1918	General strike of 14 October 1918	Czechoslovakia	Austria-Hungary	
1919	La Canadenca strike	Catalonia	Spain	
1919	Basel and Zürich general strike of 1919	Basel and Zurich	Switzerland	
1919	Seattle General Strike	Seattle, Washington	United States	Industrial Workers of the World strike caused when the Emergency Fleet Corporation denied shipbuilders' demands for higher wages and intended to start a socialist revolution; contributed to the First Red Scare
1919	Winnipeg general strike	Winnipeg, Manitoba	Canada	General strike ending with repression by the North-West Mounted Police but leading to the growth of the Canadian democratic socialist and labor movements.
1920	Berlin general strike	Berlin	Germany	General strike encouraged by the government to resist an attempted overthrow of the Weimar Republic
1920	Ruhr uprising	Ruhr	Germany	General strike in support of the Social Democratic government before expanding into a mass labor uprising to establish a "dictatorship of the proletariat"; suppressed by the Freikorps and the Reichswehr
1920	Romanian general strike of 1920	Nationwide	Romania	
1922	Italian general strike of 1922	Nationwide	Italy	Unsuccessful general strike intended to prevent a seizure of power by Benito Mussolini's National Fascist Party
1922	Guayaquil general strike	Guayaquil	Ecuador	
1926	United Kingdom general strike of 1926	Nationwide	United Kingdom	10-day general strike by the General Council of the Trades Union Congress to prevent wage reductions and worsened conditions for coal miners; ended without concessions or violence.
1926	Sierra Leone railway strike of 1926	Nationwide	Sierra Leone	
1927	1927 Austrian General Strike	Vienna	Austria	
1932	Geneva general strike of 1932	Geneva	Switzerland	
1933	1933 Cuban general strike	Nationwide, initially in Havana	Cuba	The strike would originally begin as a strike for bus drivers in Havana and would later grow to other sectors and spread throughout the country. The strike led to the resignation of President Gerardo Machado.
1933	1933 Ecuadorian general strike	Quito, Riobamba	Ecuador	
1933	French general strike of 1933	Nationwide	France	
1934	Portuguese general strike of 1934	Nationwide	Portugal	
1934	West Coast waterfront strike of 1934	California, Oregon and Washington	United States	83-day general strike in support of the International Longshoremen's Association during the Great Depression; the success of the strike contributed to the growth of industrial unionism under the Congress of Industrial Organizations.
1934	Minneapolis general strike of 1934	Minneapolis, Minnesota	United States	
1934	Auto-Lite strike	Toledo, Ohio	United States	
1936	French general strike of 1936	Nationwide	France	
1936	Spanish Revolution of 1936	Nationwide	Spain	
1936	1936 Syrian general strike	Nationwide	Syria	
1936	Palestinian general strike	Nationwide	Mandatory Palestine	General strike coordinated by the Arab Higher Committee against Jewish settlement in Palestine; eventually led to the 1936–1939 Arab revolt in Palestine.
1938	French general strike of 1938	Nationwide	France	
1941	February strike	Nationwide	Netherlands	
1942	Luxembourgish general strike of 1942	Nationwide	Luxembourg	Campaign of passive resistance against the Nazi occupation during World War II.
1945	Nigerian general strike of 1945	Nationwide	Nigeria	
1946	Royal Indian Navy mutiny	Nationwide	India	
1946	Oakland general strike of 1946	Oakland, California	United States	Part of the 1945–46 strike wave in the United States during the U.S. demobilization after World War II and the abolition of National War Labor Board restrictions, which contributed to the passage of the Taft–Hartley Act restricting union activities and strike actions.
1946	1945–1946 Yale and Towne strike	Stamford, Connecticut	United States	Part of the 1945–46 strike wave in the United States during the U.S. demobilization after World War II and the abolition of National War Labor Board restrictions, which contributed to the passage of the Taft–Hartley Act restricting union activities and strike actions.
1950	Austrian general strikes of 1950	Nationwide	Austria	
1950	Belgian general strike of 1950	Nationwide	Belgium	Originated over opposition to King Leopold III of Belgium being returned to throne after his refusal to leave Belgium with the government-in-exile during the Nazi occupation; ended with his agreement to abdicate and allow his son Baudouin to take the throne
1950	Nairobi general strike of 1950	Nairobi	Kenya	
1950	Positive Action campaign	Nationwide	Gold Coast	
1952	Casablanca Uprisings of 1952	Casablanca	Morocco	
1953	Ceylonese Hartal of 1953	Nationwide	Ceylon	
1953	Uprising of 1953	Nationwide	East Germany	Originated as strike by East Berlin construction workers against Sovietization work quotas before expanding to a broad revolt against the Soviet-sponsored Socialist Unity Party's rule; repressed by the Soviet Army and the Kasernierte Volkspolizei
1954	General strike of 1954	Nationwide	Honduras	
1956	Finnish general strike of 1956	Nationwide	Finland	Successful Central Organisation of Finnish Trade Unions general strike for higher wages
1960–61	Belgian general strike of 1960–61	Wallonia	Belgium	General Labour Federation of Belgium general strike against Prime Minister Gaston Eyskens's austerity policies, especially the Unitary Law; contributed to the growth of the Walloon Movement
1966	1966 Burkina Faso general strike	Nationwide	Burkina Faso	
1968	French general strike of May 1968	Nationwide	France	Student protests which escalated into a nationwide general strike which halted the French economy and continued with wildcat strikes after the Grenelle agreements granted higher wages, leading to fears of a revolution against Charles de Gaulle; ended with Gaullist counter-demonstrations and a vote of confidence from the National Assembly.
1971-72	Namibian contract workers general strike	Nationwide	Namibia	A general strike by workers under the contract labor system of what was then known as South West Africa (now Namibia) under the control of apartheid South Africa. The goal was to end the contract labor system due to slave like conditions and promote Namibian independence. It led to SWANLA being abolished & replaced with a less punitive but still repressive contract labor system. It also fueled the war for independence.
1972	Québec general strike of 1972	Québec	Canada	
1973	Uruguay general strike of 1973	Nationwide	Uruguay	Unsuccessful general strike against the 1973 Uruguayan coup d'état, leading the civic-military dictatorship to ban trade unions.
1974	Ulster Workers' Council strike	Northern Ireland	United Kingdom	Successful Ulster loyalist general strike against the Sunningdale Agreement between Great Britain and Ireland, which would have attempted to resolve the Northern Ireland conflict by establishing a power-sharing Northern Ireland Executive and revived Council of Ireland
1975	Icelandic women's strike of 1975	Nationwide	Iceland	
1976	Canadian general strike of 1976	Nationwide	Canada	
1976	24 March strike	Nationwide	People's Republic of the Congo	
1978	Iranian Revolution	Nationwide	Iran	
1979	1979 New Zealand general strike	Nationwide	New Zealand	The Federation of Labour holds a 24-hour general strike held to protest the Third National Government's intervention in the general drivers' award.
1984	Uruguayan general strikes of 1984	Nationwide	Uruguay	Successfully ended the Uruguayan dictatorships by forcing free elections to occur under the threat of continued rolling 24 hour general strikes if not allowed.
1988	Spanish general strike of 1988	Nationwide	Spain	Workers' Commissions and Unión General de Trabajadores strike against the Spanish Socialist Workers' Party's policies under Prime Minister Felipe González
1989	Velvet Revolution	Nationwide	Czechoslovakia	
1990	1990 Moroccan general strike	Nationwide	Morocco	
1992	April 1992 general strike in Nepal	Nationwide	Nepal	
1995	French general strikes of 1995	Nationwide	France	
1998	1998 Danish general strike	Copenhagen	Denmark	
1998	1998 Puerto Rican general strike	Nationwide	United States (Puerto Rico)	41-day general strike against the privatization of the Puerto Rico Telephone Company, accompanied by some violence and sabotage.
2000	Cochabamba Water War	Cochabamba	Bolivia	
2002–2003	Venezuelan general strike of 2002–2003	Nationwide	Venezuela	General strike against President Hugo Chávez including a large contingent of PDVSA workers.
2003	Bolivian gas conflict	Nationwide	Bolivia	
2006	Nepalese Revolution	Nationwide	Nepal	
2007	2007 Guinea general strike	Nationwide	Guinea	Successful general strike forcing President Lansana Conté to resign.
2007	2007 South African public servants' strike	Nationwide	South Africa	
2007	2007 Swazi general strike	Nationwide	Eswatini	
2008	2008 Egyptian general strike	Nationwide	Egypt	General strike including large contingent of textile workers during the 2007–2008 world food price crisis
2009	2009 French Caribbean general strikes	Guadeloupe	France	
2011	2011 Oakland general strike	Oakland, California	United States	Part of the Occupy Oakland demonstrations
2012	2012 European general strike	Cyprus, Malta, Portugal, Italy, Spain, France, Greece, Belgium	European Union	
2016	Indian general strike of 2016	Nationwide	India	24-hour general strike against Prime Minister Narendra Modi's economic policies
2017	2017 Brazilian general strike	Nationwide	Brazil	General strike against President Michel Temer's labor reform policies during the Brazilian economic crisis.
2017	2017 Catalan general strike	Catalonia	Spain	General strike in support of the Catalan independence movement, accompanied by police repression by the Spanish government.
2018	2018 Jordanian general strike	Nationwide	Jordan	Anti-austerity general strike
2018–2019	2018–2019 Iranian general strikes and protests	Nationwide	Iran	
2018–present	School strike for climate	Global	Various	International movement of students skipping classes to support renewable energy and climate change mitigation
2019	2019 Catalan general strike	Catalonia	Spain	
2019	2019 Hong Kong general strike	Nationwide	Hong Kong	
2019	2019 Indian General Strike	Nationwide	India	
2019	Sudanese Revolution	Nationwide	Sudan	
2020	2020–2021 Belarusian protests	Nationwide	Belarus	
2020	2020 United States essential workers general strike	Nationwide	United States	General strike involving essential workers during the COVID-19 pandemic
2020	Strike for Black Lives	Nationwide	United States	Mass walkout in support of the George Floyd protests
2020	2020 Indian general strike	Nationwide	India	Preceded the 2020–2021 Indian farmers' protest
2021	2021 Greek general strike	Nationwide	Greece	24-hour general strike against a bill in the Hellenic Parliament that would give employers more power in regards to their employees.
2021	2021 Myanmar strikes	Nationwide	Myanmar	
2021	Striketober	Nationwide	United States	
2022	2022 Iranian general strike	Nationwide	Iran	3 day general strike in response to protestors killed by Iranian security forces.
2022	2022 Kazakh unrest	Nationwide	Kazakhstan	
2024	2024 Nigerian general strike	Nationwide	Nigeria	General strike due to low minimum wage.
2025	2024–2025 Serbian anti-corruption protests	Nationwide	Serbia	General strike due to political corruption and the Novi Sad railway station canopy collapse
2025	2025 Portuguese general strike	Nationwide	Portugal	General strike against new labor package demanded by the Democratic Alliance government.
2026	2026 Minnesota general strike	Minnesota	United States	General strike against ICE operations and the Immigration policy of the second Trump administration
2026	2026 India general Strike	Nationwide	India	General strike against trade deals with the US and the EU as well as four new labor laws
2026	2026 Portuguese general strike	Nationwide	Portugal	Second general strike against proposed labour reform package.
2026	2026 Spanish general strike	Nationwide	Spain	Strike over housing crisis and in anticipation of the 2026 Spanish general election. In collaboration with tenant unions and other protestors, the Workers' Commissions (CCOO) and General Union of Workers (UGT) called for a general strike on 11 November.

== See also ==
- List of US labor strikes by size
- List of miners' strikes
- List of worker deaths in United States labor disputes
- Streetcar strikes in the United States
- Strikes during the COVID-19 pandemic
- Timeline of labor unions in the United States
- List of protests in the 21st century
