= 1937 timber worker strikes =

Labor action in Minnesota

1937 Timber Worker Strikes
- Striking timber workers in Michigan, organized by the Minnesotan Timber Worker's Union
- Date: January 1937, November 1937

Parties
| Industrial Workers of the World; Timber Worker's Union | Minnesota Timber Producers' Association | State of Minnesota |

Lead figures
| Fred LeQuier; Jim Rogers; Ilmar Koivunen; Martin Kuusisto | | Elmer Benson |

Number
| 4000 | | |

The 1937 Timber Worker Strikes were two successful strikes aimed at organizing and improving the conditions of timber workers in Northern Minnesota, and to help support similar efforts in Michigan.

== Background ==
Logging had been one of the largest industries in Minnesota since statehood. Attempts by workers to organize began almost immediately, in 1858, but attempts to strike or for unions were unsuccessful. The American Federation of Labor refused to work with Timber workers, after workers in Cloquet attempted to join the organization in 1896. The Industrial Workers of the World (IWW) did accept timber workers, but the IWW's attempts to unionize timber workers in 1916 and 1917 were violently suppressed. Logging conditions worsened in the 1930s.

== January Strike ==
Inspired by the Minneapolis general strike of 1934, and the election of pro-union governor Elmer Benson in November 1936, The loggers began a strike on January 4, 1937. Logging companies were caught off-guard, and needed to end the strike before the spring as to not lose their winter harvest. The workers' demands were eight-hour workdays, $70 per month wage, and better living conditions. By the end of January, these demands were met and the strike ended. An officially recognized Timber Worker's Union was also established.

== November Strike ==
The Timber Worker's Union would help organize strikers in Michigan, which soon turned violent. Duluth labor lawyer Henry Paull was severely beaten, and the Michigan strikes collapsed. Inspired by the defeat of strikers in Michigan, Minnesotan businesses created the Minnesota Timber Producers' Association (MTPA). When the one-year contract signed after the first strike ended, the MTPA refused to meet any worker demands, and launched a public relations campaign to drive a wedge between farmers and timber workers. As tensions began to rise, Governor Benson arrived in Duluth in November, conducting negotiations during standoffs blockading highways US 61 and MN 45 between picket lines and company trucks. On November 21, a deal was made, and the workers kept their January gains.

== See also ==
- 1907 Mesabi Range strike
- 1916 Mesabi Range strike
