= Virginia's Indentured Servants' Plot =

A sizable indentured servants' uprising occurred in Virginia in 1661 over the issue of adequate food. The customary ration for servants at the time included meat three times a week. When a planter named Major Goodwin decided to keep his servants on a diet of cornbread and water, discontent followed. Leaders of the servants named Isaac Friend and William Cluton determined to petition the king for redress.

According to one witness, the plot became more troublesome to the plantation owners when Isaac Friend stated, "they would get a matter of Forty of them together and get Gunnes, and he (Cluton) would be the first and lead them and cry as they went along 'who would be for liberty and freed from bondage?' and that there would enough come to them, and they would goe through the country and Kill those that made any opposition, and that they would either be free or die for it". (Punctuation editor's.)

The York county court settled the case by bounding William Cluton over for inciting servants to rebellion, but after several witnesses testified to his good character, the judges discharged him. Isaac Friend escaped punishment as well. The court admonished the masters and magistrates to keep a close watch on their servants. In 1662 a law was passed which restrained servants from "unlawful" meetings under heavy penalties.

== See also ==
- List of strikes
