= Chile truckers' strike =

1972 strike in Chile

The 1972 October strike, also known as the "bosses' strike" or the "truckers' strike", was an employers' strike carried out in Chile during the month of October 1972, against the Popular Unity government headed by the President Salvador Allende, due to the economic crisis in the country. This strike was supported and financed by Chilean business associations and the US Central Intelligence Agency (CIA), which sought to destabilize the socialist government, although the strike itself was a heterogeneous movement and was initially not led by the Chilean parties receiving covert CIA funding.

== Grassroots Response ==
In response to the October 1972 strike, grassroots organizations played a crucial role in maintaining daily life and countering economic disruption. Workers, students, and community members organized to ensure the continued distribution of essential goods and services. For instance, local activists established alternative food distribution and transportation networks, effectively mitigating the strike's impact. These efforts exemplified the concept of "popular power," where ordinary citizens took collective action to address immediate challenges and assert their agency in the political landscape. The Revolutionary Left Movement (MIR) supported these grassroots initiatives, emphasizing the importance of bottom-up political engagement. This period highlighted the significant influence of grassroots movements in Chile's political dynamics during the early 1970s.

== See also ==
- Presidency of Salvador Allende
- List of strikes
