= MinnTac =

American mining company

MinnTac also known as Minnesota Taconite, formerly known as the Oliver Iron Mining Company, was a mining company operating in Minnesota, United States. It was one of the most prominent companies in the early decades of mining on the Mesabi Range. As a division of U.S. Steel, Oliver dwarfed its competitors—in 1920, it operated 128 mines across the region, while its largest competitor operated only 65.

== History ==
In 1891, the Merritt brothers leased state-owned land in section 8, township 58 north, range 17 west in St. Louis County, Minnesota (now the Mountain Iron Mine). Their agent, John G. Cohoe, sank a test pit on the property in March 1892 and immediately struck a large iron ore deposit only a few feet beneath the surface. The Merritts, however, had discovered a large number of deposits and lacked the capital to exploit them all.

In March 1892, Henry W. Oliver, a Pittsburgh pig iron manufacturer, was in Minneapolis to oversee preparations for the 1892 Republican National Convention. He decided to make a side trip to the Mesabi Iron Range, which had been undergoing an enormous mining boom for the past two years. Oliver visited the Mountain Iron Mine site and was so impressed that he immediately leased it from the Merritts.

The terms of the lease, signed on August 1, 1892, required Oliver to pay a royalty of 65 cents a ton, and to min at least 200,000 short tons (180,000 t) a year, beginning in 1893. Additionally, Oliver was to immediately make an advance on the royalty payment of $75,000 (equivalent to $2,335,000 in 2024), pay a $5,000 signing bonus (equivalent to $156,000 in 2024), and to pay a royalty of no less than $45,000 a month (equivalent to $1,401,000 in 2024) in the first three months of 1893.

On September 30, 1892, Oliver incorporated the Oliver Mining Company with capital of $1.2 million (equivalent to $37,364,000 in 2024). The co-founding investors were H.R. Rea, G.E. Tener, E.D. Reis, C.D. Fraser, and Edward Florada.

Oliver mined 300,000 short tons (270,000 t) in 1893 and 400,000 short tons (360,000 t) in 1894.

Needing to identify customers for the very large amount of ore he was mining, Oliver approached Pittsburgh steel manufacturer Andrew Carnegie in late 1892 and offered him half the Oliver Mining Co. stock in exchange for a loan. Henry Clay Frick, manager of Carnegie's steel interests, advised Carnegie to accept, but Carnegie believed ore mining was a money loser. Oliver was in some financial difficulty by early 1894, and this time Frick approached Oliver with the same deal. Oliver accepted, and the deal consummated in March 1894. John D. Rockefeller's push into iron ore mining the previous year apparently convinced Carnegie to make the deal.

In 1896, Carnegie increased his ownership stake in Oliver Mining Co. to 83.3 percent.

Since Carnegie owned steel mills but Rockefeller didn't, Rockefeller had virtually no other options than to sell his ore to Carnegie. As a result, the three men reached a compromise in 1896: Oliver would mine the ore, Rockefeller's railroad system would transport the product, and Carnegie would transform it into steel. This agreement was finalized in 1901, and U.S. Steel (USS) was incorporated as the largest corporation in the world.

Oliver mines were originally clustered on the eastern end of the Mesabi. In 1900, however, investors Chester Adgate Congdon and Guilford G. Hartley acquired mineral leases on the western end of the Range near the town of Nashwauk. The ore in this area was sandier than the ore mined on the eastern end, so it needed processing in order to be used in a steel mill. This processing is called concentration because ore is concentrated into a higher-grade product. Because of the high costs associated with processing, the businessmen approached Oliver Iron Mining Company with an investment opportunity. In 1904, Oliver invested $10 million in a concentration plant that would serve this area, which the corporation referred to as the "Canisteo District". The plant, called the Trout Lake Concentrator, transformed the region, helping existing towns like Bovey and Calumet grow. In addition, the towns of Coleraine, Marble, and Taconite were directly built by Oliver to house workers in the newly developing region.

In 1907, miners organized themselves into labor unions because they felt that mining companies—including Oliver—weren't treating them fairly. A majority did not speak English and were therefore vulnerable to exploitation. When Oliver didn't respond to a list of union demands presented that July, nearly 16,000 miners launched the 1907 Mesabi Range strike. To continue operations, Oliver brought in new workers directly from Europe. When production recovered as a result, the strike collapsed and many miners returned to work—although some were blacklisted by the mining companies and never worked in a mine again. Nine years later miners protested once again with the 1916 Mesabi Range strike. This time, Oliver hired armed guards, and in June, a dispute between strikers and guards broke out in Virginia, Minnesota. A picketer, John Alar, was killed and subsequently became a martyr for the cause. As the strike continued into late July, Elizabeth Gurley Flynn—a well-known American labor organizer—spoke to strikers and encouraged them to persevere, but many soon returned to work in August, effectively ending the strike.

As natural ore reserves diminished due to increased production for the World War I effort, Oliver turned to ore that required more processing than the rich ore that he originally purchased from the Merritt brothers. While the Trout Lake Concentrator was still in operation in the Canisteo District, Oliver built the Pilotac and Extaca plants near the city of Virginia. Pilotac was built to research methods for concentrating taconite ore, and Extaca was built to agglomerate, or combine, taconite concentrate into a high-iron product that could be used in steel mills. Millions of dollars were invested in taconite plants throughout the Iron Range, and taconite became the chief rock mined in the region. As the Iron Range transitioned to taconite mining, United States Steel dropped the Oliver name in place of Minnesota Ore Operations.

The company would eventually be renamed to Minnesota Taconite, and then nicknamed MinnTac. In 1999, U.S. Steel would shut down MinnTac's railroad operations, as the company was turning towards trucking for their shipping needs, with the last train operating on November 29, 1999, leading to all locomotives and rolling stock being sold off. Most of the SW1500 fleet were sold off, and eleven of the MP15DC fleet were sold in 1999, while two of them 968 and 971 would remain on the roster for switching purposes.

== Locomotive fleet ==
Number	Model	Builder	Build date	Notes
949-954	SW1500	EMD	September 1972	
955-965	MP15DC	EMD	May 1976	
966-971	MP15DC	EMD	August 1976	

== Bibliography ==
- Harvey, George (1928). Henry Clay Frick: The Man. New York: Charles Scribner's Sons. OCLC 1310277654.
- Van Brunt, Walter (1921). Duluth and St. Louis County, Minnesota: Their Story and People. Chicago: American Historical Society. OCLC 7368864.
