= 2019 Indian general strike =

2019 Indian General Strike
- Part of Anti-austerity movement
- Date: January 8th and 9th, 2019
- Location: Europe, Spain, Italy, France, Portugal, Greece, Belgium, Malta, Cyprus
- Caused by: Stop the Modi government's anti-union legislation
- Goals: a minimum wage, limitations on contract work and minimum workers' rights.
- Methods: Strike action, including flying pickets Civil disobedience

On January 8 and 9, 2019, one of the largest general strikes in workers' history took place in India with almost 200 million striking people. Ten Indian union federations had called for the nationwide strike.

The call for strikes led to strong participation, both in the various sectors of the public service and in privately organized industry and the informal sector. The trade union federations had agreed on a catalog of 12 demands and wanted, among other things, to prevent anti-union legislation from the Modi government that was about to be passed. The strikers also demanded a minimum wage and pension for people in India, and a 12-month limit on contract work. The governments of various Indian states, e.g. from West Bengal and Tamil Nadu threatened the strikers with countermeasures. The following 2020 Indian general strike that was held across India on 26 November 2020 was even larger.

The trade union federations INTUC, AITUC, Hind Mazdoor Sabha (HMS), CITU, All India United Trade Union Centre (AIUTUC), TUCC, Self Employed Women's Association (SEWA), AICCTU, Labour Progressive Federation (LPF) and UTUC had called for the strike. Only the RSS union, which belongs to the right-wing Hindu Rashtriya Swayamsevak Sangh, did not take part.

== See also ==
- List of strikes
