= 2016 Indian general strike =

On 2 September 2016, an estimated 150 million to 180 million Indian public sector workers went on a 24-hour nationwide general strike against Prime Minister Narendra Modi's plans for increasing privatization and other economic policies. A total of ten trade unions participated. Many government-run locations and transportation services were closed. The strikers also protested in favour of social security, universal healthcare, and an increased minimum wage. The strike mainly took place in states where opposition parties were the most influential, such as Karnataka and Kerala. It was the largest strike in human history, until the 2020 Indian general strike.

== See also ==
- List of strikes
