= List of strikes in Denmark =

The following is a list of strikes in Denmark. Throughout Danish history, a number of strikes, labour disputes, student protests, hunger strikes, and other industrial actions have occurred.

== Background ==
A labour strike is a work stoppage caused by the mass refusal of employees to work. This can include wildcat strikes, which are done without union authorisation, and slowdown strikes, where workers reduce their productivity while still carrying out minimal working duties. It is usually a response to employee grievances, such as low pay or poor working conditions. Strikes can also occur to demonstrate solidarity with workers in other workplaces or pressure governments to change policies.

== 20th century ==
=== 1920s ===
- Easter Crisis, including strikes, for electoral reform.

=== 1940s ===
- Augustoprøret, da, including a general strike in Odense in August 1943, against Nazi occupation, part of the Danish resistance movement.
- Folkestrejken, da, general strike in summer 1944 against Nazi occupation, part of the Danish resistance movement.

=== 1950s ===
- 1953 Danish conscripts' strike, strikes by military conscripts against extension of the length of conscription.
- 1956 Danish general strike

=== 1960s ===
- 1965 Danish beer strike

=== 1970s ===
- 1977 Danish printers' strike

=== 1980s ===
- 1981 Danish printers' strike, 11-week strike in the printing industry in Denmark.
- Påskestrejkerne 1985, general strikes in Denmark.

=== 1990s ===
- 1995 Danish nurses' strike, 3-week strike by nurses.
- 1998 Danish general strike

== 21st century ==
=== 2000s ===
- 2008 Danish public sector strike, 2-month strike by public sector workers.

=== 2010s ===
- 2010 Carlsberg strike, strike by Carlsberg Group brewery workers over a new policy that limited the free beer the workers had access to.
- 2017 Denmark women's national football team strike, after the Danish Football Association attempting to stop classifying women's national team players as employees.

=== 2020s ===
- 2021 Danish nurses strike
