= 2023 German public transport strike =

Labor dispute in Germany

2023 Germany Strike
- Date: 27 March 2023
- Location: Germany
- Goals: Demand for a 10.5% pay increase for transport workers to offset rising energy and food costs
- Methods: Labor strike
- Status: Ended after 24 hours, negotiations resumed between unions and employers
- Concessions: Some increased pay for workers in April 2023

Parties
Ver.di; EVG	Employers

Number
Over 400,000 transport workers	

The 2023 German public transport strike was a nationwide labor strike that occurred in March 2023 in Germany. The strike was organized by Ver.di and EVG, two major transport unions, who demanded a 10.5% pay increase for their members to offset rising food and energy costs. This strike was one of the largest to affect Germany in decades and impacted airports - including those in Munich, Frankfurt, and Hamburg - public transport, and the country's largest seaport. Railroad services, as well as early morning regional and commuter rail services, were suspended throughout the country.

The strike disrupted travel for millions, halting operations at airports, bus terminals, and train stations nationwide. Ver.di represented around 2.5 million public sector employees, including those in public transport and at airports, while EVG negotiated on behalf of about 230,000 workers at Deutsche Bahn and bus companies. Deutsche Bahn cancelled train services, and Germany’s airport association estimated that flight suspensions impacted approximately 380,000 passengers at major airports such as Munich and Frankfurt.

The strike involved over 400,000 transport workers, making it the largest transport workers' action since a series of strikes in the 1990s. Its aim was to serve as a warning to the government and employers about the potential consequences of failing to negotiate salary increases that would keep pace with inflation. A YouGov poll revealed that around 55% of Germans considered the strike to be justified. Although Karin Welge, a spokesperson for VKA, a group that represents public sector employers, called the strike an "unprovoked escalation," the unions argued that it was necessary to make it clear to employers that employees support their demands. The strike was mostly peaceful, but it caused significant disruption to travel and commerce in Germany, which is Europe's largest economy. After 24 hours, the strike ended, and negotiations between the unions and employers resumed.

The action was part of a broader wave of public sector unrest in Germany during early 2023, with smaller walkouts by childcare, education, and postal workers preceding the transport strike. The BBC reported that the March stoppage was dubbed a "mega strike" in local media due to its scale and disruption.

== Impact ==
In April 2023, government authorities agreed to increase pay for Germany's 2.5 million public sector workers, averting additional strikes.
