= 2007 South African public servants' strike =

The 2007 South African public servants' strike was a general strike of workers in the public sector of South Africa. It was led by the Congress of South African Trade Unions (COSATU), which is currently in a labour/political alliance with the governing African National Congress (ANC) party of Thabo Mbeki (since succeeded by Jacob Zuma).

== Dispute ==
The strike arose out of demands by South Africa's trade unions to raise the pay for civil servants by no less than 12%. The government offered a 7.25% pay raise, which the trade unions refused to accept.

== See also ==
- 2007 in South Africa
