= French general strike of 1936 =

Strike which led to the creation of unions

The French general strike of 1936 aimed to establish workers' rights, which began on 11 May 1936 in the Bréguet factory and led to the creation of unions. The strike began to end with the Parisian metal unions returning to work on 12 June 1936.

The strike resulted in the improvement of workers' rights in France, such as the 40-hour week and the legal acceptance of unions, stopping employers from discriminating against those in unions.

== Background ==
During the 1920s and early 1930s, people were not willing to associate themselves as trade union activists due to dismissal being the common recourse. Herrick Chapman estimates that although in general aircraft factories had between 150 and 1,500 workers, there were rarely more than "a half dozen men in the early thirties who devoted themselves to the clandestine life of communist cell meetings, tract writing, and the virtually futile effort to recruit comrades". Between 1927 and 1933, there were 10 aircraft workers' strikes, of which 8 failed.

In 1931, the great depression hit France. The great depression caused factories to close and sharpened the societal conflict in France. The effects of this depression began to be felt in 1934, when there were violent right-wing protests which some authors such as Michael Torigian believe "threatened the existence of the French Republic".

Adolf Hitler's rearmament caused the French government to launch Plan I in 1934, which was a major procurement program based on equipping the air force. This meant that by 1935, the workforce in aircraft construction had hit 32,000 workers, which was double the number it was in 1933.

On 6 June,1936, a Popular Front government was elected, so the workers expected socialist policies and ideas from the government which would push their interests, such as workers' rights. Although a socialist government had been elected, it didn't mean that the government could push through economic changes to the markets, etc. too quickly. Furthermore, the strike movement destabilised the Popular Front government led by Léon Blum.

== The strike ==
After the first election of a socialist Prime Minister, there were strikes across the economy which began in May 1936, and carried on until June 1936. Those who were on strike adopted a tactic of "occupying" their places of work; for some, this brought hope, and for others it brought fear of a revolution. Those on strike locked their employers out of the buildings whilst locking themselves in.

The strikes began in Le Havre and Toulouse in aircraft factories and quickly gained traction in many other cities, with the plethora of industries involved widening. The strikes began on 11 May 1936 in the Bréguet factory due to two men being sacked. This strike was organised by the CGT (General Confederation of Labour, which was communist led).

The strikes began to spread across France quickly; by 1 June 1936, there were 10 occupied workplaces, and by the evening of 2 June, there were 150 occupied workplaces. Half of the metallio workers (metal workers) were on strike, which equated to about 150,000 people on strike. This part of the movement was not sanctioned by the CGT leadership and had spread with people using these strikes as a means to end the deep-rooted grievances. By June 5, over half a million workers were on strike; from the beginning of his premiership, Blum resisted calls from the right to end the strikes through force. On the evening of June 7, the CGT, employer representatives and the government drew up the Matignon agreements.

Even with the agreements, the number of those on strike still increased, and by the 9th of June there were 2 million workers, which, according to Michael Torigian, accounted for around a quarter of the French working class population.

The strikes had become out of control, with the CGT metal union being unable to end the strikes. This led to the party chief, who was Maurice Thorez, going to the communists to ask for them to help to end the strikes on the 11th. The French metal workers consisted of around 300,000 people.

By the 12th, the strikes were beginning to end, with the settlement in the metal works being dealt with.

== Result ==
The Matignon agreements were the agreements signed on June 7, which led to the June 24 laws. These laws had some major features, such as the French government allowing the creation of unions in 1936 as a result of the strikes; this helped those in unions in the hiring process, as employers were not allowed to discriminate against those in unions. Furthermore, the agreement legislated mandatory joint conflict resolution with members from the unions as well as within the employer in a collective agreement. On July 21, the 40-hour week was voted in by the Popular Front government. The strikes also led to higher wages and two weeks of paid holidays.

The two workers who were fired in the Bréguet factory were reinstated.
