= 2021–2023 Warrior Met Coal strike =

Labor dispute in Alabama, United States

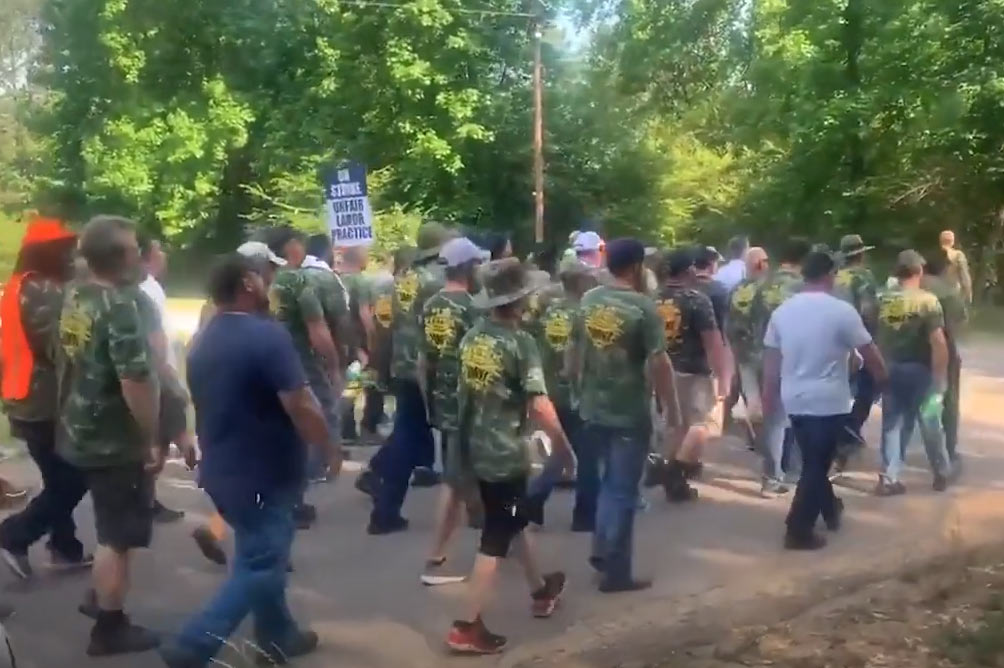
- Striking workers protesting Warrior Met
- Date: April 1, 2021 – March 2, 2023
- Location: Alabama, United States
- Goals: Increased wages; Improved scheduling; Additional time off
- Methods: Strike action

Parties
United Mine Workers District 20	Warrior Met Coal Inc.

The 2021–2023 Warrior Met Coal strike was a labor strike in Alabama, United States. The strike began on April 1, 2021 and involved members of the United Mine Workers of America striking against Warrior Met Coal Inc. Warrior Met was formed after the bankruptcy of Walter Energy and operates coal mining facilities in the state. The strike was over the failure of the union and company to agree to a labor contract for the approximately 1,100 union members who work for Warrior Met.

== Background ==
Warrior Met Coal Inc. is a coal mining company that operates several mines in Alabama, including near Brookwood and Bessemer. Warrior Met was formed to buy the assets of Walter Energy after that company declared bankruptcy in 2015, and in the aftermath, many of the workers lost job benefits and labor contracts they had had with Walter. In 2019, the company reported a net income of $302 million (~$364 million in 2024). However, the following year, due to the COVID-19 pandemic, the company reported a $35 million loss. Of the 1,400 workers at Warrior Met, approximately 1,100 are members of the United Mine Workers of America (UMWA) District 20. On April 1, 2021, the labor contract between the UMWA and Warrior Met was set to expire, and in the weeks leading up to this, both sides entered into negotiations over the terms of the next contract. However, these negotiations proved fruitless, as neither side could agree to the terms of a contract. According to a later report, the union was seeking higher wages, better scheduling, and additional time off for their members. Discussing Warrior Met, a union representative claimed that the company had a poor labor-management relationship and accused the company of generating millions in profit and giving management over $35,000 in bonuses while not agreeing to fair terms on a contract. In response, the company stated that they were offering competitive benefits for the workers. They also stated that they had been bargaining in good faith with the union. On March 31, the UMWA issued a strike notice for strike action starting the next day. Additionally, the union filed unfair labor practice charges with the National Labor Relations Board over the company's conduct during negotiations.

== Course of the strike ==
The strike began at 10 p.m. on April 1, with strikers picketing outside Warrior Met facilities. During the course of the strike, dues-paying union members who participate in strike activities will receive a bi-weekly strike pay, and the union was seeking to provide health care coverage during the strike. The families of strikers saw an immediate loss of company health care coverage due to the strike action. On April 5, it was announced that a tentative agreement between the union and company had been reached that could end the strike, with a vote scheduled for April 9. On April 7, meetings were held to explain the provisions of the agreement to the union members. While details were not made publicly available, one union member stated that the company was offering a $1.50 hourly raise, with $1 immediately and $0.50 after 3 years. On April 9, members voted to reject the proposal and continue the strike, with UMWA president Cecil Roberts stating that the company's offer was "not sufficient" for the strikers.

On May 7, Gizmodo reported that two creeks in Alabama were flowing with an abundance of wastewater runoff from the mines. Union representatives did not draw a direct connection between the strike and the runoff, but one did say "when the normal workforce is working in that mind [sic] you don’t see these sorts of things happening. ... These things don’t happen so much when the UMWA workforce is in these mines." On May 14, between 30 and 40 strikers held a sit-in outside of the company's headquarters in Brookwood, blocking traffic entering and exiting the parking lot before police arrived. At this point in the strike, the union was holding weekly rallies on Wednesdays at the Tannehill State Park. On May 22, the Alabama Strike Fest, a benefit concert aimed at helping the strikers, was held at the union hall and featured performances by Mike Cooley of the band Drive-By Truckers and several union members. On May 25, 11 strikers were arrested for trespassing during a protest at a Warrior Met mine in Tuscaloosa County.

On June 7, the UMWA released a statement sharing that three incidents of "vehicular assault" had occurred on their picket lines. UMWA President, Cecil Roberts called on Warrior Met "to back away from violence and finally come to the bargaining table in good faith". He continued, saying that "if Warrior Met decides to continue inspiring violence on the picket lines, their leadership should understand that UMWA members have been subjected to company violence for 131 years and will not be deterred from seeking a fair contract for them and their families."

On June 22, striking Warrior Met employees protested outside of the New York City offices of the three hedge funds that own shares in Warrior Met, BlackRock (13%), State Street Global Advisors (11%), and Renaissance Technologies (4%). The group protested at BlackRock's offices first in the morning and then split into two groups to protest at SSGA and Renaissance Technologies' offices in the afternoon. Their afternoon protests were cut short because of rainy weather.

Another protest in New York City took place on the 28th of July, also outside BlackRock offices, and involved over 100 people. Protesters were seen carrying signs that read "we are one", chanting in unison and speaking out against their treatment by the coal company.

On February 16, 2023, 23 months after the strike began, UMWA president Cecil Roberts sent a letter to Warrior Met Coal CEO Walt Scheller offering an unconditional return to work on March 2. Scheller responded the next day, accepting the return of the miners under their original contract, except for 41 that Warrior Met claims engaged in misconduct related to the strike. The total cost to the union for strike pay and other expenses was over $35 million, while the cost to the company is estimated at over $1 billion.

== See also ==
- COVID-19 pandemic in Alabama
- Strikes during the COVID-19 pandemic
