= 1998 Danish general strike =

Labour action in Denmark

The 1998 Danish general strike was a general strike in Denmark in the spring of 1998 involving around 500 000 workers, around 10% of the Danish population.

== Background ==
In early 1998, members of the Danish Confederation of Trade Unions (LO) agreed on a "three sixes" programme, aiming to secure six weeks of paid vacation each year, a six-hour working day, and a 6% pay raise.

== Strike ==
In April 1998, the LO and the Dansk Arbejdsgiverforening announced a new two-year collective bargaining agreement that included only a single extra day of paid vacation per year. When the LO put the agreement to a vote of its members, 55% of the workers voted against it. Subsequently, on the 27th of April, the workers walked out on strike.

On 6 May, Danish Prime Minister and leader of the Social Democrats Poul Nyrup Rasmussen stated that the strike was "irresponsible" and announced measures to end the strike. The measures ordered workers to end the strike by the 11th of May, made it illegal for the same workers to go on strike again within the next two years, and reduced the amount companies had to pay towards employee pensions. The measures also included two extra paid vacations days for workers who had worked for at least nine months at their workplace as well as two additional days of discounted childcare to workers who had spent at least six months at their workplace. The unions accepted the measures without a members' vote, and the strike came to an end. Since then, membership numbers in Danish unions have been steadily declining.

== Assessement ==
Margaret Slusher of Swarthmore College's Global Nonviolent Action Database assessed the gains won by the workers as "very small." Sam Lowry of libcom.org stated that the strike "left workers demands largely unmet."

The European Foundation for the Improvement of Living and Working Conditions described the strike as "the key event in Danish industrial relations in 1998," attributing the strike to the Dansk Arbejdsgiverforening beginning to break away from the traditional Danish cycle of collective bargaining, motivated by a fear of increased economic competition in a growing economy, whereas the workers expected higher increase in wages and benefits from the economic growth. Some commentators believed the government had acted to try and ensure a "Yes" victory in the upcoming 1998 Danish Amsterdam Treaty referendum.

== Aftermath ==
The acceptance of the government's measures to end the strike led to an increase in discontent with trade unions in Denmark. The end of the strike also saw a drop in union members contributions to the Social Democrats.

== See also ==
- List of strikes in Denmark
