= 1998 Russian miners' strike =

1998 strike in Russia

- Part of the 1998 Russian financial crisis and the 1997–1998 Russian protests
- Date: May – July 1998
- Location: Komi Republic, Kemerovo and Rostov Oblasts, Russia
- Goals: Payment of wages
- Methods: Strikes, nonviolent resistance, civil disobedience
- Concessions: Wages paid

Parties
Trade unions Sympathetic citizens	Government of Russia; Employers

Lead figures
Decentralised leadership	Boris Yeltsin (President of Russia); Sergey Kiriyenko (Prime Minister of Russia); Nikolai Aksyonenko (Minister of Railways)

The 1998 Russian miners' strike, also known as the "rail war", was a strike of Russian coal miners over the non-payment of wages after a year. In addition to the demands for wages, strikers demanded the resignation of Boris Yeltsin as President of Russia. The strikes eventually ended with the payment of wages by the mining companies involved.

== Beginning of strikes ==
Prior to the strikes, miners in Russia had called out the non-payment of wages. However, there was no response from the government of Russia. A multiple-month strike in Moscow was completely ignored by pro-government media, such as Public Russian Television.

Russian coal miners began to go on strike in May 1998, when miners in the town of Vorkuta walked out after being denied their wages for seven months. One miner said, "There is no money for the essentials. [...] We have to ask for money from retired parents, whom we ourselves must help. And they know what their pension is. I'm ashamed. [...] My son is asking me, 'Dad, are we going to die?' [...] In one family, a schoolboy hanged himself, and left a note that said, 'I'm tired of listening to [my father's] quarrels with my mother over money.' In another family, the father himself could not stand it - he blew himself up. Three of us have committed suicide. We are slaves and cattle. We slave away, and the bosses eat. We cannot live like this anymore!"

== Large-scale strikes ==
In May 1998, protesters blocked several key highways for two to three weeks. In the town of Inta, in the Komi Republic, strikers blocked traffic. Coal miners in the Kuznetsk Basin (Kuzbass) towns of Anzhero-Sudzhensk and Mezhdurechensk, as well as machinists in Yurga, blocked highways and railways which connected Siberia and the Russian Far East, cutting off Tomsk Oblast and the main route of the Trans-Siberian Railway. In Shakhty, a road connecting Southern Russia to Moscow was blocked by strikers.

Strikers in the Kuzbass only allowed trains of local origin, strategic importance, or those providing aid to miners. The transportation of cargo and passengers to and from the Russian Far East was, as a result, completely halted. On 20 May 1998, a state of emergency was declared in Kemerovo Oblast. At first, trains sought to avoid strikes by going through Barnaul, before this route, too, was blocked off by strikes.

In late May, a commission headed by Deputy Prime Minister Oleg Sysuyev arrived in the Kuzbass. After the visit, wages began to be paid from the federal budget. The government promised to pay off the debts of employees and pensioners of Kemerovo Oblast by 1 July. On 23 May, strikers cleared the roads in Mezhdurechensk, and traffic continued in the southern Kuzbass. On 24 May, the main route of the Trans-Siberian Railway was once again operable after blockages in Yurga and Anzhero-Sudzhensk dispersed.

By 1 June, however, the government had failed to fulfil its promises, and strikes, as well as blockages of important routes, resumed. On 19 July, Sysuyev returned to the Kuzbass, this time bringing 730 million Russian rubles with him. That day, the blockage of lines in the Kuzbass ceased for the final time, and strikers returned to work.

A 1998 report by the Moscow Helsinki Group on the strikes stated, "Indignation at the illegal delays in wages and the inability to tolerate the brazen continuation of non-payments have brought popular opinion in the coal regions to such a fury that people, striving for legitimate goals and values recognised by society, are ready to achieve them by illegal and destructive means."
