= Strike for Black Lives (coalition protest) =

2020 protests in the United States

- Part of George Floyd protests, Black Lives Matter, and Fight for $15
- Date: July 20, 2020
- Location: United States
- Methods: Walkout

The Strike for Black Lives was a mass walkout that occurred throughout the United States on July 20, 2020. Occurring during the George Floyd protests, the main goals of the strike were to draw attention to systemic racism and racial inequality in the United States, with additional goals including a raising of the minimum wage in the United States, stronger protections for unionizing, and expanded healthcare.

== Background ==
Following the murder of George Floyd by Minneapolis police officer Derek Chauvin on May 25, 2020, a series of protests occurred, initially in the Twin Cities area, but quickly spreading across the United States and worldwide. As part of the wider Black Lives Matter movement, the protests are rooted in longstanding racial issues in the United States, such as police brutality, institutionalized racism, and racial discrimination. The idea for a mass strike was announced on Twitter on July 8 with the hashtag #StrikeForBlackLives. Over 60 groups helped to organize the event and included such groups as the International Brotherhood of Teamsters, the American Federation of Teachers, and the United Farm Workers. The Movement for Black Lives, a coalition of 150 independent Black Lives Matter groups, was also involved in the organization of the strike. President Mary Kay Henry of the Service Employees International Union (which was involved in the strike) stated that the strike was an effort to unite essential workers in the fight for both racial and economic justice. The Associated Press compared the strike to the Memphis sanitation strike, which was also caused by both racial and economic issues. According to organizers, the four main points of the strike were:

"Justice for Black communities, that elected officials use their authority to rewrite the rules so that Black people can thrive, that corporations dismantle racism, white supremacy and economic exploitation including at work and that every worker has the opportunity to join a union."

The strike took place during the COVID-19 pandemic, with African Americans making up a disproportionate percentage of workers impacted by the pandemic and constituting approximately 1 in 4 deaths due to COVID-19.

== Course of the strike ==
On July 20, the strike took place in 160 American cities at multiple places of employment. Workers from McDonald's and Walmart locations represented a significant portion of the strikers involved. At noon, many strikers kneeled or took a moment of silence for eight minutes 46 seconds in memory of Floyd. In Ferguson, Missouri, protesters marched to a memorial for Michael Brown, who was killed by police in 2014. In New York City, Senate Minority Leader Chuck Schumer spoke to a crowd of protesters outside of Trump International Hotel and Tower. Protesters there called for the Senate to pass the HEROES Act. In Chicago, protesters met at the James R. Thompson Center and marched to a nearby McDonald's. In Detroit, a mass work stoppage occurred at several nursing homes in the area, and a Fight for $15 protest was held at the same time as the strike. Protesters in Durham, North Carolina, painted a "BLACK LIVES MATTER" street mural at an intersection in downtown. Multiple politicians from the Democratic Party expressed support for the strike, including Senators Kamala Harris, Bernie Sanders, and Elizabeth Warren.

== See also ==
- Strikes during the COVID-19 pandemic
