= Anzin miners' strike =

Strike of the coalminers of Anzin, France, 1833

The Anzin miners' strike (French: Grève des mineurs d'Anzin), sometimes known as the great strike of the Anzin miners (French: Grande grève des mineurs d'Anzin), was a long strike of the miners of the mining company of Anzin ("Compagnie des mines d'Anzin") in 1884 which resulted in the recognition of the unions' right to strike under the so-called Waldeck-Rousseau law of the same year. It brought together more than 10,000 strikers for 56 days and as covered by the press had a national impact. Émile Zola was inspired by it to write Germinal.

== Context ==
The Restoration created an economic history favourable to the development of industries in the north, among other things through its protectionism. The Compagnie des mines d'Anzin grew into a large corporation, with influential political figures on its board of directors. In 1833, the miners of the company began a strike known as the "Riot of four cents", the demand being the cancellation of a wage cut of this amount decided on by the company. At the end of four days of strike and occupation of the siege, the mining company called in 3,000 soldiers. The miners returned to work without having obtained anything. The leaders were tried for conspiracy, and some were condemned to light sentences, but newspapers echoing the trial revealed the miners' conditions and the company finally gave in on the pay issue.

With the discovery of the continuation of the coal deposit in the Pas-de-Calais in 1841, the Compagnie des mines d'Anzin, which until then had been in a quasi-monopoly situation, was subjected to stronger competition, faced with more modern companies. Its employees were badly affected by the new constraints of profitability, and it experienced several strikes in the second half of the 19th century, which affected the city of Anzin where it remained the main employer, and where the settlements were occupied by troops several times.

In 1882, the Union Générale crash, caused by stock market speculation within Catholic circles, left mining companies in difficulty for several years. In 1883, Émile Basly founded the first miners’ union in Anzin.

== Direct causes ==
The Anzin miners’ strike broke out in February 1884. The cause of this strike was an organisational change: the timbering of the tunnels, which had previously been entrusted to the tunnel repairmen, was assigned to the underground miners themselves. Not only did this result in a loss of earnings for them, as they were paid according to the quantity of coal brought to the surface, but it also deprived the older miners of their jobs, as they had traditionally been assigned the role of tunnel repairmen.

== Course of events ==
From the very start of the strike, the dismissal of 140 trade unionists intensified the conflict. The strike involved more than 10,000 strikers over a period of 56 days. Widely reported in the press, it attracted national attention. This strike is described as ‘relatively calm’ by the historian Diana Cooper-Richet, despite the bombing of the homes of strike-breakers and three days of rioting from 4 to 6 April (in 1872, striking miners had fired on the army sent against them). The company sacked 2,000 miners at the end of the strike. However, the mining company did not give in, and on 17 April the miners returned to work.

== Aftermath ==
It was on this occasion that Émile Zola came to Anzin to gather material for his novel Germinal.

One consequence of this strike was the legalisation of trade unions under the Waldeck-Rousseau law; yet, paradoxically, it was not until 1898 that a trade union was re-established in Anzin.
