= Istanbul metalworkers' strike of 2008–2009 =

The Istanbul metalworkers strike of 2008–2009 was a strike by metalworkers at a sintering plant in Istanbul, Turkey. A dispute arose between workers, represented by Birlesik-Metal (the metalworkers' union), and Sinter Metal Technologies (SMT), the company which owns the plant, in December 2008 when plans for extensive job cuts were announced.

== Background ==
The SMT plant is located in Ümraniye, a working class district of Istanbul. Workers at the plant have described poor working conditions, long hours, and low wages. On 19 December 2008, management at the plant announced the loss of 37 jobs. On 22 December 2008, management announced plans for the loss of a further 400 jobs and locked the workers out of the plant.

== Strike ==
The workers responded to the initial lay-offs by joining the union, Birlesik-Metal, and staging a protest outside the plant. On 22 December 2008, workers responded to the lockout by climbing the gate and occupying the plant for two days. Since that time the workers have been picketing the plant to protest against the job losses.

== See also ==
- Trade unions in Turkey
