= 1945–1946 Yale and Towne strike =

Labor strike in Stamford, Connecticut, in 1945–1946

- Date: November 7, 1945 – April 5, 1946
- Location: Stamford, Connecticut
- Methods: Strikes (including a general strike), protest, demonstrations
- Result: Workers won a 12.5% pay increase and a closed shop agreement

Parties
International Association of Machinists	Yale & Towne

The 1945–1946 Yale and Towne strike was a work stoppage that occurred at lock manufacturer Yale & Towne's factory in Stamford, Connecticut. The strike occurred after contract negotiations broke down in the fall of 1945, when Yale & Towne sought for the factory to become an open shop, and declined to provide a wage increase. Workers affiliated with the International Association of Machinists initially staged a wildcat strike, which then progressed into a formal strike action endorsed by the union.

The strike went on for approximately two months, and increased in violence after Connecticut governor Raymond E. Baldwin sent in the state police to violently attack the striking workers after local police forces in Stamford declined Yale & Towne's request to break up the workers' picket line. This catalyzed public support for the strikers, and on January 3, 1946, approximately 10,000 people in Stamford partook in a single-day general strike, which shut down much of the city's businesses and services. This action earned significant national attention, and spurred the resumption of negotiations. Shortly after the AFL and CIO weighed another such action, Yale & Towne and the union reached an agreement on April 5, 1946, with the help of federal and state officials, which ensured the future existence of the union at the factory, wage increases, and union security.

== Background ==
A 2007 view of the Yale and Towne factory, shortly before it was converted to apartments

By the end of World War II, manufacturing accounted for a majority of employment in Stamford. The largest employer in this sector was Yale & Towne, a lock manufacturer which employed more than 3,000 of the city's 65,000 residents. During the war, the company's production shifted towards the war effort, and the company reluctantly recognized a workers' union affiliated with the International Association of Machinists.

=== Lead-up to the strike ===
On March 21, 1945, the company's contract with the union expired, and months of tense negotiations followed. Major points of contention during the negotiations included the company's demands for an open shop and no wage increase. When Yale & Towne fired the union's chief steward on September 21, about 3,000 workers, representing 80% of the factory's total, walked off the job that afternoon in a wildcat strike. On September 25, the wildcat strike ended, workers returned to work, and negotiations resumed.

== Course of the strike ==
Yale & Towne would respond by declaring the wildcat strike had terminated its contract with the union, and the company union in turn then officially declared a strike on November 7, 1945. In its formal declaration, the International Association of Machinists (IAM) demanded a 30% wage increase, and the enforcement of a closed shop. In the first weeks of the strike, the union picketed outside of the plant, at one point preventing the company president, W. Gibson Carey, from entering the plant. The picket sometimes turned physical, and police forces in Stamford declined Yale & Towne's request to forcefully break up the picket line. The company then appealed to the state's Republican governor Raymond E. Baldwin to send in the state police to break up the strike, which he did. The state police's violent break up of the strike picket in late December 1945 led to the union to call for a day of action on January 3, 1946. Governor Baldwin and Yale & Towne held a conference on December 31, 1945 to suggest the resumption of negotiations, which a union attorney said he had accepted, although he also noted that the possibility of a settlement would be "remote" and reiterated that "we will not sign an open shop agreement".

=== Escalation to a general strike ===
After a meeting on the morning of January 2, 1946, the Executive Committee of the Combined Stamford Labor Organizations declared that it would host a general strike at Atlantic Square at noon the following day, January 3. The declaration said that approximately 10,000 people would report to work the following morning, and then walk out and march onto Stamford's Town Hall, and not return to work for the rest of the day. The declaration said the scope of the strike would include workers in transportation, communications, utilities, theaters, and certain stores. The Combined Stamford Labor Organizations announced that several other unions would organize solidarity strikes: IAM locals in New York City were to picket the Chrysler Building, which hosted Yale & Towne's executive offices, while workers at Condé Nast in Greenwich, Norwalk Lock in Norwalk, Russell, Birdsall and Ward in Port Chester, and Homelite in Port Chester would all partake. The Combined Stamford Labor Organizations noted in its declaration that a more detailed plan would be submitted to the Stamford Police Department to discuss the possibility of enabling the continuation of transportation, power, light, and traffic flow during the strike.

=== Day of the general strike ===
On January 3, 1946, approximately 10,000 people in Stamford descended onto Atlantic Square for the main demonstration, which the Stamford Police Department estimated included about 5,000 members of organized labor, and about 3,000 to 5,000 other protestors. The rally, which began shortly after noon, featured multiple musical acts, and speeches by various union speakers. Workers from various surrounding plants sent delegations to Atlantic Square to support the rally. Two union locals representing nearby Condé Nast workers in Greenwich sent delegations, although Condé Nast said production in Greenwich was uninterrupted. Other union delegations included local barbers, World War II veterans, City Council workers, workers from Baer Brothers, gas and electric workers, gas, coke, and chemical workers, workers from Freydburg Brothers, workers from the International Ladies Garment Workers Union, workers from the Independent Brotherhood of Electrical Workers, and performing musicians from the American Federation of Musicians. Additional workers were instructed by the Combined Stamford Labor Organizations to continue working, including power crews at Connecticut Power, telephone operators, bus drivers, and milk deliverymen. Several unions in these fields did send representatives to the rally. Despite bus drivers not joining the strike, the sheer size of the crowd, which sometimes spilled out of Atlantic Square, impaired bus service in Stamford. The noise of the crowd also forced strike negotiations in City Hall to cease for several hours, as negotiators could not clearly hear each other. Some of the signs held by strikers addressed local shop owners, stating that the well-being of local workers was key to the fortunes of local businesses. Striking workers shut down much of Downtown Stamford's stores, theaters, and transit. Solidarity strikes were held by an addition 2,000 to 3,000 workers in Greenwich, Norwalk, and Port Chester.

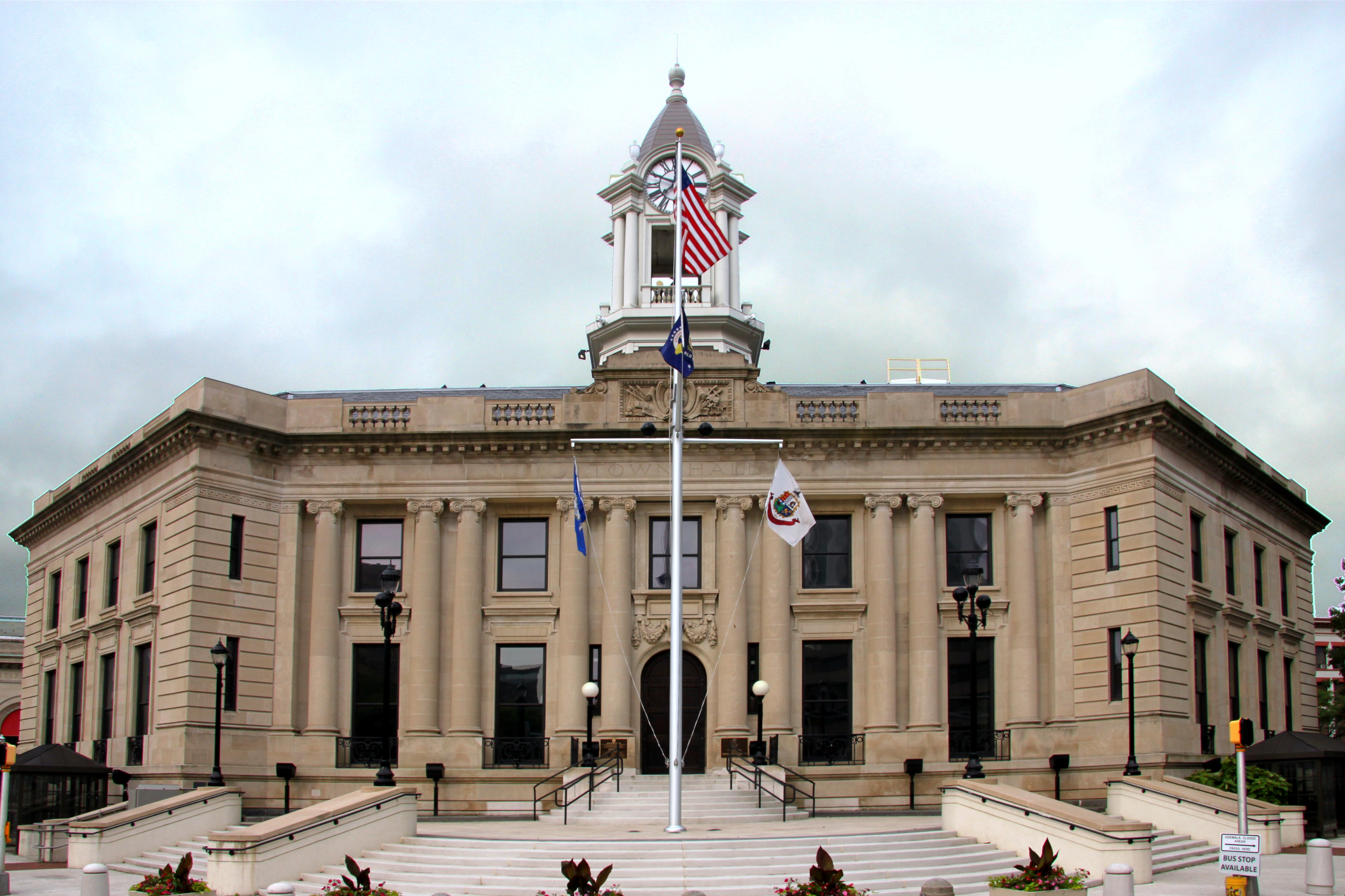
Stamford's Old Town Hall

An attorney for the striking workers said on the day of the general strike that the city's mayor, Charles E. Moore, was supporting the workers, and indeed, during negotiations that day, Moore repeatedly chided Yale & Towne. While an attorney for Yale & Towne said that the union was trying to intimidate the company, mayor, and governor, Moore interrupted to say that "the only intimidation I've seen as far as the Mayor is concerned, has been from Yale & Towne". When the attorney for the company asked how Moore had been intimidated, Moore said that "there is no guy who can intimidate me, but I'll tell you how they have tried. I was slandered and the City of Stamford was slandered all over the country because I wouldn't send police to crack skulls. Pictures were taken and mailed out, and I said to hell with you". Mayor Moore also said to the attorney that "you haven't shown the spirit of the American way. You've put forth every argument as much as to say that you won't negotiate a contract". Moore also charged that the company had hired a publicist to increase publicity of the strike, and to say "it was necessary to get the Army down here with planes".

=== Strike continuation ===
The general strike led to widespread national attention, and accelerated progress on the contract negotiation process. AFL and CIO locals began pooling resources for a strike support fund. Eight days after the general strike, the Stamford Retail Merchants Associated paid for a full-page advertisement in the Stamford Advocate in which it declared it would also support the strike fund. Yale & Towne proposed a 14% wage increase for workers, but reiterated its demand for an open shop. An official from the Department of Labor proposed a compromise settlement which would send most of the dispute to arbitration, saying "if the company doesn't follow along this suggestion...it will be clear to my mind that they are trying to bust the union". Yale & Towne rejected the proposal.

Despite this major shift in opinion, the strike continued through the early months of 1946, and incidents of violence and arrests continued. In mid-March, the AFL and CIO weighed another city-wide demonstration to try to further hasten the end of the strike.

=== End of the strike ===
On the morning of Friday, April 5th, negotiators met in New York City, and announced that they had reached a settlement to end the strike. As news of the tentative agreement reached Stamford later that morning, waves of workers who had obtained other employment during the strike (which the union estimated totaled about 1,100), quit en masse in anticipation of returning to work at Yale & Towne.

That afternoon, about 1,000 strikers attended a mass meeting called to vote on the proposed agreement. 832 votes were cast, with 563 in favor of the agreement, 251 against, and 18 voided. The agreement included a 12.5% wage increased, a closed shop agreement for the next two years, an improved vacation plan, and three paid holidays for all workers. The factory's office workers and polishers, who were not on strike, were to also be covered by the terms.

== Aftermath ==
The agreement ensured the future existence of the union at the factory, wage increases, and union security. Following the expiration of the two-year agreement in 1948, Yale & Towne began to gradually shrink its manufacturing presence in Stamford, in part due to the risk of labor unrest, but also due to difficulties in expanding its factory, and higher costs of business in the Northeast United States. During the 1950s and 1960s, Stamford experienced a decline in industry as the primary force of its economy, and began pivoting to a more diversified economy. In 1959, Yale & Towne closed its Stamford factory, which at the time of closure was employing just 450 people.

== See also ==
- History of Stamford, Connecticut
- Yale (company)
