= 2026 Orange County Teamsters strike =

Public sector strike in California, United States

- Teamsters Local 952 strike Part of International Brotherhood of Teamsters
- Date: October 13, 2026–November 16, 2026 (34 days)
- Location: Orange County, California, US; 33.780138° N, 117.888194° W
- Caused by: Stalled negoations and expired contract
- Goals: Better pay
- Methods: Walking off the worksite
- Result: Tentative contract signed

Parties
Teamsters Local 952	The Orange County administration and the Board of Supervisors

Lead figures
Eric Jimenez Sam Carlin Christian Castro	Doug Chaffee Katrina Foley K.C. Roestenberg

Number
400–1000	Unknown

Casualties
- Public services: Disruptions and delays to landfill operations, road and flood channel maintenance, park and beach upkeep, and county/first-responder vehicle repairs

== Initial strike ==
On October 8, 2026, the Teamsters Local 952 strike was announced in Orange County, California, United States, if a contract wasn't signed by October 13. then the nearly 500 public workers at Orange County Public Works, Orange County Waste and Recycling, Orange County Community Resources, and other county operations provide services for three million residents.

The strike started as planned on October 13 as the contract negotiations stalled and the contracts expired, which led the workers to declare a unfair labor practice (ULP) after the county failed to give them a fair contract. On the same day Orange County announced that both sides would meet at a press conference at 11 a.m. PT. to discuss the work stoppage and to resolve issues between them, and the strike consists of The union represents employees in Orange County Public Works, Waste & Recycling, and OC Community Resources, including heavy equipment operators, mechanics, custodial workers and animal care staff.

The following day, they reported that El Niño is coming to Orange County cities and Spectrum Local News reported that if those workers were not back to work, those waterways weren’t going to be manned for those pumps to get water out of the cities.

On October 19, Orange County said they fired back on the Teamsters Local 952 strikes as both sides are in a labor dispute, which got worse as officials from Orange County filed charges with the California Public Employment Relations Board (PERB), Orange County, California said between October 13–17 that the Local 952 Union had crossed the line from a lawful strike activity into illegal obstruction of public facilities. The county also accused them of blocking public roads, however the union said its actions were lawful, that longer traffic did not make the strike unlawful, and that in the emails included in the files, the union representatives said picketers had been instructed not to block any traffic and that workers were being allowed through.

== Trying to establish a tentative contract ==
On October 19, picket lines were established at major Orange County landfills and county headquarters, with workers beginning picketing around 6 a.m. on Monday as the county continued to increase its offer of more pay for the staff of Public Services. However, the public services sector announced that it wouldn't accept the offer until an agreement is reached, this is reported by McGraw.

Eight days after the strike started, on October 21, 2026, the Union said that they and Orange County had been having positive negotiations. Later that they, they paused their eight day strike, and all employees of the Union returned to work while continuing negotiations.

== Contract denied and renewed strike ==
On October 23, 2026, the Orange County Board of Supervisors met and they privately discussed and they offered 4% pay raise, which they first offered 3%, then four days later on October 27, 2026, the Teamsters 952 members overwhelmingly rejected the updated offer, and Teamers 952 warned that if the county fails to deliver a fair agreement then they will go on strike for a second time

The Teamsters Union also accuses Orange County saying that months of alleged bad-faith bargaining and demands wage adjustments matching the living cost, contrasting the county's lower offers with recent 25% pay raises received by Orange County supervisors. However the county says that resources are tight and they do not have enough and that any elevated pay package would trigger matching across other county bargaining units

On October 28, the Teamsters Union and Leadership Joint Council 42 set a midnight/early morning deadline after talks failed to yield a new county compromise for higher pay and on October 29, 400 workers were back on strike by 4 a.m.

== Rattifed Contract/End of Strike ==
As of November 15, 2026, Orange County employees represented by Teamsters Local 952 have ratified the new contract to end the month long strike, the Union says that it was an overwhelming vote to ratify this contract, which the last one expired on June 25, and the union also says that the workers will return Monday.
