= Chinese Golf Factory Workers Strike for Essential Rights =

2014 strike in Shenzhen, China

The Chinese Golf Factory Workers Strike for Essential Rights was a strike that happened in Shenzhen, China. On July 21, 2014, approximately 300 Chinese workers at China Qilitian Golf Articles (QLT), in Shenzhen, China, marched in a strike to obtain their essential rights as factory workers. One of the prominent leaders of the strike was Qi Jianguang, a 26-year-old man who worked at the factory for eight years. During the strike, the workers marched throughout a park in Shenzhen as they carried banners, and also took photos on their devices that were later posted on social media. They used social media in a beneficial way, to promote their campaign, and to create worldwide awareness of this event.

== Background ==
The workers for QLT produce golf balls and golf clubs for Nike, Callaway, Bridgestone, Ping, Cobra, and Titleist. The factory employed over 2,000 workers at the time of the strike, yet was proven to be disobeying the Chinese law for years. QLT failed to purchase five types of insurance that were required by law. In addition, the company deducted excessive tax on employees’ paychecks. Not only that, but China Qilitian Golf Articles also neglected to make social security contributions for its large number of employees, and deprived the workers of their basic rights. Some of these basic rights included, “payment for social insurance, funding for housing, high temperature subsidies, living wages during low production season, and also factory union elections,” (Global Nonviolent Action Database, Molly Murphy, 2015).

China Qilitian Golf Articles created another production line in Jianguanxi, China, in order to obtain a greater amount of inexpensive labour. Due to the creation of an additional location, the company began to reduce orders and relocate assets from the Shenzhen factory. The workers at the Shenzhen location were extremely worried that their workplace would close in the near future, and therefore decided to go on strike.

== Outcome ==
The strike had an immensely negative impact on QLT, which in turn, led the management team to negotiate with its employees. The strikers created a list of demands that they were determined to have met, and the organization approved the majority of the workers’ demands. The management team of QLT arranged monthly meetings to be held with workers who were democratically elected to the workers’ committee. The purpose of these meetings was to resolve any further complications after the strike, and to promote compromise amongst the management team and its employees. Other factory workers across China were inspired by the success of the nonviolent demonstrations, and many workers decided to also protect their essential rights. As a result, there was a distinct increase in the number of labour protests that occurred throughout China.
