= 1916 Mesabi Range strike =

Labor strike in Minnesota, US

- Marching striking miners
- Date: June 2, 1916 – September 21, 1916
- Location: Mesabi Range, Minnesota, US

Parties
Industrial Workers of the World; Hibbing, Minnesota	St. James Mine; Miller Mine; Northern Railway; Duluth Mining Company; Mesabi Mining Company; Oliver Iron Mining Company; St. Louis County; State of Minnesota

Lead figures
Elizabeth Gurley Flynn; Joe Greeni; Sam Scarlett; Carlo Tresca; Frank Little; Joseph Schmidt; William Wiertola; John Seppanen; George Andreytchine; Rosa Liberotti	James Myron †; John Meining; Joseph A. A. Burnquist; Martin Teller

The 1916 Mesabi Range Strike was a strike of iron miners in the Mesabi Range of Minnesota, United States. The strike began in June, and it was forcefully suppressed by the end of September. It was the second if its kind in the Minnesota Iron Range.

== Background ==
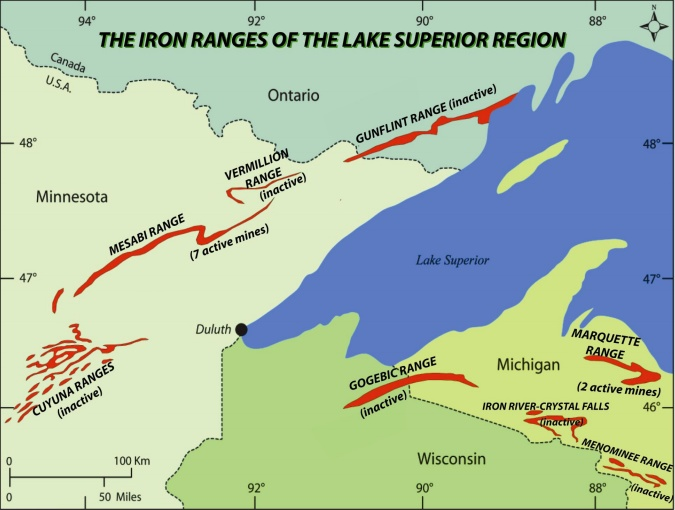
Map of the Iron Ranges

Iron mining in Minnesota began in 1892. Most of the Mesabi range was owned by Oliver Iron Mining Company (OIMC), a subsidiary of the US Steel Company, and owned by Chester A. Congdon. The miners themselves were mostly European immigrants. One prominent group were Finnish-Americans, who were staunchly pro-union and pro-socialist. In 1905, the Western Federation of Miners (WFM) was invited to organize the miners of the Mesabi Range. In 1907, a failed two-month strike failed, resulting in most Finnish workers being blacklisted. As World War I began, the United States was neutral. However, the demand for steel for war abroad grew.

The cost of living also saw a substantial increase, meaning that workers found it increasingly difficult to pay for basic necessities. Housing and rent was 20% higher than in the Twin Cities, and food ranged from 50 to 100% higher.

== The Strike ==
=== Beginnings ===
An Anti-IWW cartoon, 1916

A Pro-IWW Cartoon, 1916

The strike began on June 2, 1916, with Joe Greeni, a Czech (Note: Some sources claim he was Italian) immigrant who began protesting on his own for higher wages. He inspired other workers in Aurora to strike, and the spontaneous strike spread across the range within one week. The Industrial Workers of the World (IWW) was brought in for organization. The IWW drew up the workers demands, which were and eight-hour work day, a minimum wage, and the abolition of the contract labor system, in which miners were paid per amount of ore mined instead of a wage. The mining companies refused to negotiate. The companies began to hire armed guards to monitor worker activities and protect company property. More 1,000 guards were mobilized. Exactly how many miners were on strike was not known. The IWW estimated 16,000-20,000 men, Mayor Victor L. Power of Hibbing estimated 15,000, and the Minnesota Department of Labor and Industries estimated only 8,000. Marches were not attended only my strikers, but also by their wives and children. The IWW made an active effort to include women, and not relegate them to an auxiliary role. The women soon came up with their own list of grievances with the mining companies, including inadequate housing conditions, meager budgets, and the reasonable risk of death their husbands and other male relatives faced daily.

The first skirmish occurred on June 21, when a group of workers marching in Hibbing was carrying a banner, and a police officer in the employment of multiple mine companies (Note: Duluth Mining Company, Mesabi Mining Company, Northern Railway and OIMC) attempted to steal the flag the strikers were carrying alleging it was for 'patriotic reasons'. The resulting fight resulted in many injuries. The City of Hibbing, run by pro-union mayor Power, offered protection for the strikers.

=== Escalating violence ===
On June 22, Croatian worker John Alar was shot and killed in a skirmish with guards hired by OIMC in Virginia. Three other men were shot and lived. Eighteen year old Lucia Rosandich began a retaliatory attack on the guards. His funeral had delegations across multiple cities, including Hibbing, Chisholm, Buhl, Biwabik, Elba, and Gilbert. Attendance was estimated at 2,500-3,000. Union leader Sam Scarlett likened Alar to John Brown. The slogan 'John Alar asked for bread and they gave him lead' was circulated. A banner reading "Killed by Oliver Men" was hung at the funeral. The OIMC responded by using this as an excuse to arrest IWW organizers for libel. Two days later, another fight broke out between the strikers and the companies' armed guards. Labor organizer George Andreytchine and OIMC head of special operations Martin Teller were seriously injured. Andreytchine was arrested.

On July 3, in Biwabik, Deputy Sheriff James Myron and local businessman Tomi Ladvalla were killed. St. Louis County Sheriff John Meining responded by beginning to curb civil liberties, and arresting IWW organizers on a charge of conspiracy to murder. Freedom of speech, assembly, and the right to a speedy trial were suspended. Anti-union governor Joseph Burnquist took the opportunity to outlaw picket lines. Illegal picketing continued with no response from authorities. With most leaders arrested, the IWW struggled to continue the strike. Elizabeth Gurley Flynn was sent in as an organizer, creating cooperative stores to distribute food and good among the workers. She arrived on July 12. As Governor Burnquist called for every striker to be arrested, opposition to his authoritarian strategies began to rise. Representatives of the cities of Virginia, Hibbing, Buhl, and Eveleth publicly condemned his actions. Violence and gunfire continued, with casualties. There was an attempted bridge burning. Wives of the strikers would also begin to take action. Throwing rotten food stealing, then ruining, strikebreakers food was a common tactic. Women also participated in sabotage. Some women, such as Rosa Liberotti, participated with men in physical combat and organization.

The Federal government began to become involved, and determined that the violence was the fault of the private police forces owned by the companies. Despite the strikers proving resilient, their numbers declined due to both arrests and some choosing to seek employment in agriculture over the summer.

=== Decline ===
As resources and funds dwindled, and workers who left over the summer not returning, the national office of the IWW ceased funding to sustain the strike, likely the cause was lost. On September 17, the first groups of strikers began to vote to end the strike. On September 21, the strike officially ended with demands not met. It was said that the strike ended with "remarkable absence of violence." Most mining companies implemented pay raises and reformed the contract labor system. Eight-hour work days would also be implemented. Arrested IWW organizers were released in December.

== Gallery ==
Union leaders Elizabeth Gurley Flynn and Carlo Tresca, 1913

Striking Iron Miners & Families March under IWW Banner in Hibbing, June 21, 1916

John Alar's coffin in procession

Funeral of John Alar, June 24, 1916

Murdered by Oliver Gunmen Banner, June 24, 1916

Picnic during the strike

Parade of Striking Iron Miners, August 1, 1916

Carlo Tresca and the widowed Alar family, August 1916

Strikers Marching, August 1916

Anti-IWW Cartoon

== See also ==
- Colorado Labor Wars
- Minnesota Commission of Public Safety
