= 1907 Mesabi Range strike =

- Date: July 20, 1907 – September 1907
- Location: Mesabi Range, Minnesota

Parties
Western Federation of Miners	Oliver Iron Mining Company

Lead figures
Teofilo Petriella	Chester A. Congdon

Number
10000-16000	

The 1907 Mesabi Range Strike was a strike of iron miners in the Mesabi Range of Minnesota. It was forcefully suppressed after two months. It was the first if its kind in the Minnesota Iron Range.

== Background ==
Iron mining in Minnesota began in 1892. Most of the Mesabi range was owned by Oliver Iron Mining Company (OIMC), a subsidiary of the US Steel Company, and owned by Chester A. Congdon. The miners themselves were mostly European immigrants. One prominent group were Finnish-Americans, who were staunchly pro-union and pro-socialist. In 1905, the Western Federation of Miners (WFM) was invited to organize the miners of the Mesabi Range. Language barriers hindered effectiveness. The WFM responded by putting Teofilo Petriella in charge of organization in the state, and he created three linguistic sections; Italian, Slavic, and Finnish. By June 1907, the WFM had become strong in the region.

== The Strike ==
On July 16, 1907, dockworkers in Duluth and Superior went on strike. The WFM decided to act fast, and on July 19 the workers submitted their demands to the OIMC. The demands were an eight-hour work day, safer working conditions, and a minimum wage. 200 workers, mostly union members, were fired immediately. The following day, between 10,000 and 16,000 workers began a strike. Governor John Albert Johnson is credited with keeping the strike peaceful by not sending in any military action, as was common practice at the time. Local authorities were still hostile to the strike. On August 10, 19 miners were charged with inciting a riot and were imprisoned. Despite being against the strike, local newspapers called their imprisonment unjust. All miners were found not guilty at their trials. Local businesses refused to give the miners credit, so the workers established consumer cooperatives. These cooperatives collapsed when the companies that supplied them dropped support due to pressure from OIMC and other mining companies. The strike collapsed in September, due to pressure from privately hired strikebreakers, with Finnish strikers holding out the longest.

== Aftermath ==
The worker's demands were not met, and Finnish workers began to be blacklisted from work. 18% of miners were Finnish before the strike, and that number fell to just 8% after.

== See also ==
- 1916 Mesabi Range strike
- Colorado Labor Wars
