= 16th Battalion, Minnesota Home Guard =

Battalion of the Minnesota Home Guard

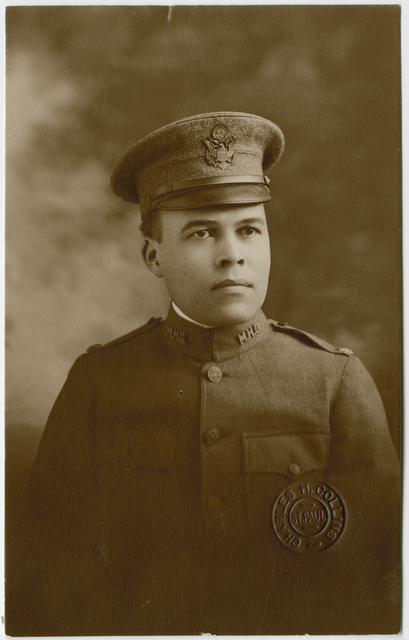
- Major Jose H. Sherwood c. 1918, commander of the 16th Battalion
- Active: 1918–1919
- Disbanded: April 25, 1919
- Allegiance: United States
- Branch: Minnesota Home Guard
- Type: Home Guard
- Engagements: World War I

Commanders
- Notable commanders: Jose H. Sherwood

The 16th Battalion, Minnesota Home Guard, sometimes referred to as the Colored Home Guards of Minnesota, was a segregated infantry battalion of the larger Minnesota Home Guard during World War I. The 16th Battalion was the first African American military unit in Minnesota state history.

== History ==
When Minnesota militia units were federalized in 1917 for World War I the state was left with no secondary troops to defend the home front. To remediate this problem, Minnesota Governor Joseph A. A. Burnquist and the Minnesota Commission of Public Safety (MCPS) created the Minnesota Home Guard on April 28, 1917. Among those who volunteered for service with the Home Guard were many African Americans, however, as the United States military was still segregated at the time, many African Americans were denied entry into White units.

Clarence W. Wigington eventually petitioned Governor Burnquist to establish an all-African American unit to serve in the Minnesota Home Guard. Wingington's petition would ultimately lead to the creation of the 16th Battalion.

=== Organization ===
Companies A and B of the 16th Battalion were organized in Saint Paul, Minnesota on April 11, 1918, meanwhile, companies C and D were organized in Minneapolis on April 26, 1918. The 16th Battalion also included two surgeons; Captain Valdo Turner and First Lieutenant James H. Redd, as well as a battalion band, and drum corps.

Original Organization of Battalion
Company	Primary place of recruitment	Officers
HQ		Major: Jose H. Sherwood Captain: Charles Sumner Smith 1st Lieutenant: George L. Hoage 1st Lieutenant: Arthur J. Todd 1st Lieutenant: William H. Howard
A	Saint Paul and Ramsey County	Captain: Clarence W. Wigington 1st Lieutenant: Earl Weber 2nd Lieutenant: J. Homer Goins
B	Saint Paul and Ramsey County	Captain: Thaddeus W. Stepp 1st Lieutenant: John F. Coquire 2nd Lieutenant: John I. Lee
C	Minneapolis and Hennepin County	Captain: Gale P. Hilyer 1st Lieutenant: Clarence C. Underwood 2nd Lieutenant: William Clack
D	Minneapolis and Hennepin County	Captain: William R. Morris 1st Lieutenant: Albert Collier 2nd Lieutenant: Patrick H. Southall

== Service ==
The 16th Battalion would ultimately not see combat during its history, however, like the rest of the Minnesota Home Guard, the 16th was primarily in charge of keeping the peace and drilling during each months muster. The 16th Battalion experienced infighting in 1918 as some men of the regiment felt that the unit should be led by officers with previous military experience, which many of the officers of the 16th Battalion did not previously have. The African American community of Minnesota eventually petitioned the Minnesota Legislature into establishing a permanent African American battalion to be part of the Minnesota National Guard.

== Disbandment ==
The 16th Battalion was eventually disbanded on April 25, 1919 shortly before the signing of the Treaty of Versailles. The 16th Battalion would eventually be renamed the First Infantry Battalion of the Minnesota Militia, which would serve permanently as a segregated battalion. Veterans of the 16th Battalion were folded into the new First Infantry Battalion, however, it was not officially made part of the Minnesota National Guard due to its segregation.

== Commanders ==
- Major Jose H. Sherwood.

== See also ==
- Racial segregation in the United States Armed Forces
- Racism against African Americans in the U.S. military
- Military history of African Americans
