= Minnesota Commission of Public Safety =

Minnesotan government commission during WW1

- Commissioners from left to right: A.C. Weiss, Thomas E. Cashman , Henry W. Libby, Gov. J.A.A. Burnquist, Clifford L. Hilton, Ambrose Tighe, Charles H. March, John F. McGee

Agency overview
- Formed: 16 April 1917
- Dissolved: 1919
- Jurisdiction: Minnesota
- Headquarters: St. Paul, Minnesota
- Employees: 7
- Annual budget: $2 Million USD (1917)
- Agency executives: J. A. A. Burnquist; John F. McGee

The Minnesota Commission of Public Safety (MCPS) was a political watchdog group created on April 16, 1917, by the Minnesota Legislature. The commission was headed by Governor of Minnesota Joseph A. A. Burnquist and Minnesota lawyer John F. McGee, the commission's purpose was to mobilize the state of Minnesota's resources during World War I.

The organization is also known for its heavy-handed nativist use of anti-German sentiment, harsh treatment and political repression of German Americans, and suppression of the Nonpartisan League and the Industrial Workers of the World in Minnesota.

== Background ==
Following America's entry into World War I in 1917, the federal government created various state programs and agencies to support the national war effort. The MCPS was Minnesota's solution to manage and prioritize the war effort on a local level in Minnesota. On March 31, 1917, senator George H. Sullivan proposed to the Minnesota Legislature the creation of a seven-person commission which was to be led by Governor Joseph A. A. Burnquist. Sullivan's proposition was approved on April 14, 1917, two days later on April 16, 1917, the commission was officially founded. The group ended up being named the Minnesota Commission of Public Safety (MCPS) and held near-dictatorial powers in both the state and local governments.

Commissioner McGee stated during the creation of the MCPS in 1917:

"The bill appropriates two million dollars and has teeth in it 18 inches long... There are provisions in it that are unconstitutional and palpably so."

== The Commission ==
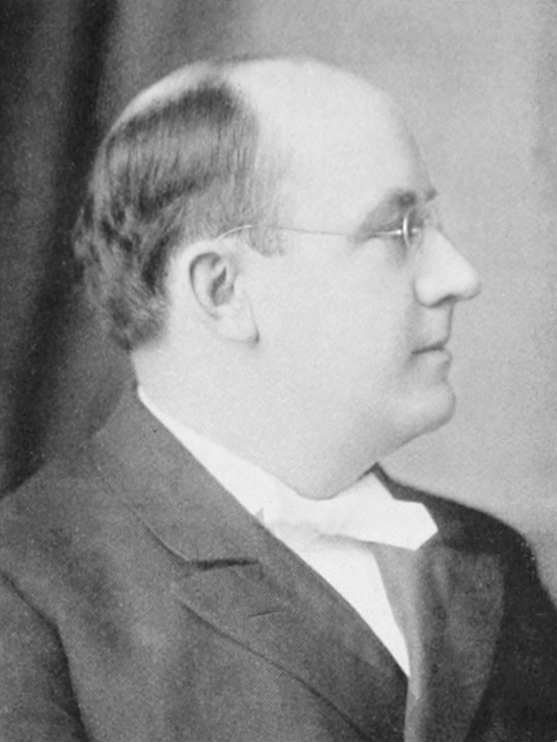
Minnesota lawyer John F. McGee, one of the chairmen of the MCPS who was instrumental in instituting many of the laws passed by the MCPS

The MCPS was made up of seven commissioners, with Republican politician and Minnesota Governor Joseph A. A. Burnquist as chairman. The commissioners of the committee were John F. McGee as the committee chair, Ambrose Tighe as vice chair, Anton Charles Weiss, Thomas E. Cashman, Clifford L. Hilton, Henry "Harry" W. Libby, and Charles Hoyt March as commissioners. Several other non-commissioned members also assisted the MCPS such as Finnish American politician Oscar Larson of Duluth and Mayor of Minneapolis A. A. Ames.

According to University of Minnesota professor and historian Hyman "Hy" Berman, the commission was modeled after public health authorities and was given a vast amount of emergency powers. Berman states that the commission presided over "a reign of terror that wiped out civil liberties, wiped out freedom of expression, wiped out freedom of association — that created a kind of climate where, in fact, it ruled by force".

== Role in Minnesota during the war ==
The MCPS was tasked with a multitude of responsibilities for the Minnesota home front during the war, namely helping to control the state's military functions, police, and public safety. During its time the MCPS provided public services including the distribution and rationing of food, controlling prices, and rationing fuel, all of which had been prioritized for the military. Similar to the modern Federal Emergency Management Agency, the MCPS was also created to assist Minnesotans during natural disasters, such as during the 1918 Tyler tornado or the Cloquet Fire. However, the MCPS is also known for its use of surveillance, intimidation, political repression, strike breaking, and other extreme tactics in the name of protecting Minnesota's citizens.

=== Minnesota Home Guard ===
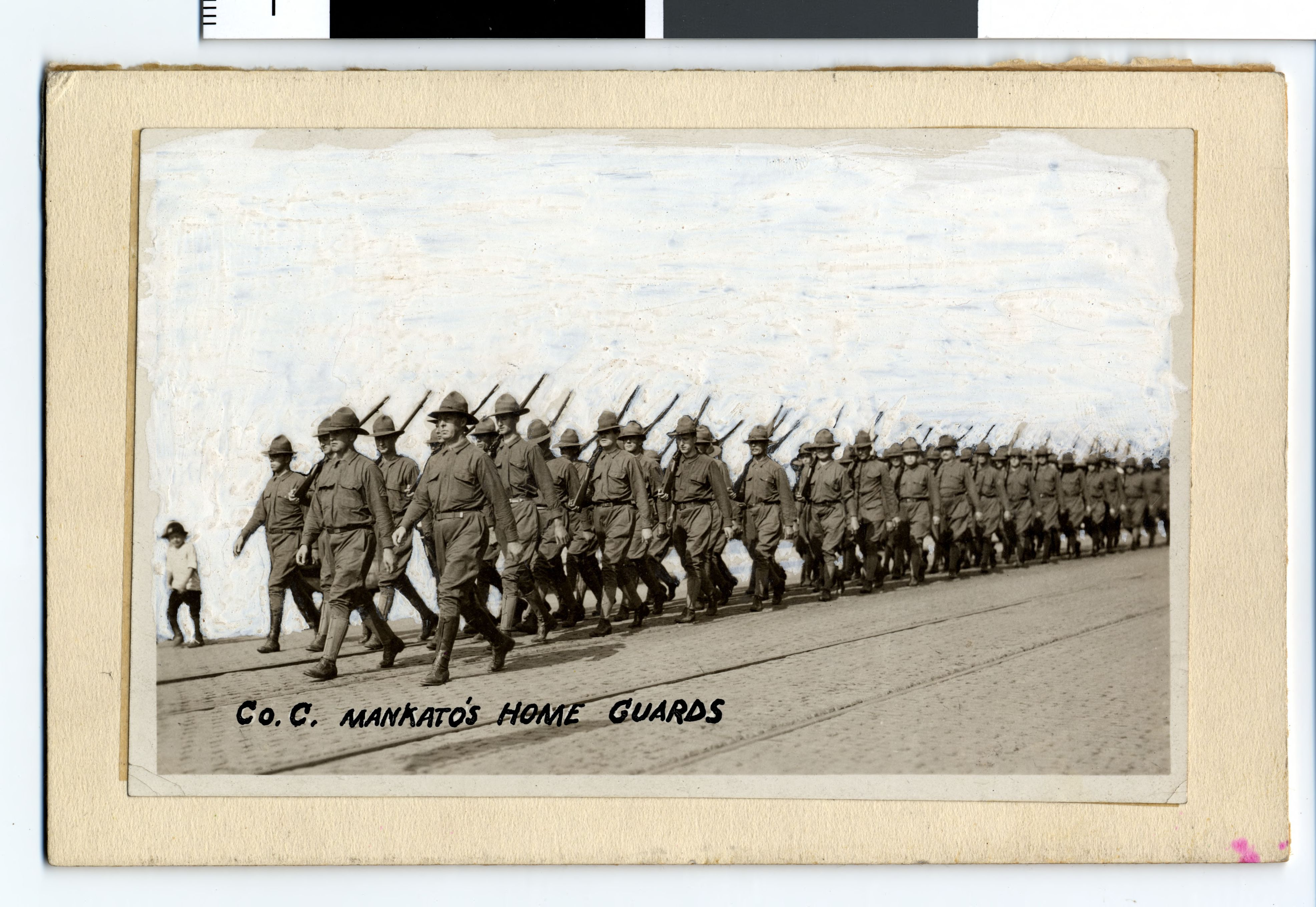
Company C of Mankato's Home Guards of the Minnesota Home Guard

During the war the National Guard and state militia became part of the regular United States Army. McGee eventually created the quasi-military arm of the MCPS, Minnesota Home Guard. The Minnesota Home Guard eventually grew to twenty-one battalions across the state, roughly 2,500 men. The Home Guard was deployed to Saint Paul during the 1917 Twin Cities streetcar strike.

=== Suppressing political opposition ===
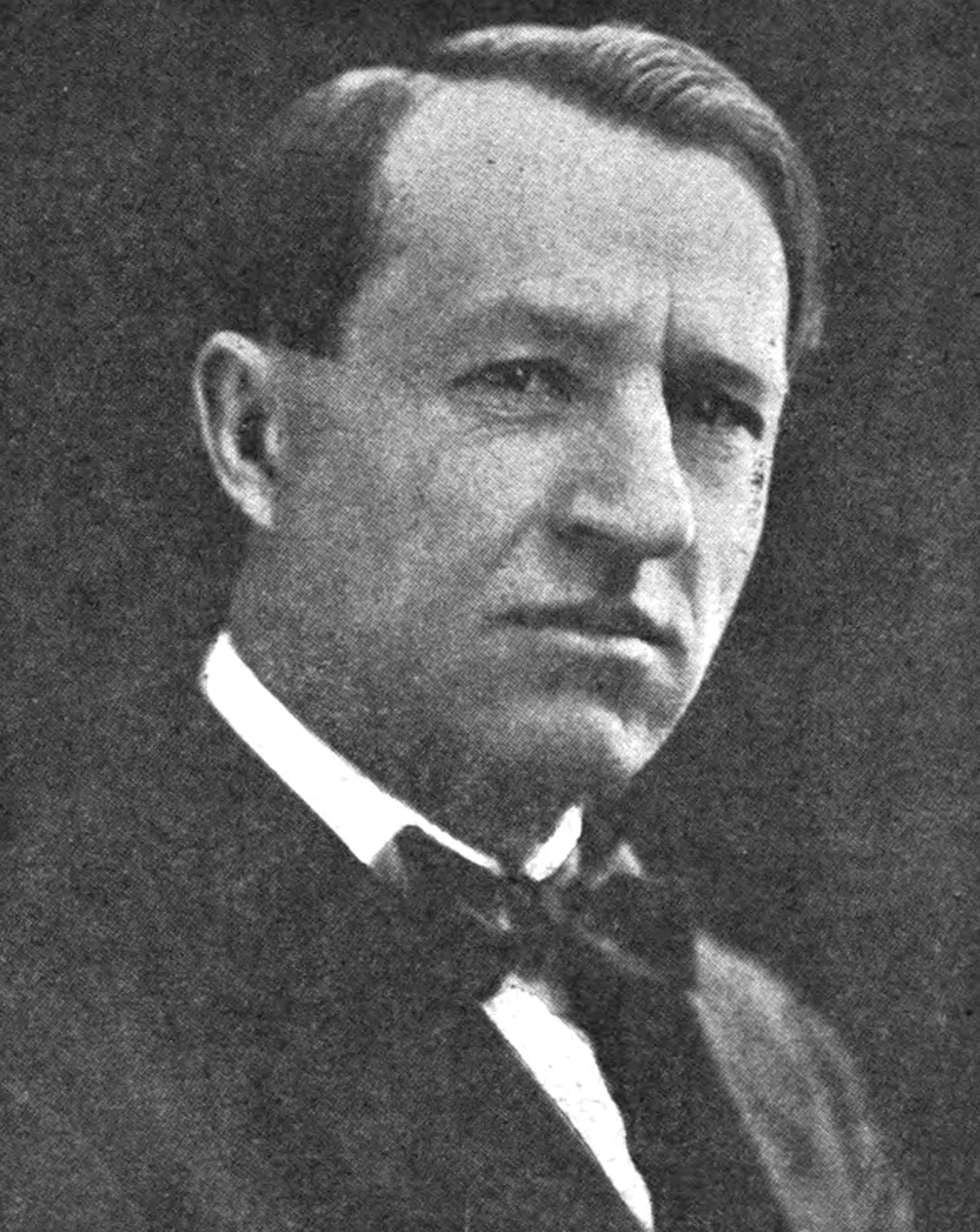
Portrait of Arthur C. Townley who founded the Nonpartisan League

According to Saint Paul College affiliate Kurt Kortenhof the MCPS went after various left-leaning political groups in Minnesota, primarily the Industrial Workers of the World (IWW) and the Nonpartisan League (NPL) due to their political and social ideologies and tendencies to not support the ongoing conflict. The NPL had been establishing regional offices all around Minnesota since 1917, the main goal of the NPL was to allow farmers to have better financial control over their products which they needed in order to do business, however, the NPL was a nuisance to the MCPS since it criticized the state's political and industrial control over Minnesota's wartime economy. According to Hyman Berman of Minnesota Public Radio, "The NPL included farm protesters who wanted better pay for their crop, who wanted a system of taxation where those who benefit from the war pay for the war".

The MCPS lacked the jurisdiction to suppress the NPL directly, so instead the MCPS denounced the NPL as an un-patriotic political organization and actively encouraged the community to stop NPL gatherings. In 1918 during the Republican gubernatorial primary the NPL chose Charles Lindbergh as their candidate, who in turn faced violent threats from the MCPS and MCPS-allied demonstrators. according to Minnesota historian Peter J. DeCarlo "Lindbergh's campaign across Minnesota revealed a divided state. In some towns he drew very large crowds, and was welcomed as a hero. In others, however, he faced violence and strong opposition". Lindbergh eventually lost to Burnquist in the Minnesota Republican primary.

Besides the NPL, the MCPS also faced issued from the Industrial Workers of the World. The IWW was headquartered in downtown Minneapolis at the time and took advantage of the ongoing labor shortage during the war, pushing for an increase in wage, better work hours, and the recognition of trade unions. The IWW had long been involved with miners and lumberjacks in northern Minnesota and were the backbone of orchestrating the 1916–1917 northern Minnesota lumber strike. The MCPS connected the IWW's socialist leanings to the Bolshevik Revolution and the general fear of international communism which eventually came to be called the first First Red Scare (1917-1920). Overall, the MSCP led an effective campaign to dismantle the IWW in Minnesota and crush labor unions.

== Role in German suppression ==
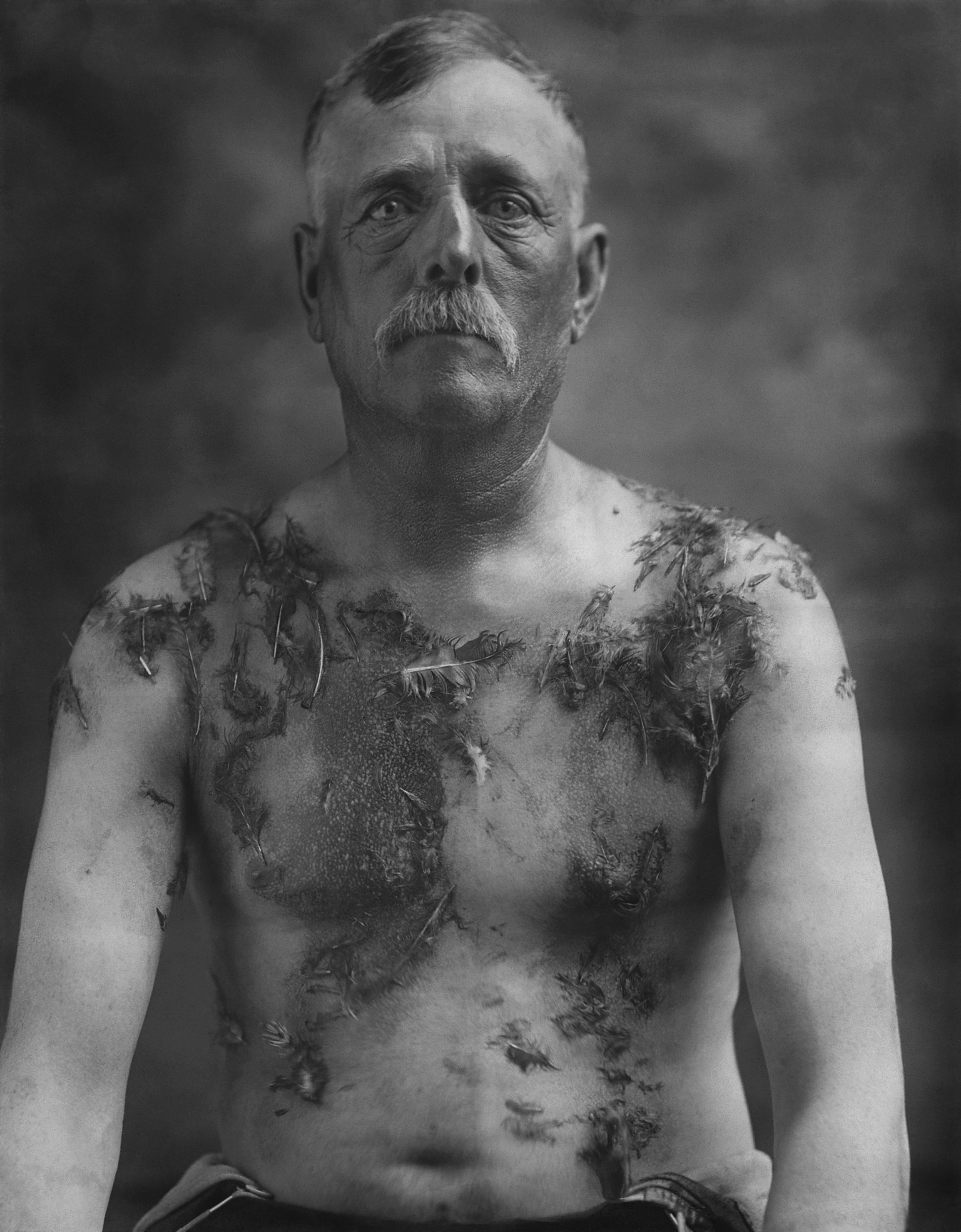
John Meintz, a German-American farmer from Luverne, Minnesota, was tarred and feathered in August, 1918 for allegedly not supporting a war bond drive. An extreme example of anti-German sentiment during the war in Minnesota

German Americans were historically a significant ethnic group which helped settle the Minnesota Territory, along with the state of Minnesota. German-speaking Minnesotans were the single largest ethnic group living in Minnesota still by 1917, accounting for roughly 70% of the states total population of 2 million citizens. Shortly before the First World War the German language was the most taught and spoken language in the state of Minnesota besides the English language. Many Americans, such as Minneapolis Bishop John Ireland promoted that English should be the only language spoken in both the church and public. Minnesotans living in rural areas such as New Ulm, Minnesota and Brown County, Minnesota were of majority German ancestry and openly opposed entry into the war.

The Selective Service Act of 1917 troubled many people in the area, so much so that many prominent citizens of New Ulm who had previously served in the military protested America's entry into the war and openly campaigned for young German-American men to not take part in the war effort. Among these prominent citizens were Dr. Louis Fritsche the mayor of New Ulm, attorney and politician Albert Pfaender, professor Adolph Ackerman of the Martin Luther College, and Albert Steinhauser a lawyer and the editor of the New Ulm Review newspaper.

=== Repression of the Government of New Ulm ===
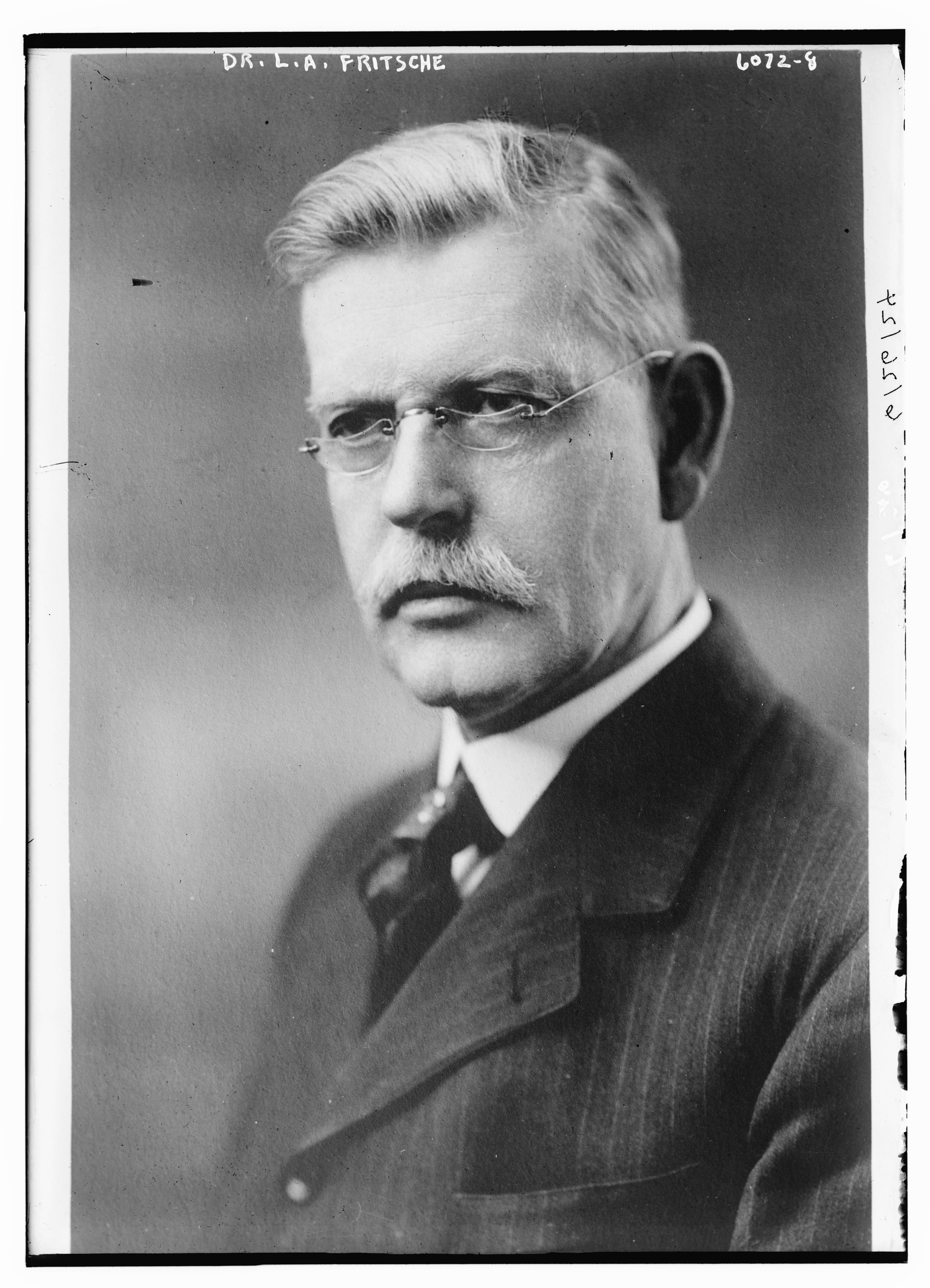
New Ulm mayor Dr. Louis A. Fritsche

The MCPS played a large role in the political repression of much of the city government of New Ulm, Minnesota. One of the stated roles of the MCPS was to protect Minnesotans from treason and subversion. Being that many of the citizens of New Ulm were first, second, and third generation Germans it was a hotbed for opposition to World War I. On July 25, 1917, a public meeting was held in New Ulm at Turner Park in order to draft men from the region into the Army and Minnesota National Guard. According to historian Paul Nelson, both Pfaender and Fritsche encouraged compliance with the nationwide draft. Pfaender argued that the government lacked the political power to send the state militia to fight overseas. Ackerman encouraged citizens to be patriotic, however Steinhauser criticized the conflict as a form of war profiteering.

Fritsche and Pfaender were eventually charged with “promoting and participating in seditious public meetings". As a consequence, Fritsche and Pfaender were both suspended from holding public office by order of Governor Burnquist. Fritsche was later found innocent, Pfaender was removed from the local county bar association, Ackerman was forced to resign as a Martin Luther College trustee, and Steinhauser was federally arrested for sedition.

== End of the Commission ==
The MCPS was eventually disbanded in 1919 when the war in Europe had ended on November 11, 1918. The MCPS was abolished by legislative act on April 14, 1919, and passed in a vote of 107–12. The MCPS met for the last time in December 1920 and never returned to power, even during World War II. With the commissions' demise and the end of the war, anti-German nativism lost much of its momentum. The MCPS had a lasting political and social affect on the citizenry, politics, and work industry of Minnesota and had effectively banned the German language from being spoken publicly in Minnesota.
