= Virginia–Rainy Lake Lumber Company Office =

- U.S. National Register of Historic Places
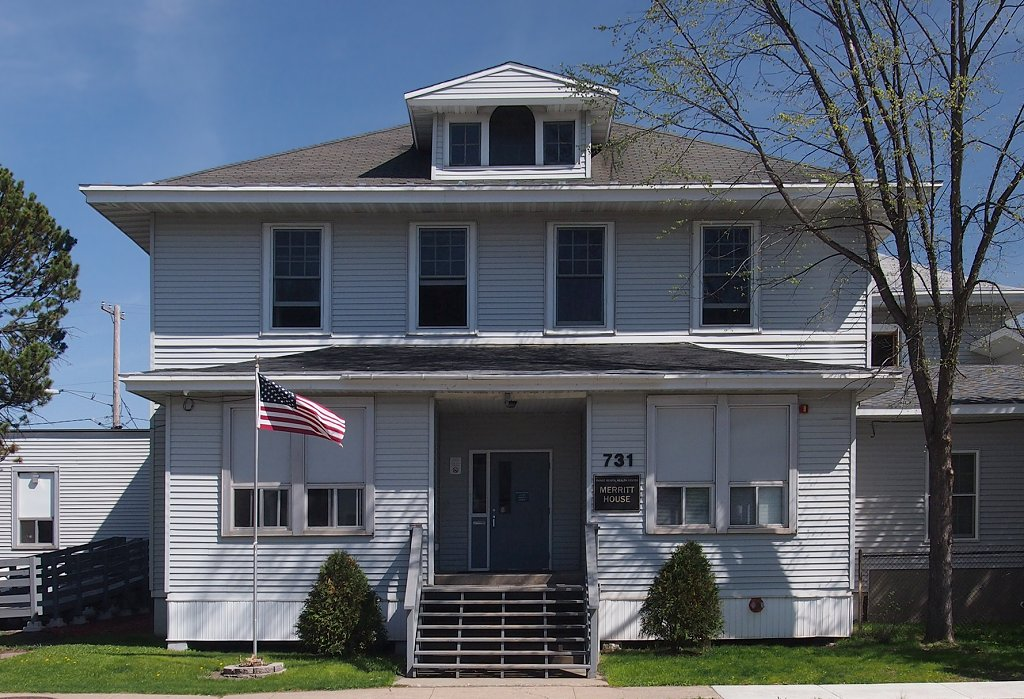
- The Virginia–Rainy Lake Lumber Company Office from the south

- Location within Minnesota Location within the United States
- Location: 731 3rd Street S., Virginia, Minnesota
- Coordinates: 47°31′21″N 92°32′8″W
- Area: Less than one acre
- Built: c. 1907
- NRHP reference No.: 80004365
- Added to NRHP: August 26, 1980

The Virginia–Rainy Lake Lumber Company Office is a former office building in Virginia, Minnesota, United States. It was built around 1907 as the headquarters for the Virginia–Rainy Lake Lumber Company, the largest lumber company in the Upper Midwest in the early 20th century. The building was listed on the National Register of Historic Places in 1980 for its state-level significance in the theme of industry. It was nominated for representing one of the Iron Range's few major industries aside from mining.

As of 2018 the building functions as Merritt House, an intensive residential treatment center operated by the Range Mental Health Center. The nearby Virginia–Rainy Lake Lumber Company Manager's Residence is also on the National Register of Historic Places. As of 2022 the building functions as Wellstone Crisis Center

== Virginia-Rainy Lake Lumber Company ==
In 1901, William O'Brien and Wirt H. Cook organized the Duluth, Virginia, and Rainy Lake Railway (DV&RL) to transport logs from their remote logging operations to sawmills. Along with the Virginia Lumber Company and the Minnesota Land and Construction Company, it became a subsidiary of the Virginia & Rainy Lake Company (V&RL) which incorporated in 1905.

In 1908, the company offloaded DV&RL to a holding company before merging with Frederick E. Weyerhaeuser and Edward Hines. After the merge, the V&RL was the largest white pine lumber company in the world, controlling nearly three billion board feet valued around $20 million, and owning a sawmill which could process one million board feet of lumber a day. The new board elected Hines, the company's largest single shareholder, to the role of company president.

In 1916 and 1917, the IWW strikes heavily impacted the V&RL which employed about 1,200 mill workers and 2,000 lumberjacks. V&RL mill workers began the first strike on December 28 with several hundred strikers picketing outside the V&RL plant in Virginia. The total number of workers on strike constituted a majority of the 1,200 workers and may have been as high as 1,000. As a result, one of the plant's two sawmills closed, while the other continued to operate only on a sporadic and reduced basis. Lumberjacks joined the strike on January 1, 1917. Prior to the strike, V&RL average daily wage was $4.94; following the strike, they never fell below $11.72.

The company pursued a policy of clearcutting in the name of fire prevention. As company profits dwindled in the 1920s, the company under Hines continued to clearcut to "convert [timber] into money as rapidly as possible". By the late 1920s, the company needed to log more acreage to make enough money to function, with 30,000 acres of logging yielding 84 million board feet in 1928 compared to 130 million board feet in 1915. The company was competing with Pacific Northwest logging, and closed after the 1929 season.

The V&RL manufactured roughly 2.5 billion feet of lumber through capital expenses exceeding 30 million, and constructed 143 camps with an average of 15 in operation each year. In 1937, Minnesota's last log drive occurred.

== See also ==
- National Register of Historic Places listings in St. Louis County, Minnesota
