= Minnesota Home Guard =

American volunteer state defense force

- Flag of the 13th Battalion of the Minnesota Home Guard
- Active: 1917–1920
- Disbanded: December, 1920
- Country: United States
- Allegiance: Minnesota
- Branch: Army
- Type: State defense force
- Role: Military reserve force
- Size: 7,000+ (Home Guard); 2,583 (Motor Corps)
- Engagements: First World War; 1917 Twin Cities streetcar strike

Commanders
- Governor of Minnesota: J. A. A. Burnquist
- Adjutant General of Minnesota: Walter Fred Rhinow

The Minnesota Home Guard (MHG) was a volunteer reserve force of the state of Minnesota during World War I. The MHG, along with the Minnesota Motor Corps (MMC) were originally organized in 1917 by the Minnesota Commission of Public Safety with the purpose of protecting state assets while the National Guard was deployed during the war. Both the MHG and MMC were established in order to preform both civil and military duties including riot control, emergency management, funerals, and honor guards. The Minnesota Home Guard also acted as special deputized military police which were under the direct control of the Adjutant General of Minnesota and the Governor of Minnesota.

== History ==
=== The Home Guard ===
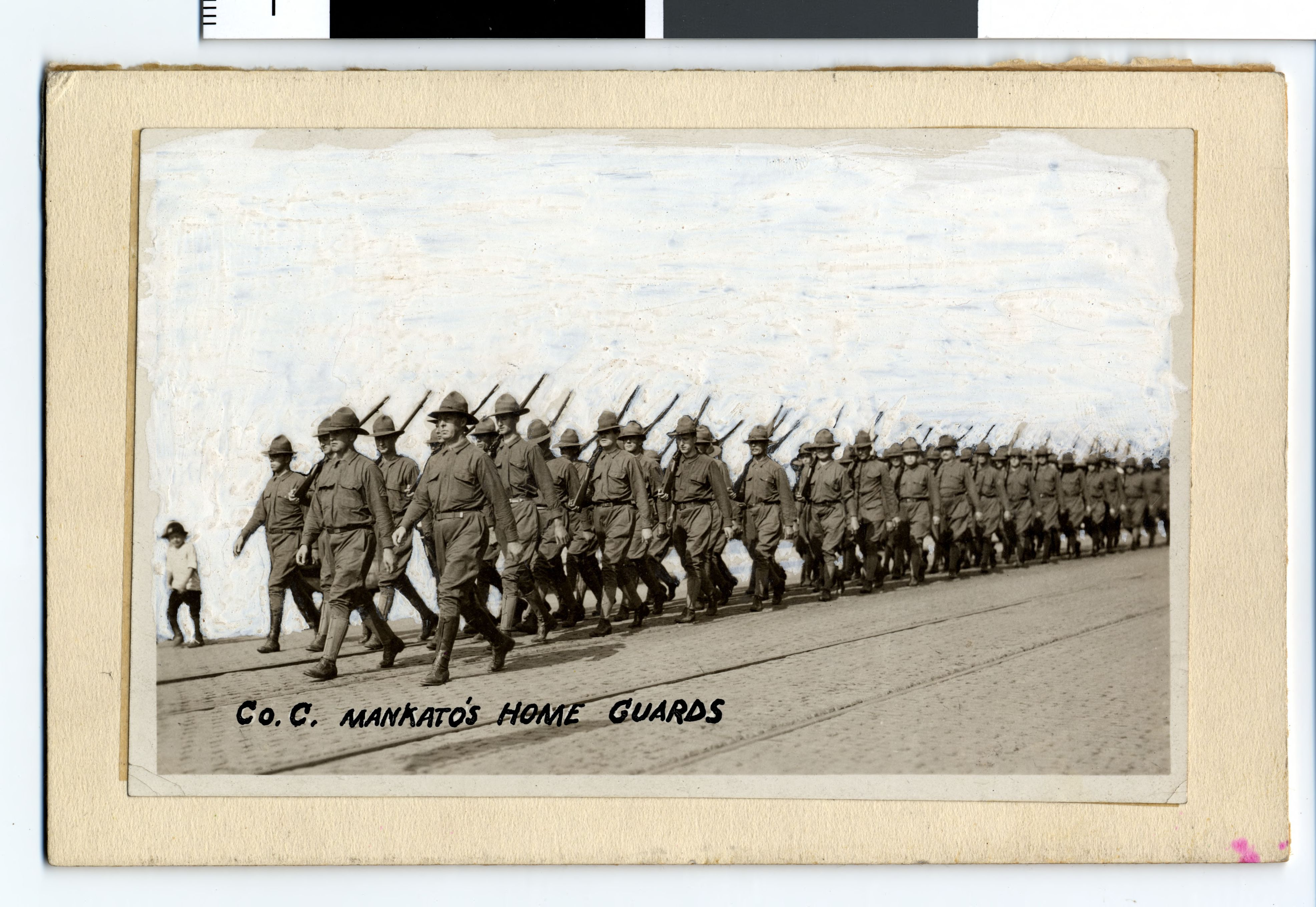
Company C of Mankato's Home Guards

The Minnesota Commission of Public Safety (MCPS) was created on April 16, 1917 shortly after America's entry into World War I, likewise on April 28, 1917, the MHG was established. The MHG was the unofficial armed force of the MCPS, created specifically to enforce the MCPS’s orders, many of which were considered infringements. The MHG was an entirely volunteer force as opposed to a conscripted force. Volunteers in MHG service were not paid unless they committed to extended active duty. Only men over the age of 26 were recruited for the MHG. Battalions of the MHG were based upon cities and counties, for example Company B of the 6th Battalion was recruited almost entirely from Fairmont, Minnesota.^{:36-37} Over the course of the war, the MHG eventually consisted of 23 battalions with 7,000+ personnel.^{:211}

=== 16th Battalion ===
The MHG was also the only military unit in the state of Minnesota that provided an African American unit, the 16th Battalion, which was racially segregated. The 16th Battalion, also called the Colored Home Guards of Minnesota, became the first Minnesotan military unit in state history to accept African Americans. The 16th Battalion was created by Clarence W. Wigington in 1918 after petitioning Governor Burnquist to create a similar organization for black Minnesotans who also wanted to serve. The 16th Battalion of the MHG was commanded by Wigington and originally consisted of only two companies but was increased to four companies consisting over roughly 500 volunteers.

=== Motor Corps ===
Similar to the MHG, the Minnesota Motor Corps (MMC) was founded in 1917 under the auspices of the MCPS. The MMC was founded by Minnesota businessman Roy B. Simming. The MMC essentially acted as a more mobile version of the MHG and double over as traffic police and were under the shared authority of both local sheriffs and the state military. The MMC was controlled by Minnesota Adjutant General Rhinow. The MMC was organized into a brigade of 10 battalions of roughly 2,583 personnel. The MMC consisted of additional support units including a medical detachment, airplane detachment, and a Red Cross auxiliary unit.

== Use and disbandment ==
The MCPS used the MHG as private police and special deputies to break labor strikes, for example, the MHG was used to break the 1917 Twin Cities streetcar strike. The MHG was also used during several natural disasters from 1917 to 1919, including both the Cloquet Fire and the 1918 Tyler tornado. The MHG was dissolved by December, 1920 following the dissolution of the MCPS.
