= Virginia–Rainy Lake Lumber Company Manager's Residence =

Historic house in Minnesota, United States

- U.S. National Register of Historic Places
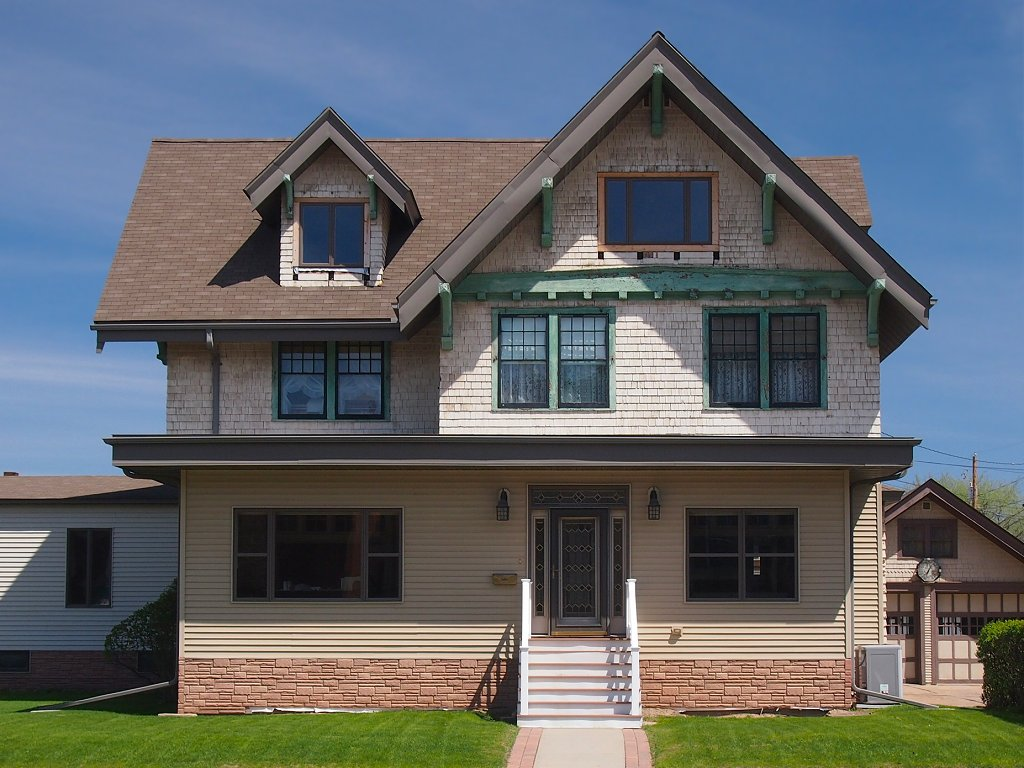
- The Virginia–Rainy Lake Lumber Company Manager's Residence from the west

- Location within Minnesota Location within the United States
- Location: 402–404 S. 5th Avenue, Virginia, Minnesota
- Coordinates: 47°31′12.7″N 92°32′17.5″W
- Area: Less than one acre
- Built: 1910
- Built by: Virginia–Rainy Lake Lumber Company
- Architectural style: Bungalow/Craftsman, Mission/Spanish Revival
- NRHP reference No.: 80004361
- Added to NRHP: August 18, 1980

The Virginia–Rainy Lake Lumber Company Manager's Residence is a historic house in Virginia, Minnesota, United States. It was built in 1910 to provide upscale quarters for the manager of the Virginia–Rainy Lake Lumber Company, the largest lumber company in the area. The house was listed on the National Register of Historic Places in 1980 for its local significance in the themes of industry and social history. It was nominated for reflecting the social distance enforced between industry elites and laborers in the early 20th century. The city's working class population at the time was crowded into boarding houses and small cottages, and it was common for large companies to erect lavish residences for their managerial class in the belief that telegraphing class distinctions was essential for maintaining workforce discipline.

The house has since been converted into a funeral home, with a one-story chapel wing built on to the north. The nearby Virginia–Rainy Lake Lumber Company Office is also on the National Register of Historic Places.

== See also ==
- National Register of Historic Places listings in St. Louis County, Minnesota
