= 1917 Bloomington Streetcar Strike =

Labor dispute in Illinois, US

Bloomington Streetcar Strike of 1917
- Part of streetcar strikes in the United States
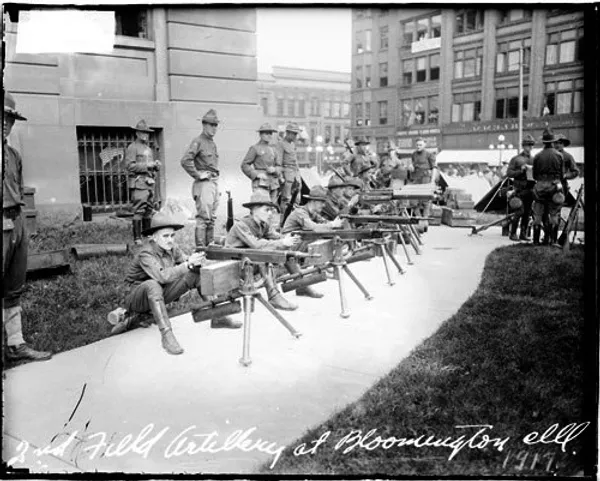
- Illinois National Guard troops surrounding the Bloomington’s courthouse square
- Date: May 28 – July 9, 1917 (109 years ago)
- Location: Bloomington, Illinois
- Result: Daily pay increased by 35¢ Workday decreased from 9:20 to 9:00 hours Union Recognition; Wrongful termination protections

Parties
Amalgamated Transit Union Local 752; Sympathy strikers	B&N Street Railway; Illinois National Guard

Lead figures
Mother Jones	US Rep. & owner of B&N: William B. McKinley

Number
~200 Streetcar Strikers 1,200 sympathy strikers, C&A Railroad repair shops B&N power plant sympathy strikers	1,400 National Guard
- Original pay before the strike was $2.25/day, for a nine-and-a-half-hour workday

The 1917 Bloomington Streetcar Strike was a labor dispute starting on May 28, 1917 (Note: Sources conflict on the starting date of the strike. ATU Local 752 mistakenly states April 28, 1917 for its history. While the Mother Jones museum & McLean County Museum state March 28, 1917 which aligns with all the primary sources.) when ATU Local 752 called a strike for union recognition, increased pay, and a shortened workday.

Facing a strike, Bloomington & Normal Street Railway & Light offered a 20¢ a day increase before the strike but refused to give union recognition, so the union struck. A month into the strike Mother Jones rallied for the cause.

It ended in July when the mayor of Bloomington, E.E. Jones, mediated contract talks between the workers and company from July 6 to 9. During this, Illinois National Guard had been stationed outside the courthouse where mediation was occurring and B&N's power plant, equipped with machine gun emplacements.

An agreement was reached on July 9, 1917, in a victory for the union, winning recognition, reduced hours, and increased pay.

== See also ==
- 1917 Twin Cities streetcar strike
