= Lillian Anderson Turner Alexander =

Educator and civil rights activist (1876-1957)

- Born: Lillian Anderson; May 2, 1876; Yellow Springs, Ohio, U.S.
- Died: September 12, 1957 (aged 81); New York City, U.S.
- Occupations: Educator, civil rights activist, and club woman
- Spouses: Valdo Turner (m. 1896; div. 1918) Dr. Ernest Alexander (m. 1918)

Lillian Anderson Turner Alexander (1876–1957) was an educator, social worker, civil rights activist, and club woman active in St. Paul, Minnesota, and New York City. Before 1918, she was known as Lillian A. Turner with her first husband's surname. After 1918, she used her second husband's surname and was known as Lillian A. Alexander.

== Biography ==
Lillian Anderson was born in Yellow Springs, Ohio, on May 2, 1876. She was the daughter of Sanford and Polly Anne Anderson. She had two brothers, Henry Anderson and Charles Anderson.

In 1896, she married physician Val Do Turner, and in 1889, they moved to St. Paul, Minnesota. By 1918, Turner and Val Do Turner had divorced. Turner moved to New York City to work for the National Urban League. Turner was listed on the 1920 census in New York as divorced and working in social work.

=== Education ===
Turner attended high school in Springfield, Ohio.

Turner worked as an educator in a variety of contexts, including a school teacher, Sunday school training teacher, and volunteer social worker. Her Sunday school training included five years teaching officers, teachers, and students from colored Protestant denominations. She also traveled to Florida in winter 1913 to train teachers, visit schools, and organize women's and girls' clubs for community improvement. She attended special Chicago University courses.

During her time in Florida, she traveled with Margaret Murray Washington on her speaking tour across the state.

In 1914, Turner was inspired by attending the commencement ceremony of Fisk University. She joined the Fisk Club and was the only member not to be enrolled at Fisk or married to someone enrolled, and thus the club members dubbed her their "mascot."

She enrolled at the University of Minnesota in 1914, where she studied sociology and anthropology. She was the first student of color to receive Phi Beta Kappa recognition at the university. The last half year of her program conducting research at Wilberforce University and other areas around Ohio, focusing on Physical Anthropology. Turner graduated in February 1918 with honors, after only 3.5 years.

=== Activism and club work ===
Turner was involved in the women's club community. She was the honorary president of the Minnesota Association of Colored Women's Clubs. In 1909, she was president of the Colored Women's State Federation of Clubs. In 1909, she was celebrated by the group and led three talks called "The Work of Women in the Uplift of the Race." Additionally, she was the district club organizer of the Northwestern states. In 1914, she was the secretary of the St. Paul chapter of NAACP.

Turner volunteered as a social worker through the club and was a social service worker for the Juvenile Court of St. Paul. She was there for seven years and handled widows' pensions and children's work. She received accolades for her work placing Black children into good homes. This inspired her to pursue higher education, as she felt she needed a wider understanding of the scope of social work and the social history of Black people in order to relate to the time's problems.

Turner used her skills towards women's suffrage. Her work, "Votes for Housewives," was published in the August 1915 edition of The Crisis and it was seen as a witty and clever piece. In 1919, she wrote another piece for The Crisis that explained the work done by the National Urban League. Eventually, she became the treasurer of The Crisis Publishing Company.

The National Urban League of New York City recruited Turner, now Alexander, upon her graduation in 1918, and she moved to pursue the job. She became the assistant to Eugene Kinckle Jones. During her time at the National Urban League, her duties primarily involved aiding the large migration of Southern African Americans into Northern industries surrounding the First World War and helping them find wartime employment.She continued to travel and speak with groups on topics such as "Women now in Industries." When the National Urban League expanded its facilities to conduct more research, the new Department of Research came under the charge of Turner.

Alexander was one of the earliest life members of the NAACP and sat on its board of directors from 1924 to her death. In 1924, Alexander became a board member of the NAACP, and she is also supposedly one of the organization's earliest life members. However, she was more than just a member. Alexander was the treasurer of the Crisis, the official magazine of the NAACP, and was Chairman of the nominating committee for the NAACP. Alexander and DuBois were very close friends. They exchanged many letters, some discussing DuBois and his wife coming up to Alexander's summer home, and some pertaining to the NAACP and the Crisis. Lillian Alexander attended the 1933 Amenia conference. It has been speculated that her appointment to the NAACP’s nominating committee in October of that year came out of this conference. She was a member of the Committee of Management of the West 137 Street Branch of the YWCA for 35 years, and served on the board of directors for the YWCA of the City of New York.

In 1934, Governor Herbert H. Lehman appointed her to the Commission on Urban Colored Population.

She was a member of the board of governors of the Warwick State Training School for Boys and the National Housing Conference. She was also a member of the Board of Management of the Columbus Hill Day Nursery.

Alexander founded Club Caroline, a cooperative housing project in Harlem for working girls, sponsored by the Association for the Proper Housing of Girls. Club Caroline was a housing project created for single black working women in Harlem. While the date of when it was founded is unclear, it is known that the club got its funding from Caroline Phelps Stokes Fund. This trust funded many charities and organizations, with one notable organization being the Brookings Institution. Another clear connection is that Alexander used her connections through the 137th YWCA board to help her with Club Caroline. Two of the known members of the board of Club Caroline, Ethel May Caution and Ruth Roberts, also served on the board of the 137th YWCA. While not much is written about Club Caroline, there is one article that was written for the Federal Writers Project during the Great Depression. This article highlights the work being done by the group as well as the growth of the organization during the time of the depression. The article also sings the praise of the organization, saying that “the humanitarian work started by this group belongs to the ages.”

=== Remarriage ===
On June 10, 1918, Lillian Turner married Dr. Ernest R. Alexander. He was a well-known physician at Harlem Hospital, and the couple lived in the Sugar Hill area of Harlem. They hosted an exclusive annual picnic at Green Lake, New York, where attendees were known for being the "in" crowd. Attendees included Ethel Ray Nance and Regina M. Anderson.

=== Death and legacy ===
Lillian A. Alexander died on September 12, 1957, at Tuxedo Memorial Hospital in New York. She was 81 years old and was survived by her husband and her brothers.

== Name confusion ==
In his autobiography, Roy Wilkins wrote about Sally Alexander, "an old friend from St. Paul," who has several details that match Lillian Turner. In 1931, the Alexanders hosted a black-tie dinner for Wilkins and his wife, Aminda "Minnie" Badeau. Wilkins describes her as a formidable woman with a fierce interest in the NAACP, who had become a close friend and ally of W. E. B. Du Bois. It is possible that Sally Alexander is Lillian Turner using her second husband's surname.

== See also ==
- African-American women's suffrage movement
- Black suffrage in the United States
- The Crisis
