= 1916–1917 northern Minnesota lumber strike =

Labor strike in northern Minnesota, US

- Date: December 28, 1916 – February 1, 1917 (1 month and 4 days)
- Location: Northern Minnesota, United States (Note: The strike primarily centered around Virginia, Minnesota, as this was the headquarters for the local union and the location of the Virginia and Rainy Lake Lumber Company's plant. A sawmill owned by the International Lumber Company in International Falls, Minnesota, was also affected by the strike. Most of the logging camps affected by the strike were located in either St. Louis County or Koochiching County.)
- Caused by: Low pay and poor working conditions
- Goals: Increased pay, improved living conditions, reduced hours, and changes to scheduling
- Methods: Picketing; Strike action; Walkout
- Result: Lumber companies raise pay and institute some improvements to living conditions in logging camps; IWW presence in the region severely damaged

Parties
Industrial Workers of the World; Metal Mine Workers' Industrial Union No. 490	Virginia and Rainy Lake Lumber Company; International Lumber Company

The 1916–1917 northern Minnesota lumber strike was a labor strike involving several thousand sawmill workers and lumberjacks in the northern part of the U.S. state of Minnesota, primarily along the Mesabi Range. The lumber workers were organized by the Industrial Workers of the World (IWW) and primarily worked for the Virginia and Rainy Lake Lumber Company, whose sawmill plant was located in Virginia, Minnesota. Additional lumberjacks and mill workers from the International Lumber Company were also involved. The strike first began with the Virginia and Rainy Lake mill workers on December 28, 1916, and among the lumberjacks on January 1, 1917. The strike lasted for a little over a month before it was officially called off by the union on February 1, 1917. Though the strike faltered by late January and had resulted in many arrests and the suppression of the IWW's local union in the region, the union claimed a partial victory, as the lumber companies instituted some improvements for the lumberjacks' working conditions.

The roots of this strike stemmed from a previous strike involving miners on the Mesabi Range that ended in a partial victory for the workers. During this strike, the IWW became involved and established a local union in the region called the Metal Mine Workers' Industrial Union No. 490, which was based in Virginia. Following the end of the miners' strike, Local 490 began to organize lumber workers in the region. At the time, the Virginia and Rainy Lake Lumber Company operated the world's largest white pine sawmill plant in Virginia, which employed about 1,200 workers, and they had roughly 2,000 lumberjacks on their payroll at any given time. Through late 1916, Local 490 continued to organize these workers, working alongside the Agricultural Workers Organization No. 400, a subgroup of the IWW that had been trying to organize lumberjacks in the region for the past year. By December 1916, more militant individuals within the union were calling for a strike against the company, though IWW higherups such as General Secretary-Treasurer Bill Haywood were wary of this, thinking that there had not been enough time to adequately plan and organize a successful strike. Nonetheless, on December 24, 1916, about 700 workers met to create a list of demands for both the mill workers and the lumberjacks that included reduced working hours, higher pay, better working conditions, and changes to scheduling. On the morning of December 28, with the company refusing to institute these changes, up to 1,000 workers, representing a majority of the mill's 1,200-person workforce, went on strike and began picketing outside the plant. At the same time, messengers were sent to the logging camps throughout the area to convince the lumberjacks to strike, and over 2,000 did so between January 1 and 2.

In its first few days, the strike was successful in partially shutting down Virginia and Rainy Lake's plant and several logging camps in the region, while a sawmill owned by the International Lumber Company in International Falls was also affected by a walkout. However, early on, lumber management began to work with local law enforcement agencies and public officials to break the strike. Strikebreakers were brought in from other areas of the state, while police arrested dozens of strikers and IWW leaders on questionable charges. Additionally, many local municipalities began to enact laws that outright banned the IWW from their jurisdictions, with members facing either expulsion or imprisonment. By mid-January, many of the local IWW leaders had been arrested, while striking lumberjacks began to abandon the strike. With the help of deputized sheriffs acting for the companies, many logging camps began to resume operations within a week of the initial lumberjack walkouts, and many mill workers began to return to work due to low strike pay. Finally, on February 1, the remaining leadership of Local 490 met in Duluth and declared the strike over.

The IWW was able to claim a partial victory in the strike, as lumber companies instituted some changes to address the lumberjacks' poor working conditions and low pay. However, the strike had severely damaged Local 490's presence on the Mesabi Range, and while the IWW had planned to launch another organizing drive in the area, U.S. involvement in World War I and the accompanying suppression of the IWW by state and federal governments hurt these plans. In 1917, Minnesota enacted a criminal syndicalism law aimed in part at the IWW, and in September of that year, an IWW individual in Minnesota became the first person in the U.S. to be convicted under such a law. During the 1920s and 1930s, organizing efforts among lumber workers in the area would be taken over by the affiliate unions of the American Federation of Labor and the Committee for Industrial Organization. Discussing the strike in a 1971 article, historian John E. Haynes said, "The resolution of that strike helped redefine the boundaries of permissible political and economic dissent in Minnesota, virtually erased the specter of strong IWW influence on the iron range, and served as a precedent for the state's treatment of dissenters during World War I".

== Background ==
=== Miners' strike on the Mesabi Range ===
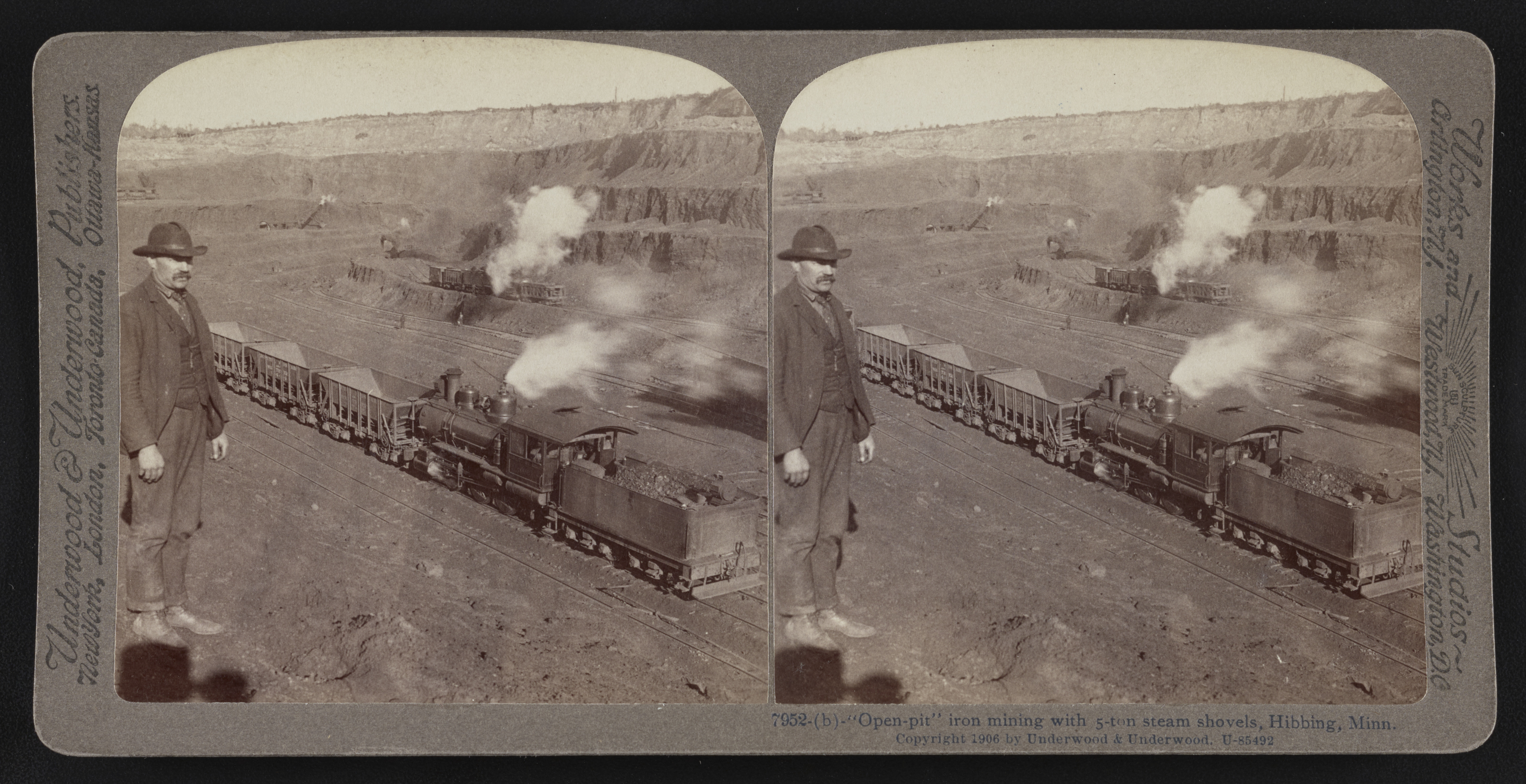
Open-pit mine on the Mesabi Range, c. 1906

In mid-1916, miners on the Mesabi Range in northern Minnesota launched a spontaneous labor strike. The range, situated about 75 miles (121 km) north of the city of Duluth, was a major iron ore mining region and part of the larger Iron Range. This strike began with a walkout led by Joe Greeni, a Czech immigrant, on June 2, and at its peak it involved several thousand miners, primarily immigrants. The labor dispute lasted for several months, but by September, with strike funds running low, numerous instances of violent confrontations between strikers and law enforcement officials, and many of the strike leaders imprisoned, miners began to return to work, and the strike officially ended on September 17. Despite the strike ending without a labor contract in place between the miners and the mining companies on the range, many of the companies began instituting changes to address the causes of the strike, such as increased pay and an eight-hour workday.

=== IWW presence in northern Minnesota ===
During the strike, union organizers from the Industrial Workers of the World (IWW) helped to organize the miners. The IWW, whose members are known as Wobblies, had been established in Chicago in 1905 at a meeting of socialists and miners from the Western United States. The organization was a radical anti-capitalist union that advocated for industrial unionism and the concept of the One Big Union. Over the next decade, the union had established a presence in Minnesota, organizing a local union of lumberjacks in Deer River in 1910 and participating in free speech fights in Duluth and Minneapolis in the early 1910s. However, the miners' dispute had caught the union off guard. Despite this, shortly after it began, the IWW established a local union in Virginia, a city of slightly over 10,000 people on the range, and helped the miners to coordinate strike actions and write a list of demands to the mining companies. The local union, Metal Mine Workers' Industrial Union No. 490, was based out of the Finnish Socialist Hall, a meeting hall for socialists among Virginia's community of Finnish immigrants. Many Finns in the area had been involved in the strike and were supportive of socialist ideals and the IWW in particular, and socialist halls such as the one in Virginia existed in many of the towns along the Mesabi Range, serving as centers for community life. During this time, Local 490 established many branches in cities throughout the range. Following the end of the strike, Local 490 remained as the largest IWW organization in northern Minnesota, with about 2,000 of the 10,000 to 15,000 miners who participated in the strike remaining members. The local union was led by secretary-treasurer Charles Jacobson, a long-time native of Virginia who worked as a miner.

=== Lumber industry in northern Minnesota ===
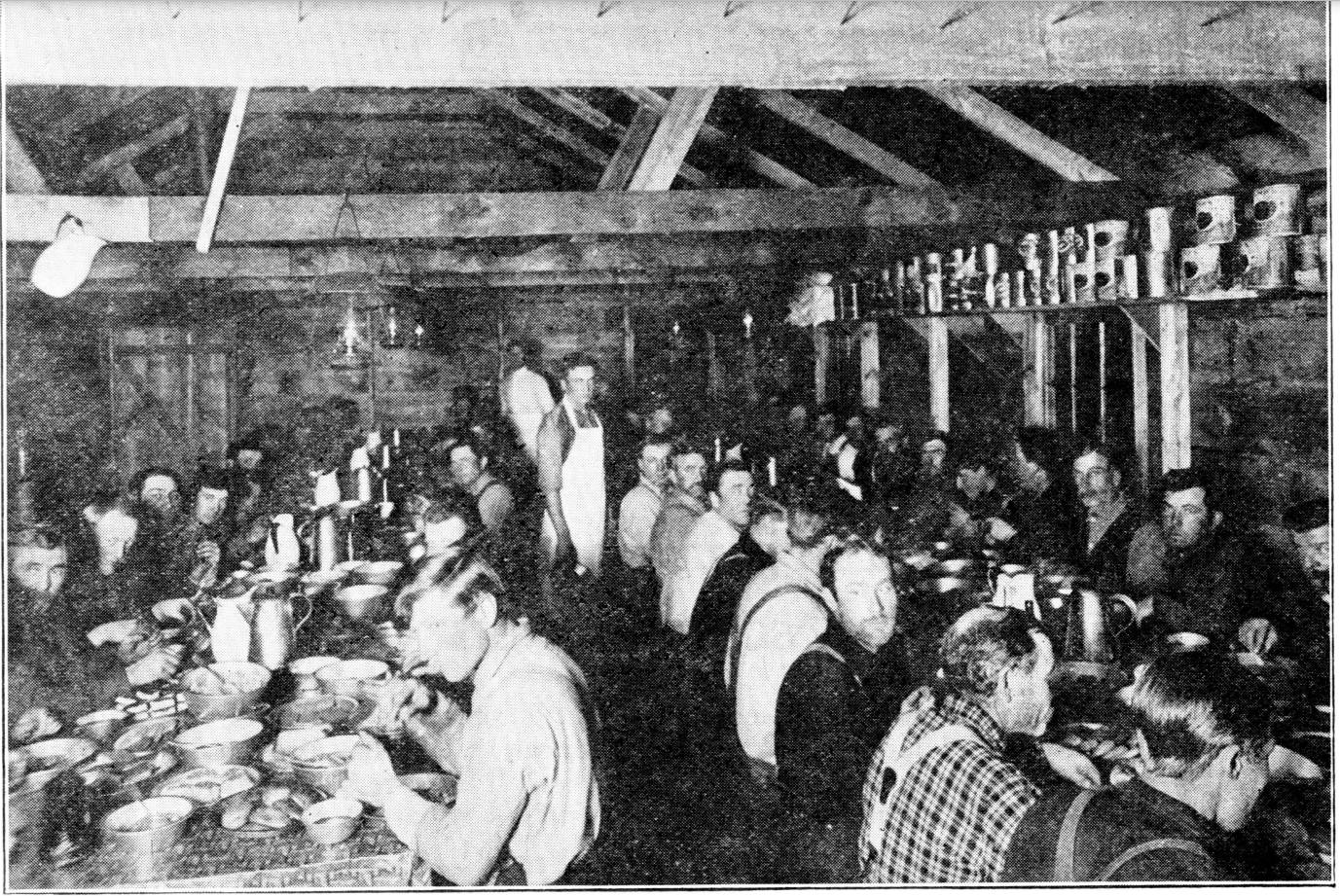
Lumberjacks in a logging camp dining hall in northern Minnesota, c. 1917

With the collapse of the miners' strike, many miners went to work in the area's lumber industry. Many lumber workers in the area also worked in mining during the summer months, and in late 1916, a significant number of lumberjacks had been involved in the miners' strike and were subsequently blacklisted by those companies. During their early years, the IWW had focused on organizing lumber workers primarily in the Western and Southern United States, and they had seen tremendous success in the Pacific Northwest, but they had only minor progress in organizing the industry in Minnesota and the larger Great Lakes region. However, starting in September 1916, Local 490 began to focus on organizing the 1,200 workers of the Virginia and Rainy Lake Lumber Company. The company was a concern, combining the Weyerhaeuser company's holdings in northern Minnesota, the Edward Hines Lumber Company's holdings in Minnesota and Wisconsin, and the Cook and O'Brien Company's processing facilities in Virginia. The Virginia plant was at the time the largest producer of white pine wood in the world, producing an average of 1 million board feet of lumber per day.

Mill workers were receptive to labor organizing due to the long hours and low pay they experienced on the job. At the Virginia plant, the mill workers' schedules included 12-hour days and 7-day weeks, with an average pay of between $2.50 and $3 per day (equivalent to between $74 and $89 in 2025). These workers made on average about 25 percent less than mill workers in the Pacific Northwest, which had already largely been organized by the IWW, and their hourly pay was significantly less than the average Virginia laborer's during this time. In an 84-hour week, the average Virginia and Rainy Lake mill worker made about what an average Virginia laborer earned in 50 to 54 hours of work, and many worked 6 days per week. While there had been several sporadic strikes and attempts at largescale labor organization among mill workers in the Great Lakes region since the late 1800s, such as efforts from the Knights of Labor, the region remained relatively unorganized and with lower pay than in other regions.

=== Organizing efforts among lumberjacks ===
As an industrial union—as opposed to a craft union—the IWW sought to organize all workers in the area's lumber industry, which would include both the mill workers and the lumberjacks. Lumberjacks in northern Minnesota worked in poor conditions and during their employment lived in company-owned bunkhouses on logging camps. The typical bunkhouse measured 80 feet (24 m) by 30 feet (9.1 m) in area and housed between 60 and 90 men. Lumberjacks shared beds in these close quarters, which were often lice-infested, and in 1914, investigators for Minnesota's Department of Labor reported that "the conditions under which the men were housed ... made it impossible for men to keep their bodies free from vermin". Additionally, the houses were poorly ventilated and insulated, toilet facilities at the camps were often extremely primitive, and there were no first aid facilities despite the high injury rate among lumberjacks. In 1914, two state investigators stated in a report after visiting a camp, "Both of us regretted that we did not have the authority to order all the men out of the camp and burn the place to the ground". Men worked six- or seven-day weeks at the camps, (Note: Sources vary between saying the lumberjacks worked six-day or seven-day weeks.) though their isolation from many nearby towns meant that they often remained at their camps even on their days off, and the typical lumber season lasted between 3 and 6 months. Many earned between $35 and $40 per month (equivalent to between $1,036 and $1,183 in 2025). These camps had an extremely high turnover rate, with the Virginia and Rainy Lake Lumber Company employing a total of 22,000 people in lumberjack positions in 1916, but only ever having about 2,000 employed at one time. The average worker left after 74 days, resulting in an entirely new crew about once every month for many camps. Additionally, lumberjacks were often looked down upon by town residents and other members of society, who derogatorily called them "timber beasts". Lumberjacks were drawn to the IWW as a way to improve both their working conditions and stance in society. In many of the towns in northern Minnesota, lumberjacks were welcomed in IWW halls, where they could sleep, socialize, and discuss organizing plans with others.

==== The Agricultural Workers Organization ====
In 1915, a new branch of the IWW was established: the Agricultural Workers Organization (AWO) No. 400. The AWO focused on organizing workers in the agricultural industry in the Midwestern United States, doing so by sending "job delegates" to work alongside other workers and introduce them covertly organize them. By 1916, due to a series of small-scale but effective strikes and an increase in demand for grain in Europe caused by World War I, the AWO successfully helped workers achieve higher wages, and their membership grew to about 20,000 by year's end. In late 1916, the AWO (which at the time was headquartered along Hennepin Avenue in Minneapolis) sent job delegates into the lumber camps in northern Minnesota. The IWW offices in Bemidji served as the AWO's local headquarters for these efforts, while other IWW offices in Duluth, Gemmell, Minneapolis, and Virginia also helped with the drive. The AWO planned for the organizing effort to last through 1917, at which point they felt they would have enough support among the lumberjacks to call for a strike.

=== Prelude to strike action ===
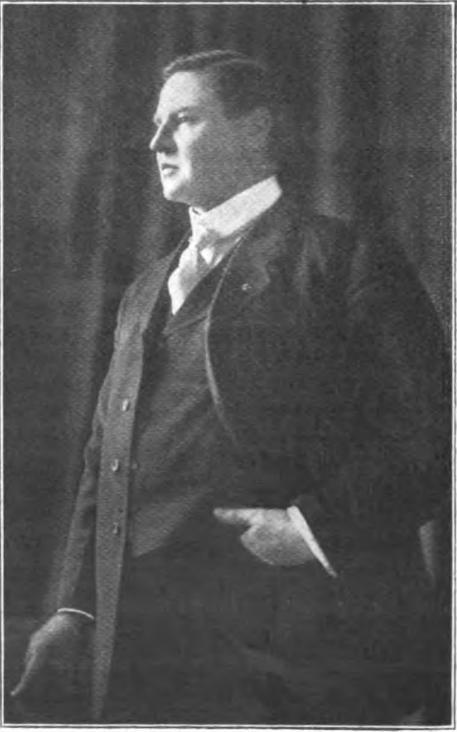
IWW General Secretary-Treasurer Bill Haywood (c. 1910) and other IWW officials were initially opposed to the lumber strike.

Through late 1916, IWW organizers discussed working conditions and organizing with millworkers and began to plan a strike action. One of the most vocal advocates for a strike was Jack "Timber Beast" Beaton, an IWW member and long-time lumberjack from Wisconsin. Beaton was a popular leading member of Local 490 due to his fiery oratory and militant stance on issues regarding strike action. This put him in disagreement with Jacobson and other IWW organizers, who were more cautious about the prospects of a strike. In December 1916, tensions between these two sides were exacerbated after five nationally known IWW organizers who had been arrested during the miners' strike on charges of murder were released as part of a deal that saw several rank and file union members charged with manslaughter. Some of the more militant unionists such as Beaton viewed the deal as a sellout by the IWW, and acting without direct approval from the national union, they began to prepare for a strike.

On December 24, several dozen organized millworkers met with Beaton at the Finnish Socialist Hall and drafted a list of demands to be submitted to the mill operators. The demands included a flat pay increase for all workers of 25 cents per day, eight-hour shifts on Sundays and Saturdays, an end to Sunday night shifts, shift changes every week, and an end to union suppression. The workers then elected a committee of six individuals to present these demands on December 26, with a deadline of noon on December 27. Jacobson was opposed to the idea and telegraphed IWW General Secretary-Treasurer Bill Haywood, who told Jacobson, "a successful strike at the present time in the Virginia mills would be hopeless. Must wait until better organized. Continue with organization work". Despite this, the meeting with mill management went as planned on December 26, and Jacobson reluctantly agreed to officially sanction the possible strike action. The demands were submitted to Chester R. Rogers, the manufacturing superintendent for the company, who rejected them. During their meeting, Beaton also stated that, if their demands were not met, lumberjacks would also go on strike in an act of solidarity, though Rogers dismissed that possibility. Shortly after the meeting, Rogers hired a large number of guards for the mill and requested St. Louis County Sheriff John R. Meining to deputize them, which he did. Additionally, Sheriff Meining deputized Rogers and placed him in charge of the guards.

As December 27 passed with no official response from the company by noon, the workers began to prepare for the strike. That night, Beaton oversaw a meeting of about 700 workers at the Finnish Socialist Hall, where a strike resolution was passed. At the same time, Beaton and Jacobson organized a "flying squad" of about a dozen men to go to the logging camps throughout the area to spread the word of the strike to the AWO job delegates and convince the lumberjacks to stop working as well. The IWW organizers had worked with individuals who were familiar with the conditions on the logging camps and had created a list of demands for the lumberjacks as well, which included no discrimination against union members, a 9-hour workday, a $10 per month pay increase (equivalent to $300 in 2025), a minimum wage of $40 per month (equivalent to $1,200 in 2025), negotiable salaries, better food, and improved sleeping, toilet, and cleaning facilities. Three lumberjacks from each camp were to submit these demands to the camp foreman. The demands from both the mill workers and the lumberjacks stipulated that both groups would remain on strike until both sets of demands were satisfied.

== Course of the strike ==
=== Early strike actions ===
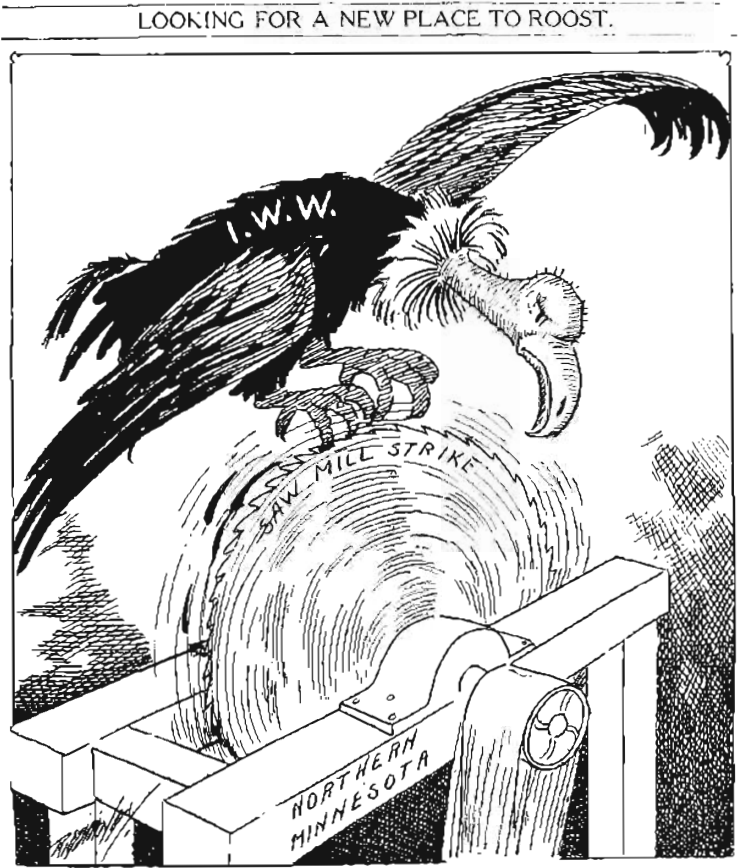
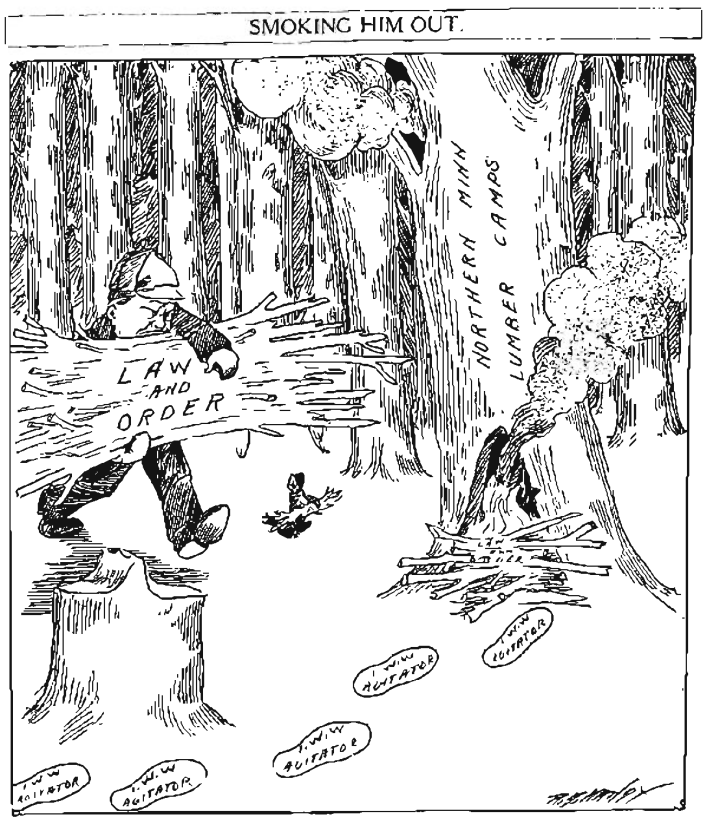
Anti-IWW political cartoons published by the Duluth News Tribune during the strike

On the morning of December 28, several hundred strikers began to picket outside the main gates to the Virginia and Rainy Lake Lumber Company plant in Virginia. The total number of workers on strike constituted a majority of the 1,200 workers and may have been as high as 1,000. As a result, one of the plant's two sawmills closed, while the other continued to operate only on a sporadic and reduced basis. That same day, men from the flying squad left Virginia en route to International Falls to attempt to recruit the lumberjacks, with many of the camps lying between these two cities along the logging railroads. Meanwhile, another group was sent from Bemidji to International Falls to recruit lumberjacks in the camps operated by the International Lumber Company. At the same time, Beaton left Virginia to go to Wisconsin, a state where he had previously done some work with labor organizing, where he hoped to recruit more lumberjacks to go on strike and possibly lead to a general strike of the lumber industry in the region.

The flying squads urged the lumberjacks to begin their strikes with a walkout on January 1, 1917. As the AWO organizers began to generate support for the strike, camp foremen notified company officials, who in turn notified sheriffs and requested deputies, though they were unable to send men before January 1. After several days of rallying support for the strike, on January 1, about 1,000 lumberjacks left their camps, with about 1,000 more joining the strike the following day and more throughout the rest of the week. Of the lumberjacks, over 1,000 came from 6 camps operated by the Virginia and Rainy Lake Lumber Company, while another 1,000 came from 9 camps operated by International Lumber. Exact figures regarding the total number of lumberjacks involved in the strike are difficult to substantiate, though the IWW reported at the time that about 4,000 were involved. The men boarded trains along the logging railroads and traveled to nearby towns, such as Bemidji, Gemmell, International Falls, and Virginia. Most of the affected camps were located in St. Louis and Koochiching Counties. In addition to the roughly 1,000 Virginia millworkers and 2,000 lumberjacks mentioned above, several smaller mills and independent logging operations, such as the Backus-Brooks Company, were affected by the strike, and International Lumber's sawmill in International Falls was hit by a partial walkout of millworkers. Both Virginia and Rainy Lake and International Lumber were forced to cease logging operations during the early days of the strike, and while the overall lumber industry in northern Minnesota was hard-hit, the industry in central Minnesota was relatively untroubled by the strike. Local newspapers were highly critical of the strike and the IWW in particular, with the Daily Virginian calling the Wobblies' actions a "reign of terrorism" and the Minneapolis Tribune reporting on alleged criminal acts committed by the Wobblies, such as well poisoning and crippling horses.

=== Law enforcement response to strike ===
During the early part of the strike, Rogers contacted other mills in the area and was able to gather enough replacement workers to keep one of his sawmills in operation for the duration of the strike. While the Virginia and Rainy Lake plant was located within Virginia city limits and therefore outside the jurisdiction of Rogers's deputies, the Virginia police department cooperated with Rogers and helped disperse large crowds of protesters away from the plant's gates. On the first day of the strike, picketing was pushed back to an area three city blocks away from the plant, and police arrested six picketers for distributing flyers. The next day, after police were notified by a court that there was no law against the distribution of flyers, the Virginia city council passed an ordinance banning the distribution of any flyer that had an "unsightly appearance". Over the next several days, police made many more arrests, including of six IWW leaders for disturbing the peace, intimidating strikebreakers, and distributing IWW literature. In one case, two of the men were given a $100 fine (equivalent to $2,500 in 2025) or 60 days of hard labor for disturbing the peace by using the word "scab". On January 1, 53 men were arrested at a camp near Cusson, Minnesota, for allegedly taking over a bunkhouse there, while a group of 40 picketers were arrested in mid-January for distributing flyers outside of the Virginia and Rainy Lake company's employment office in Duluth. Over the course of the strike, hundreds of people were deputized by the sheriffs of St. Louis, Koochiching, Beltrami, Carlton, and Itasca counties to prevent the strike from spreading. In many cases, these deputies were paid $2 per day (equivalent to $50 in 2025) by the sheriff's departments and another $3 per day (equivalent to $75 in 2025) by the lumber companies they were assisting, in addition to receiving room and board. In Koochiching County, public opinion against the lumber companies was so negative that the sheriff had to transport in people from the Minneapolis–Saint Paul metropolitan area to be deputized, which included two undercover spies from the IWW's Minneapolis office.

In Koochiching County, the sheriff led a raid on the IWW hall in Gemmell, arresting many of the leaders and telling the striking lumberjacks to either return to work or leave the town. While the leaders were released a week later due to a lack of charges against them, the raid had the effect of scattering the strikers and disrupting the strike in the county. Similar arrests of IWW leaders in other parts of the state further damaged the strike, and local municipalities began to pass laws specifically targeting the strikers and banning IWW members. In the mining city of Eveleth, the city government outright banned IWW members from the city, ordering all active members to leave or face arrest. On January 2, Virginia passed a similar law ordering all Wobblies to leave the city by 4 p.m. the next day or face arrest. Faced with the prospect of arrest, many lumberjacks in the city left that day, departing by train to either Duluth or Minneapolis–Saint Paul, with some others leaving Minnesota entirely. Of the remaining IWW members who stayed, many were arrested and given a choice between leaving the city or paying a $100 fine (equivalent to $2,500 in 2025), with many choosing the former. On January 4, Jacobson was arrested, and his successor was also arrested on January 15. The next day, Beaton was arrested in Park Falls, Wisconsin, on a concealed carry charge. At the state level, Minnesota Governor Joseph A. A. Burnquist sided with local law enforcement and the lumber companies by ordering that those arrested on charges of rioting during the strike be charged in Duluth instead of the city in which the offense allegedly took place. While many newspapers continued to write approvingly of the actions taken by law enforcement, the Saint Paul Dispatch was one of the only in the region to criticize the actions against the IWW as unconstitutional.

=== End of the strike ===
Within a week of the strike's beginning, several logging camps began to resume operations at a reduced output. Many strikers struggled to subsist off of the small strike pay offered by the IWW, and many began to find work elsewhere as the labor dispute continued. By the last week of January, many mill workers had returned to their jobs, and while lumberjacks held out longer, logging operations returned to prestrike levels by the beginning of February. On February 1, what was left of the IWW leadership in northern Minnesota met in Duluth and officially announced an end to the strike.

== Aftermath ==
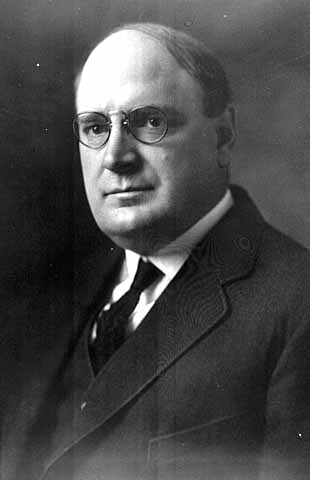
Following the strike, Minnesota Governor Joseph A. A. Burnquist (1922) signed into law a criminal syndicalism act that targeted the IWW.

Discussing the strike in a 1950 journal article, historian George B. Engberg calls it "one of the most serious strikes that the lumber industry of northern Minnesota has ever experienced". While the strike was primarily a failure for the IWW, Local 490 was able to claim a partial victory based on improved conditions for lumberjacks on logging camps. International Lumber bought new blankets for the bunkhouses and raised the base pay for lumberjacks slightly, while Virginia and Rainy Lake spent 20 percent more on food for the lumberjacks in the year following the strike. While the lumberjacks demanded a $40 per month minimum wage (equivalent to $1,010 in 2025), the companies instead instituted a $45 minimum monthly wage (equivalent to $1,130 in 2025). However, the IWW's presence on the Mesabi Range was all but destroyed by the strike as Local 490's operations were suppressed by law enforcement. Starting in January 1917, the Minnesota Legislature began to hold hearings regarding IWW activities in the state, inviting many mining and lumber industrialists, labor activists, and IWW leaders such as Joseph James Ettor to give testimony. According to academic Ahmed White in a 2022 book, these hearings showed that the IWW had not been engaged in violent activities in the time preceding the strike actions and exposed corruption and use of violence by the lumber and mining companies and local public officials. The report on the hearings also highlighted the poor working conditions experienced by the miners and lumberjacks, but offered little in the way of addressing these issues.

While the IWW had plans to launch another organizing drive among the mining and lumber industry in the area, the U.S. involvement in World War I soured these plans. In March 1917, a criminal syndicalism bill was proposed by a Minnesota senator from International Falls, and after passing both the Senate and House of Representatives with only one vote against in both chambers (both cast by Socialists), the bill was signed into law by Governor Burnquist in April. Minnesota was among a number of U.S. states and territories to pass criminal syndicalism laws that primarily targeted the IWW around this time, and in September 1917, Jesse Dunning, a former secretary of the IWW local office in Bemidji, became the first person in the United States to be convicted under such a law. That same month, agents from the United States Department of Justice launched several raids on IWW offices, including those in Duluth, Minneapolis, and other cities in the Mesabi Range, to gather evidence for use against the organization. Despite this, the IWW maintained a presence in the area into 1920, but by that time, their power had all but been broken. Additionally, during World War I, the Minnesota Public Safety Commission, a government commission established in 1917 with broad powers to ensure public safety during the war, had infiltrated the organization and succeeded in damaging it from the inside. Law enforcement agencies in the state later used similar techniques that they had applied to the IWW to target war dissenters and pacifists, as well as other left-leaning groups such as the Nonpartisan League. Throughout the 1920s and 1930s, organized labor activities in northern Minnesota was primarily driven by the affiliated unions of the American Federation of Labor and the Committee for Industrial Organization. Discussing the impact of the strike in a 1971 article, historian John E. Haynes wrote that, "The resolution of that strike helped redefine the boundaries of permissible political and economic dissent in Minnesota, virtually erased the specter of strong IWW influence on the iron range, and served as a precedent for the state's treatment of dissenters during World War I".

== Sources ==
- Chrislock, Carl H. (1991). Watchdog of Loyalty: The Minnesota Commission of Public Safety During World War I. Saint Paul, Minnesota: Minnesota Historical Society Press. ISBN 978-0-87351-263-3.
- Dubofsky, Melvyn (1969). "Miners, Lumberjacks, and a Reorganized IWW, 1916". We Shall Be All: A History of the Industrial Workers of the World. Chicago: Quadrangle Books. pp. 319–346. LCCN 75078306.
- Engberg, George B. (October 1950). "Collective Bargaining in the Lumber Industry of the Upper Great Lakes States". Agricultural History. 24 (4). Agricultural History Society: 205–211. ISSN 0002-1482. JSTOR 3740329.
- Foner, Philip S. (1965). History of the Labor Movement in the United States. Vol. IV: The Industrial Workers of the World, 1905–1917. New York City: International Publishers. LCCN 47019381.
- George, Harrison (February 1917). Kerr, Charles H. (ed.). "Hitting the Trail in the Lumber Camps" (PDF). International Socialist Review. XVII (8). Chicago: Charles H. Kerr & Co.: 455–457 – via Marxists Internet Archive.
- Haynes, John E. (Spring 1971). "Revolt of the 'Timber Beasts': IWW Lumber Strike in Minnesota" (PDF). Minnesota History. 42 (5). Minnesota Historical Society: 162–174. ISSN 0026-5497. JSTOR 20178120.
- LaVigne, David (May 4, 2021) [October 14, 2015]. "Mesabi Iron Range Strike, 1916". MNopedia. Minnesota Historical Society. Archived from the original on October 3, 2022.
- Millikan, William (2001). A Union Against Unions: The Minneapolis Citizens Alliance and Its Fight Against Organized Labor, 1903-1947. Saint Paul, Minnesota: Minnesota Historical Society Press. ISBN 978-0-87351-499-6.
- Reicher, Matt (November 25, 2019) [June 23, 2014]. "Minnesota Commission of Public Safety". MNopedia. Minnesota Historical Society. Archived from the original on January 22, 2023.
- White, Ahmed (2022). Under the Iron Heel: The Wobblies and the Capitalist War on Radical Workers. Berkeley, California: University of California Press. doi:10.1525/9780520382411. ISBN 978-0-520-38241-1. S2CID 252422713.
- Wingerd, Mary Lethert (2001). Claiming the City: Politics, Faith, and the Power of Place in St. Paul. Ithaca, New York: Cornell University Press. ISBN 978-0-8014-8885-6.
- Witek, Anja (September 17, 2016) [August 22, 2016]. "IWW Lumber Strike, 1916–1917". MNopedia. Minnesota Historical Society. Archived from the original on October 3, 2022.
