= Ahmed White =

American professor

- Born: September 5, 1970 (age 56); US
- Occupation: Professor of Law
- Years active: 1994-present

Academic background
- Education: Yale Law School

Academic work
- Notable works: The Last Great Strike (2016), Under the Iron Heel (2022)
- Website: https://law.wisc.edu

Ahmed White (born September 5, 1970) holds the James E. Jones Jr. Chair and is a Professor of Law at the University of Wisconsin-Madison Law School. His scholarship explores the intersection of labor and criminal law and on the concept of rule of law. He has written numerous academic articles and two books, The Last Great Strike, which details the history of the 1937 Little Steel Strike, and Under the Iron Heel, which is the first comprehensive account of the campaign of legal repression and vigilantism that effectively destroyed the Industrial Workers of the World.

== Background ==
Ahmed White was born on September 5, 1970. In 1991, he earned a BA summa cum laude in Political Science from Southern University and A&M. In 1994, he earned a JD from Yale Law School, where he served as essays editor for the Yale Law Journal.

== Career ==
White currently teaches at the University of Wisconsin Law School. In 2000, after spending three semesters as a visiting professor at Northwestern University Law School, White joined the faculty at the University of Colorado Law School as an assistant professor; he was the second African American hired on the tenure-track faculty there. In 2007, he was granted tenure and, in 2011, he was promoted to full professor. In 2016, he was named the Nicholas Rosenbaum Professor of Law. "The Nicholas Rosenbaum Professorship of Law was endowed by a gift from the estate of Nicholas Rosenbaum and is used to . . . attract and retain outstanding legal scholars." In 2024, White joined the faculty at the University of Wisconsin law school and was named the James E. Jones Jr. Chair. This Chair is "the most significant endowed position for UW Law School" and "UW’s first fully funded chair named in honor of an African American faculty member." The Chair focuses "on racial justice as well as labor and employment law."

== Works ==
Publications by White include:

Books

- The Last Great Strike: Little Steel, the CIO, and the Struggle for Labor Rights in New Deal America (2016)
- Under the Iron Heel: The Wobblies and the Capitalist War on Radical Workers (2022)

Articles

- "The Labor Movement and the Dilemma of Direct Confrontation," Employee Responsibilities & Rights Journal (March 2017)
- "We're Going to Run This City: Winnipeg's Political Left after the General Strike," Labor: Studies in Working Class History of the Americas (March 2017)
- "Free Markets, Unfree Labor," New Labor Forum (Fall 2017)
- "Its Own Dubious Battle: The Impossible Defense of an Effective Right to Strike," Wisconsin Law Review (2018)
- "The Crime of Radical Industrial Unionism," Employee Responsibilities & Rights Journal (December 2019)
- "Law, Labor, and the Hard Edge of Progressivism: The Legal Repression of Radical Unionism and the American Labor Movement's Long Decline," Berkeley Journal of Employment & Labor Law (2021)
- "Communists and Community: Activism in Detroit's Labor Movement, 1941-1956," Michigan Historical Review (Spring 2021)

=== The Last Great Strike ===
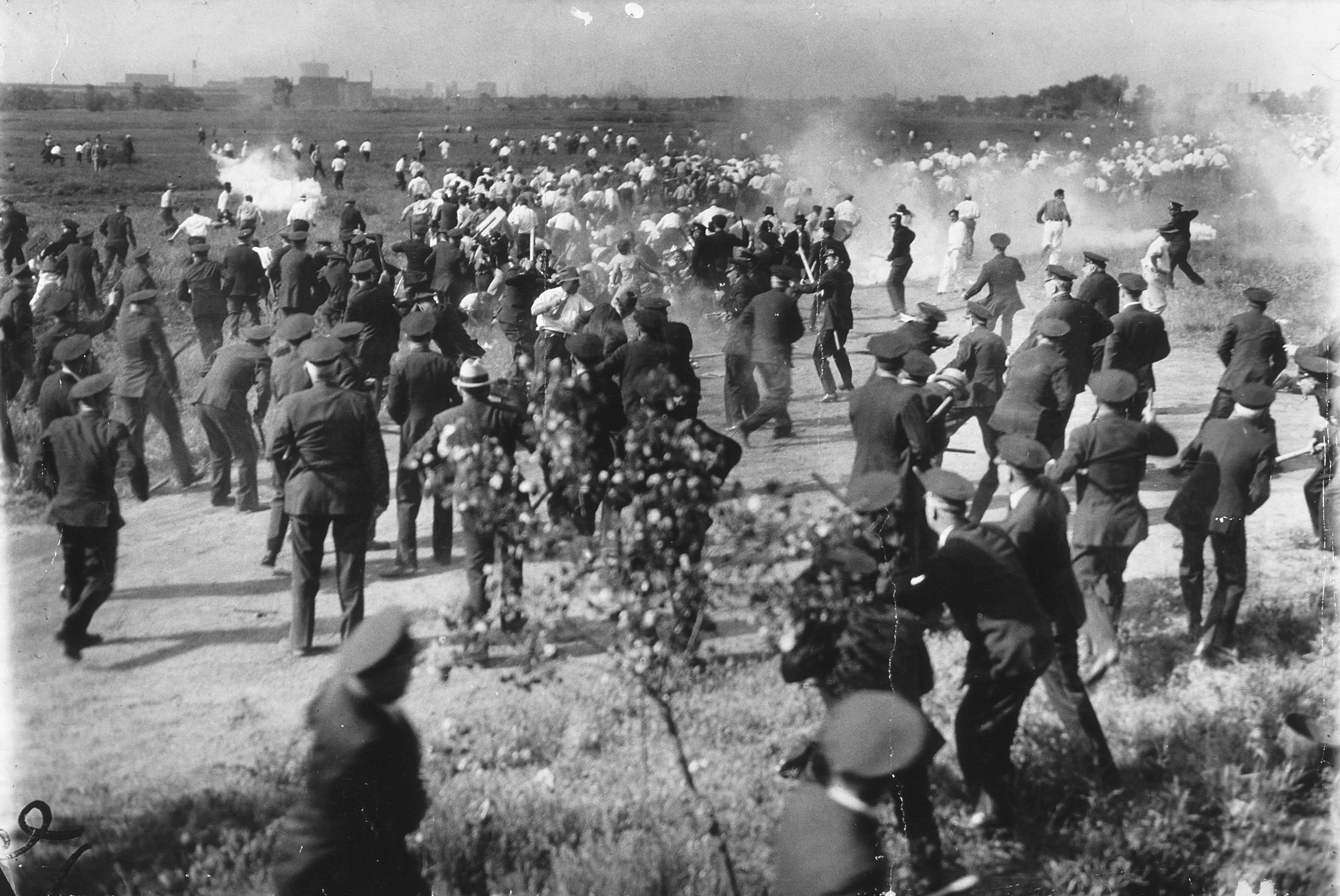
The Chicago Memorial Day Incident (AKA the 1937 Memorial Day massacre) features in White's The Last Great Strike

In January 2016, the University of California Press published White's first book, The Last Great Strike, which details the Little Steel Strike. It has received several reviews. Reviewer and historian Randi Storch describes the book as a "powerful read" that is "particularly relevant in today's 'post-truth' political environment." History News Network gives White "great credit" for engaging in a "reevaluation" of the Little Steel Strike and its impact, and says he "shines an overdue spotlight" on President Franklin D. Roosevelt's role in the episode. Professor Charles K. Piehl, of Minnesota State University, Mankato, writing for Library Journal, describes The Last Great Strike as the first book-length study of the well-known Little Steel Strike, and calls the book a "great read" with "wide appeal." Kevin Baker, author of (among other publications) The Big Crowd, calls The Last Great Strike "a brilliant, incisive, always intriguing, sometimes heartbreaking account of critical moment in America's labor history." Dale Maharidge, author of Journey to Nowhere, which inspired Bruce Springsteen's song, Youngstown, says the book is "a must-read for anyone interested in today's labor issues." And Steve Fraser, author of The Age of Acquiescence: The Life and Death of American Resistance to Organized Wealth and Power, calls the book "a superb piece of scholarship about a critical event in modern American labor history." The cover of The Last Great Strike features a detail of the painting, American Tragedy, by Philip Evergood, and is used courtesy of ACA Galleries in New York City. The painting depicts the 1937 Memorial Day Massacre in Chicago, Illinois.

=== Under The Iron Heel ===
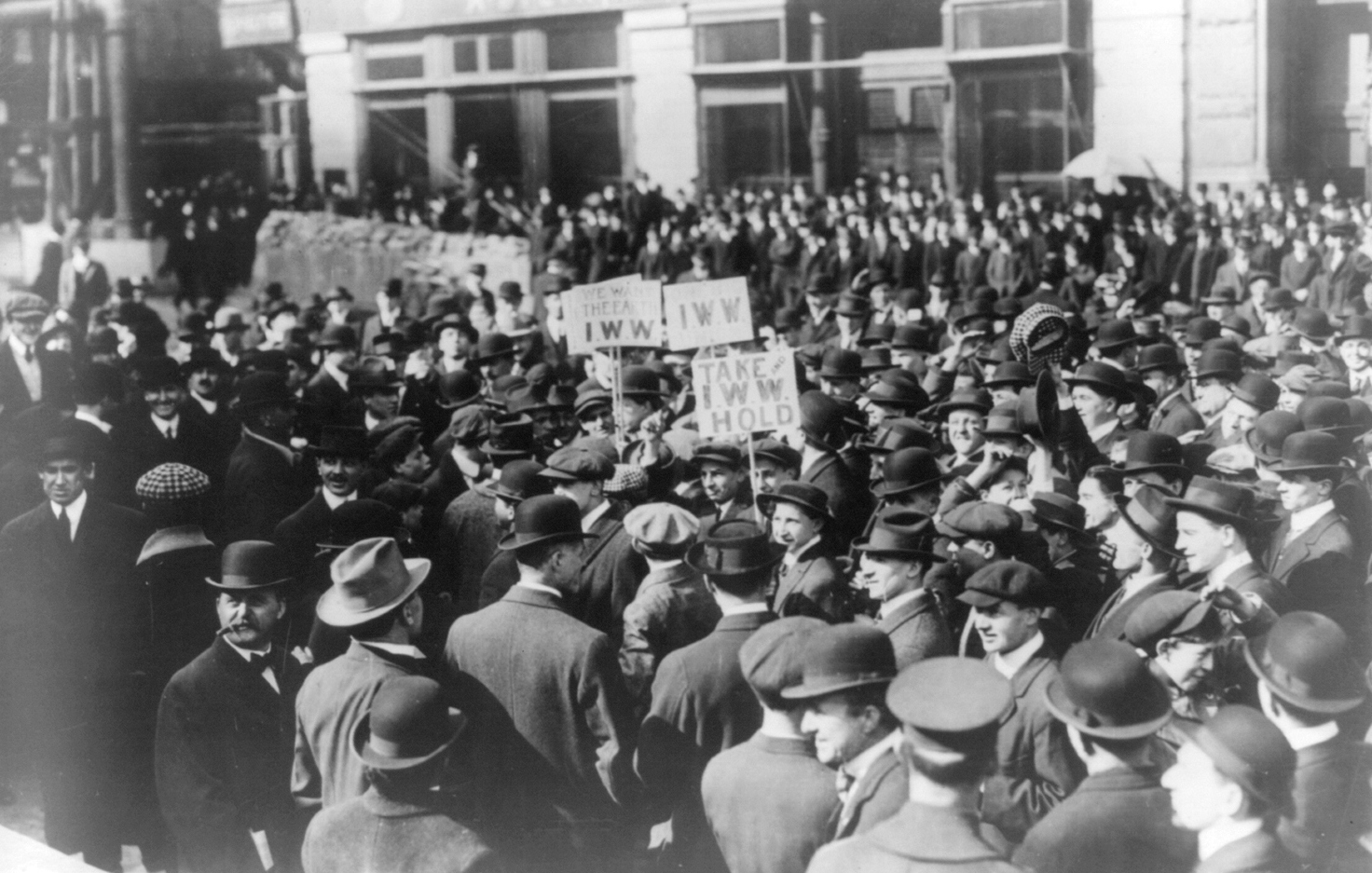
IWW demonstration in New York City in 1914, a recession year that saw dissension between Western Federation of Miners unionists and Anaconda Copper Mining Company owners

In October 2022, the University of California Press published White's second book, Under the Iron Heel, which documents the rise and fall of the Industrial Workers of the World or "IWW," whose members are often referred to as Wobblies. The book details the torrent of legal persecution and extralegal, sometimes lethal violence that shattered the IWW. In so doing, the book reveals the remarkable courage of those who faced this campaign, lays bare the origins of the profoundly unequal and conflicted nation we know today, and uncovers disturbing truths about the law, political repression, and the limits of free speech and association in class society.

== See also ==
- Little Steel strike
- Industrial Workers of the World
- Labor history of the United States
