= Valdo Turner =

American Physician

- Born: October 10, 1866; Dixon Springs, Tennessee, US
- Died: August 18, 1948 (aged 81); Nashville, Tennessee, US
- Resting place: Maplewood, Minnesota
- Education: Meharry Medical College
- Occupation: Physician
- Known for: Civil Rights activist
- Spouse: Lillian M. Anderson (m. 1896; div. 1918) Clara E. Howard (m. 1918)
- Children: 1

Valdo Turner (December 10, 1866 – August 18, 1948) was an American physician and civil rights activist. Turner was vice president of the St. Paul NAACP and captain of the Sixteenth Battalion Medical Corps, Minnesota Home Guard.

== Early life and education ==
Valdo Turner was born in Dixon Springs, Tennessee on December 10, 1866, to former slaves Pleasant and Caroline Turner. He had seven siblings. Growing up, Turner did farm labor with his parents. According to the 1880 census, by the age of 13, Turner could read but could not write. He 1898, he graduated from Meharry Medical College, a private historically black medical school.

== Career ==
By 1900, Turner established a medical practice located at 27 East Seventh Street, St. Paul.

In 1909, Turner became one of the founders of the NAACP organization in Minnesota, and nominated vice president of the St. Paul NAACP.

During his career, Turner performed abortions, which was illegal at the time. In 1910, he was charged for performing an abortion and was defended in court by Frederick McGhee, who was an African American criminal defense lawyer, and also part of the civil rights movement. In 1912, Turner worked with McGhee to establish the Twin City Protective League, which later joined forced with the NAACP. On April 26, 1918, Turner headed the medical corps of Military companies C and D formed in Minneapolis for the state's National Guard.

Throughout his years, Turner participated in fraternal, civic, and civil rights organizations. In 1928, Turner was again charged with performing illegal abortions. This time, the judge ordered him to leave the state, at which point Turner relocated to Nashville, Tennessee.

Turner continued his work as a physician in Nashville until his death in 1948.

== Personal life ==
On June 6, 1896, Turner married American educator and civil rights activist Lillian M. Anderson. By 1900, the couple relocated to St. Paul, Minnesota. They divorced in 1918. The same year, he married Clara E. Howard, who was 18 years his junior. On December 4, 1919, they had their only child, Valdora.

He died in Nashville on August 18, 1948. Cause of death was attributed to kidney and heart disease. He was buried in Maplewood, Minnesota.
