= 1918 Tyler tornado =

1918 tornado in Minnesota, U.S.

Meteorological history
- Formed: August 21, 1918, 9:20 p.m. CST (UTC−06:00)
- Dissipated: August 21, 1918, 11:25 p.m. CST (UTC−06:00)
- Duration: 2 hours, 5 minutes

F4 tornado
- on the Fujita scale
- Highest winds: 207–260 mph (333–418 km/h)

Overall effects
- Casualties: 36 fatalities, 100 injuries

The 1918 Tyler tornado was a deadly and destructive tornado that devastated the town of Tyler, Minnesota on Wednesday, August 21, 1918. The F4-estimated tornado hit the town at approximately 9:20 pm, killing 36 people and injuring over 100 others. Debris from Tyler was found up to 23 miles (37 km) away. It is the fourth-deadliest tornado in Minnesota's history.

== See also ==
- Climate of Minnesota
- List of North American tornadoes and tornado outbreaks
- 1919 Fergus Falls tornado
