= MNopedia =

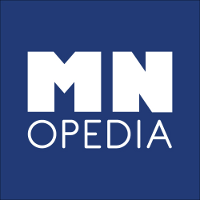
- Website type: Internet encyclopedia project
- Available in: English
- Website: www.mnhs.org/mnopedia
- Launched: August 15, 2011; 15 years ago
- Content license: CC BY-SA 3.0; Public domain; All rights reserved

MNopedia: The Minnesota Encyclopedia is a free English-language encyclopedia project from the Minnesota Historical Society. Funded through a Legacy Amendment Arts and Cultural Heritage Fund grant, it is the first online encyclopedia about Minnesota, a "resource for reliable information about significant people, places, events, and things in Minnesota history". Approved by Minnesotans on November 4, 2008, planning took place in 2010, the site was built in 2011 and was online on August 15; initial funding for 2010 was $199,457. Many of the articles produced by the encyclopedia are licensed under a Creative Commons Attribution-ShareAlike 3.0 Unported License as are some of its multimedia files.

The Minnesota Historical Society had previously planned to produce a print encyclopedia, but opted for an online site for the sake of affordability and interactivity. MNHS paid history scholars including Rhoda Gilman and Annette Atkins to compose essays for the site and the historical society also awards grants for the creation of entries on select topics.

MNopedia is queryable via API. Online newspaper MinnPost publishes entries from MNopedia on a weekly basis as well as publishing bimonthly news articles that are later developed into entries for MNopedia.

Linda Cameron is the Project Manager. The article on the Wealthy Apple is a staff and internet favorite; under CC-By-SA attribution it was imported from MNopedia into Wikipedia in 2012.
