= John F. McGee =

American judge (1861–1925)

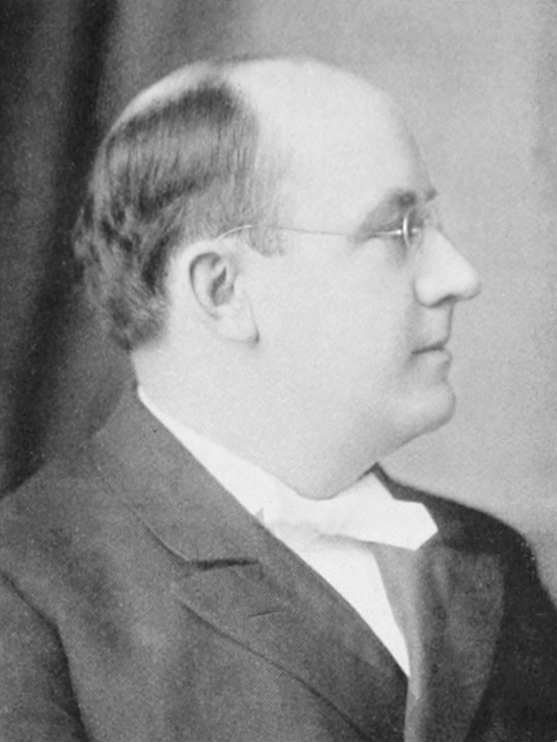

Judge of the United States District Court for the District of Minnesota
- In office March 2, 1923 – February 15, 1925
- Appointed by: Warren G. Harding
- Preceded by: Seat established by 42 Stat. 837
- Succeeded by: Seat abolished

Personal details
- Born: John Franklin McGee; January 1, 1861 Amboy, Illinois
- Died: February 15, 1925 (aged 64) Minneapolis, Minnesota
- Education: read law

John Franklin McGee (January 1, 1861 – February 15, 1925) was a United States district judge of the United States District Court for the District of Minnesota.

== Education and career ==
Born in Amboy, Illinois, McGee read law to enter the bar in 1882. He was in private practice in Devils Lake, Dakota Territory (now North Dakota) from 1883 to 1887, and in Minneapolis, Minnesota from 1887 to 1897. He was a judge of the Fourth Judicial District of Minnesota from 1897 to 1902, thereafter returning to private practice in Minneapolis until 1923.

In 1917, when the United States entered World War I, McGee was appointed by Minnesota Governor Joseph A.A. Burnquist to chair the Minnesota Commission of Public Safety. The Commission mobilized resources to support the American war effort. Under McGee, the Commission harassed labor organizers and sought to suppress labor agitation. McGee testified before congress regarding antiwar activity in Minnesota, accusing the German American and Swedish American communities in Minnesota of fostering sedition. McGee advocated for the use of firing squads to execute alleged traitors for undermining the war effort.

== Federal judicial service ==
On February 28, 1923, McGee was nominated by President Warren G. Harding to a new seat on the United States District Court for the District of Minnesota created by 42 Stat. 837. He was confirmed by the United States Senate on March 2, 1923, and received his commission the same day. McGee served in that capacity until February 15, 1925, when he committed suicide with a revolver in his chambers. He left a note stating that he was suffering exhaustion and depression due to his heavy workload. His seat was abolished upon his death as it had been established as a temporary judgeship.

== Sources ==
Legal offices
Preceded by Seat established by 42 Stat. 837	Judge of the United States District Court for the District of Minnesota; 1923–1925	Succeeded by Seat abolished
