= List of US strikes by size =

Number of workers	Strike	Date	Place
4,300,000–5,000,000	Strike wave of 1945–46	1945–46	stbernards
4,000,000	Strike wave of 1919	1919	nationwide
750,000–800,000	1946 Steel Strike	1946	nationwide
675,000	1983 AT&T strike	1983	nationwide
610,000	1922 UMW General coal strike	1922	world wid
560,000	1952 steel strike	1952	nationwide
540,000	1971 Rail strike	1971	nationwide
519,000	Steel strike of 1959	1959	nationwide
500,000	1956 steel strike	1956	nationwide
500,000	1949 steel strike	1949	naionwide
459,000	1967 US Railroad strike	1967	nationwide
440,000	1971 Telephone strike	1971	nationwide
400,000	1970 General Motors Strike	1970	nationwide
400,000	Textile workers' strike (1934)	1934	New England, Mid-Atlantic region and U.S. southern states
400,000	Great Railroad Strike of 1922	1922	nationwide
400,000	1955 Steel strike	1955	nationwide
400,000	1949 US coal strike	1949	nationwide
400,000	1946 UMW mine strike	1946	nationwide
400,000	1935 US Bituminous Coal Strike	1935	nationwide
394,000	1919 UMW Coal strike	1919	nationwide
370,000	Telephone Strike	1947	nationwide
365,000	Steel strike of 1919	1919	nationwide
360,000	1943 Bituminous coal strike	1943	nationwide
343,000	1947 Bituminous coal strike	1947	nationwide
330,000	1939 US Bituminous coal strike	1939	nationwide
321,000	1978 Railroad strike	1978	nationwide
320,000	United Auto Workers strike of 1945–1946	1945	nationwide
320,000	1948 US Bituminous coal strike	1948	nationwide
300,000	1958 General Motors strike	1958	nationwide
275,000	1964 General Motors strike	1964	nationwide
270,000	1952 Bituminous coal strike	1952	nationwide
257,000	1969 Telephone strike	1969	nationwide
250,000	Pullman Strike	1894	Originally Pullman, Chicago, spread nationwide
250,000	1946 Rail Strike	1946	nationwide
249,300	1976 Truckers strike	1976	nationwide
239,000	1961 General Motors Strike	1961	nationwide
219,400	1979 Truckers strike	1979	nationwide
+205,207	Bituminous coal miners' strike	1894	nationwide
+200,000	Great Southwest railroad strike	1886	nationwide
200,000	U.S. Postal Service strike of 1970	1970	nationwide
200,000	1927 Indiana bituminous strike	1927	nationwide
193,000	1967 US truckers strike	1967	nationwide
185,000	1997 UPS Strike	1997	nationwide
180,000	Bituminous coal miners' strike of 1894	1894	nationwide
175,000	1950 US Rail strike	1950	nationwide
174,000	1946 United Electrical GE strike	1946	nationwide
166,300	1976 Ford motor strike	1976	nationwide
164,000	1969–1970 General Electric strike	1969-70	nationwide
160,000	Bituminous Coal Strike of 1977–1978	1977–78	nationwide
160,000	1955 General Motors strike	1955	nationwide
160,000	2023 SAG-AFTRA strike	2023	nationwide (primarily Los Angeles and New York City)
159,000	1967 Ford Motors strike	1967	nationwide
152,000 idled	1998 General Motors strike	1998	Flint, Michigan
150,000	1952 Telephone strike	1952	nationwide
145,000	1980 California construction strikes	1980	California
142,000	1946 Licensed personal maritime strike	1946	nationwide
+136,000	Flint sit-down strike	1936	Flint, Michigan
136,000	1996 General Motors Strike	1996	Dayton, OH
135,000	2000 commercial actors strike	2000	Hollywood
134,400	1943 steelworkers strike	1943	Northeastern United States
132,000	1946 Unlicensed personal maritime strike	1946	nationwide
130,000	1900 Anthracite coal strike	1900	Eastern Pennsylvania
125,000	1957 Western Electric strike	1957	nationwide
120,000	Bituminous Coal Strike of 1974	1974	nationwide
116,000	1966 rail strike	1966	
116,000	1961 Ford Motors strike	1961	nationwide
111,400	1973 Chrysler strike	1973	nationwide
110,100	1976 Bituminous coal strike	1976	
110,000	1970 US truckers strike	1970	nationwide
110,000	2018–2019 education workers' strikes	2018–2019	nationwide
105,000	1971 Bituminous coal strike	1971	
105,000	1958 Dress workers strike	1958	New England
102,000	2004 SBC Communications workers strike	2004	nationwide
+100,000	Great Railroad Strike	1877	nationwide
+100,000	1902 Anthracite coal strike	1902	Pennsylvania
100,000's	1918-20 New York City rent strikes	1918-20	New York City
100,000	1947 Iowa one-day general strike	1947	Iowa
100,000	1872 New York City Eight Hour Day Strike	1872	New York City
100,000	1973 Chicago construction strike	1973	Chicago, IL
95,000	1950 Chrysler strike	1950	-
90,000	1952 Oil workers strike	1952	nationwide
85,700	1974 US textile workers strike	1974	nationwide
85,000	Verizon Strike	2000	nationwide
83,000	1948 US Meatpacking strike	1948	nationwide
80,000 (~)	1994 US truckers strike	1994	nationwide
80,000	1950 Western Electric strike	1950	nationwide
78,000	1955 Ford Motor strike	1955	nationwide
75,000	2023 Kaiser Permanente healthcare workers strike	2023	
75,000	1946 Westinghouse Electric strike	1946	Pittsburgh
75,000	1948 Chrysler strike	1948	Midwestern United States
75,000	1958 Ford Motor strike	1958	
73,000	1973 Pennsylvania Central Transportation strike	1973	Northeastern United States
73,000	1998 Bell Atlantic strike	1998	nationwide
73,000	1961 Airline strike	1961	nationwide
73,000	1943 Pennsylvania Anthracite coal strike	1943	Eastern Pennsylvania
70,000	1972 Chicago builders strike	1972	Chicago
70,000	Southern California supermarket strike of 2003–2004	2003–2004	Southern California
70,000	1951 rail strike	1951	nationwide
73,000	2007 General Motors strike	2007	Detroit, Michigan
72,000	1960 Pennsylvania Railroad Co. strike	1960	
68,000-85,000	New England Textile Strike	1922	Northeast
+67,000	Little Steel strike	1937	nationwide
67,000	1980 actors strike	1980	nationwide (primarily Hollywood)
66,000	1968 Bituminous coal strike	1968	
65,000	1971 Northern and Central California construction strikes	1971	California
64,100	1974 Western Electric strike	1974	
63,000	1975 New York City teachers strike	1975	New York City
63,000	1960 General Electric strike	1960	nationwide
63,100	1980 Petroleum strike	1980	nationwide
62,000	1949 Ford Motor Michigan strike	1949	Michigan
61,900	1975 Bituminous coal strike	1975	
60,000	1953 California construction strike	1953	Northern and Central California
60,000	1956 East & Gulf Coast longshoremen strike	1956	East & Gulf Coast
59,000	1969 UMW coal strike	1969	
56,200	1976 Rubber workers strike	1976	nationwide
56,000	1958 Chrysler strike	1958	
55,000	1978 Southern California retail clerks strike	1978	Southern California
54,800	1944 Detroit Foremen's Strike	1944	Detroit, Michigan
53,940 (~)	New York City Teacher's Strike of 1968	1968	New York City
52,700	1975 AFSCME Pennsylvania strike	1975	Pennsylvania
52,000	1950 International Harvester strike	1950	
52,000	1959 East & Gulf Coast longshoremen strike	1959	East & Gulf Coast
+50,000	Clockmakers' strike	1910	New York City
50,000	1962 East & Gulf Coast longshoremen strike	1962	East & Gulf Coast
50,000	1970 Southern California construction strike	1970	Southern California
50,000	1974 Southern California construction strike	1974	Southern California
50,000	1980 Southern California construction strike	1980	Southern California
50,000	1968 Michigan construction strike	1968	Michigan
50,000	1967 Rubber workers strike	1967	
50,000	1947 Shipyard strike	1947	nationwide
50,000	1946 Oakland general strike	1946	Oakland, California
50,000	1953 Telephone strike	1953	
50,000	1972 Minneapolis construction contractors strike	1972	Minneapolis and surrounding areas
50,000 idled	SS California strike	1936	San Pedro, California
49,800	2023 United Auto Workers strike	2023	nationwide
49,000	1969 Oil workers strike	1969	
48,000	2022 University of California academic workers' strike	2022	California
48,000	1951 Woolen workers strike	1951	East Coast
48,000	2018 University of California Medical Centers Strike	2018	California
48,000	2019 General Motors strike	2019	nationwide
47,300	1979 United Airlines strike	1979	nationwide
47,000	2000 L.A. County Workers Strike	2000	California
47,000	1967 New York City teachers strike	1967	New York City
47,000	1956 US Glass strike	1956	
46,000	1968 East & Gulf Coast Stevedoring strike	1968	East & Gulf Coast
46,000	2011 Verizon Strike	2011	nationwide
45,800	1969 Bituminous coal strike	1969	
45,000	1974 Northwest contractors strikes	1974	Northwestern United States
45,000	1929 New York City Garment Strike	1929	New York City
45,000	1952 Westcoast lumber strike	1952	West Coast of the United States
44,000-60,000	1945 Pacific Northwest lumber strike	1945	Pacific Northwest
44,000	1955–1956 Westinghouse strike	1955–1956	
44,000	November 1967 General Motors strike	1967	Pontiac, Michigan
43,000	1971 International Harvester strike	1971	nationwide
41,000	1910 Chicago garment workers' strike	1910–1911	Chicago
40,400	1979 Caterpillar strike	1979	
40,000	1951 Cotton workers strike	1951	Southern United States
40,000	1955 International Harvester strike	1955	
40,000	1965 Glassblower strike	1965	
40,000	1966 UMW coal strike	1966	
40,000	2016 Verizon workers' strike	2016	East Coast
37,100	1979 Westinghouse Electric strike	1979	
36,000	1973 Caterpillar strike	1973	nationwide
35,000	1934 West Coast waterfront strike	1934	U.S. West Coast
35,000	International Harvester strike of 1979–1980	1979-80	
33,000	1966 New York City transit strike	1966	New York City
33,000	1995 Boeing Strike	1995	Washington State (Everett/Seattle/Renton)
32,000 - 34,000	2005 New York City transit strike	2005	New York City
31,000	2019 Stop & Shop strike	2019	Massachusetts, Rhode Island and Connecticut
31,000	1946 New York City truckers strike	1946	New York City & New Jersey
30,000–35,000	1938 New York City truckers strike	1938	New York City & New Jersey
30,000	1952 Packinghouse workers strike	1952	
30,000	Illinois Central shopmen's strike of 1911	1911	Illinois, Mississippi and Texas
30,000	2019 Los Angeles Unified School District teachers' strike	2019	Los Angeles County, California
30,000	1928 New Bedford textile strike	1928	New Bedford, Massachusetts
30,000	1935 Pacific Northwest lumber strike	1935	Pacific Northwest
30,000	1912 Lawrence textile strike or "Bread and Roses" strike	1912	Lawrence, Massachusetts
27,000	Boeing Machinists Strike of 2008	2008	Seattle, Washington
26,000	1967 Caterpillar strike	1967	Colorado, Illinois, Iowa, Ohio and Pennsylvania
+25,700	Florida statewide teachers' strike of 1968	1968	Florida
25,000 - 60,000	Anti-Rent War and strikes	1839-45	Hudson Valley, Upstate New York
24,000	1951 Caterpillar strike	1951	East Peoria, Illinois
23,000	1973 Chicago teachers strike	1973	Chicago
20,000	1948 Caterpillar strike	1948	Peoria, Illinois
+20,000	1982 garment workers' strike	1982	New York City
20,000	2019 AT&T strike	2019	Southern United States
20,000	Philadelphia General Strike	1835	Philadelphia
20,000	New England Shoemakers Strike of 1860	1860	Lynn, Massachusetts
20,000-30,000	New York shirtwaist strike of 1909	1909	Manhattan, New York
19,000	1985 Pan Am strike	1985	nationwide
17,000	1962 New York City newspaper strike	1962	New York City
16,000	1973 Philadelphia teachers strike	1973	Philadelphia
16,000	Santa Clara cannery strike	1931	Santa Clara, California
15,000-16,000	1919 NYC Harbor Strike	1919	New York City
15,000	1836 Mill Women's Strike (Lowell, Massachusetts)	1836	Lowell, Massachusetts
15,000	Westmoreland County coal strike of 1910–1911	1910–1911	Westmoreland County, Pennsylvania
15,000	1920 Alabama coal strike	1920	Alabama
15,000	1957 Long Island strike	1957	Long Island, New York
15,000	Boeing Strike of 1948	1948	Seattle, Washington
15,000	1926 Passaic textile strike	1926	Passaic, New Jersey
15,000	1835 New England Mill Strike	1835	New England
15,000	2026 New York City nurses strike	2026	New York City
14,000	Copper Country strike of 1913–1914	1913–1914	Upper Michigan
14,000	1994 Caterpillar strike	1994	Illinois, Pennsylvania and Colorado
14,000	Bay View massacre	1886	Milwaukee, Wisconsin
13,000	Air traffic controllers' strike	1981	nationwide
12,600	1973 Detroit teachers strike	1973	Detroit
+12,000	Tampa cigar makers' strike of 1910–11	1910–1911	Tampa, Florida
12,000	1938 San Antonio pecan shellers strike	1938	San Antonio
12,000 minimum	Tool and die strike of 1939	1939	Detroit, Michigan
12,000	1951 Aliquippa steelworkers strike	1951	Aliquippa, Pennsylvania
12,000	Colorado Coalfield War	1913	Ludlow, Colorado
12,000	Longshore Strike (1971, U.S.)	1971	U.S. West Coast Hawaii and British Columbia
12,000	2007–2008 Writers Guild of America strike	2007–2008	Hollywood, California
12,000	1973 Cleveland teachers strike	1973	Cleveland
12,000	September 1967 General Motors strike	1967	Dayton, Ohio
11,600	2021 Washington state carpenters strike	2021	Washington
11,500	2023 Writers Guild of America strike	2023	nationwide (primarily Los Angeles and New York City)
10,000-14,000	1933 Detroit auto strike	1933	Detroit, Michigan
10,500	Hollywood Black Friday	1945	Hollywood, California
10,000 at least	Auto-Lite strike	1934	Toledo, Ohio
10,000-30,000	1917 Twin Cities streetcar strike	1917	Minneapolis–Saint Paul, Minnesota
+10,000	Delano grape strike	1965–70	Delano, California
10,000	1907 San Francisco streetcar strike	1907	San Francisco, California
10,000	2021 John Deere strike	2021	Nationwide
10,000	Goodyear strike	1948	Akron, Ohio
10,000	Pacific Northwest lumber strike	1935	U.S. Pacific Northwest
10,000	1907 New York City rent strike	1907	New York City
10,000	Cigar makers' strike of 1877	1877–1878	New York City
10,000 idle	1978 New York City newspaper strike	1978	New York City
10,000	Thibodaux massacre (Sugar cane workers' strike)	1887	Lafourche Parish, Louisiana
10,000	Battle of Blair Mountain	1921	Logan County, West Virginia
9,000	1988 Writers Guild of America strike	1988	Hollywood, California
9,000	2023 Rutgers University strike	2023	New Jersey
8,500	1981 Writers Guild of America strike	1981	Hollywood, California
+8,400	Colorado Coal Strike	1927	Serene, Colorado
8,000	Tampa cigar makers' strike of 1931	1931	Tampa, Florida
8,000	1923 San Pedro maritime strike	1923	San Pedro, Los Angeles, California
8,000	Pressed Steel Car strike of 1909	1909	McKees Rocks, Pennsylvania
7,700	Marriott Hotels strike	2018	Bethesda, Maryland
7,500	Coal miners' strike of 1873	1873	Northeastern Ohio, Northwestern Pennsylvania
7,500	1935 Gulf Coast longshoremen's strike	1935	U.S. Gulf Coast
7,100	1953 Milwaukee brewery strike	1953	Milwaukee
7,000	1949 New York City brewery strike	1949	New York City
7,000	Tompkins Square Riot	1874	New York City
6,500	1912 New York City waiters' strike	1912	New York City
6,500	Homestead strike	1892	Homestead, Pennsylvania
6,550	2015 United Steel Workers Oil Refinery Strike	2015	California, Indiana, Kentucky, Ohio, Texas and Washington
+6,000	Remington Rand strike of 1936–1937	1936–37	New York City
+6,000	US Maritime Strike of 1921	1921	nationwide
+6,000	1911 Grand Rapids furniture workers strike	1911	Grand Rapids, Michigan
6,000	Salad Bowl strike	1970–71	nationwide
5,800	Harlan County War	1931	Harlan County, Kentucky
5,000	Newsboys Strike	1899	New York, New York
5,000	Ford Hunger March	1932	Detroit, Michigan
5,000	Imperial Valley lettuce strike of 1930	1930	Imperial Valley, California
+4,500	Philadelphia Transit Strike	1944	Philadelphia, Pennsylvania
4,500	2022 Minneapolis teacher's strike	2022	Minneapolis
4,300	2020 Bath shipbuilders strike	2020	Bath, Maine
4,000 - 5,000	1937 Lewiston–Auburn shoe strike	1937	Lewiston, Maine and Auburn, Maine
4,000	Chrysler wildcat strike	1968	Detroit, Michigan
+4,000	Southern California drywall strike	1992	Southern California
3,700	2023 Portland Association of Teachers strike	2023	Portland, Oregon
3,500	Coeur d'Alene labor strike	1892	Coeur d'Alene, Idaho
3,200	2025 Boeing machinists' strike	2025	Greater St. Louis, Missouri/Illinois
3,000	St. Louis streetcar strike of 1900	1900	St. Louis, Missouri
3,000	Chinese Labor Strike of 1867	1867	Sierra Nevada, California
3,000	Guilford Transportation Industries railroad workers' strike	1986	North Billerica, Massachusetts
3,000	2021 Columbia University strike	2021	New York City
3,000	1881 Atlanta washerwomen strike	1881	Atlanta
2,900	2021 Virginia Volvo Trucks strike	2021	Dublin, Virginia
2,600	San Francisco newspaper strike of 1994	1994	San Francisco, California
2,500	Detroit Newspaper Strike	1995–97	Detroit, Michigan
2,400	National Union Healthcare Workers (NUHW) against Kaiser Permanente	2024-25	Southern California
2,300	2015 Kohler Strike	2015	Kohler, Wisconsin
2,250	Leadville miners' strike	1896	Leadville, Colorado
2,200	2021 New York University strike	2021	New York City
+2,300	Arizona Copper Mine Strike of 1983	1983	Greenlee County, Arizona
2,100	Boston cigar makers' strike of 1919	1919	Boston
2,100	2020 Michigan graduate students strike	2020	Ann Arbor, Michigan
2,000	2021 Mercy Hospital strike	2021	Buffalo, New York
2,000 (~)	1835 Paterson textile strike	1835	Paterson, New Jersey
+2,000	Puget Sound fishermen's strike of 1949	1949	Puget Sound, Washington
+2,000	Pittston Coal strike	1989–90	Pittston, Pennsylvania
2,000	1904 New York City Rent Strike	1904	New York City
1,000s	2010 Georgia prison strike	2010	Georgia
1,000s	1945–1946 Charleston Cigar Factory strike	1945–46	Charleston, South Carolina
1,000s	Bayonne refinery strikes	1915–16	Bayonne, New Jersey
1,850 (~)	Paterson silk strike	1913	Paterson, New Jersey
1,800	Loray Mill strike	1929	Gastonia, North Carolina
1,700	1973 New York City gravediggers' strike	1973	New York City
1,500	1977–78 Coors strike	1977–78	Golden, Colorado
1,500	Atlanta transit strike of 1950	1950	Atlanta
1,500	1985–86 Hormel strike	1985–86	Austin, Minnesota
1,400	2021 Kellogg's strike	2021	Nationwide
1,400	2021 Hunts Point Produce Market strike	2021	New York City
1,325	2003 Broadway Musicians Strike	2003	New York City
1,300	Memphis sanitation strike	1968	Memphis, Tennessee
1,300	2021 Allegheny Technologies strike	2021	Northern United States
1,300	1977 Atlanta sanitation strike	1977	Atlanta
+1,200	Oxnard strike of 1903	1903	Oxnard, California
1,200	International Paper strike	1987	Corinth, New York
1,100	Tacoma nurses strike 2014	2014	Tacoma and Lakewood, Washington
1,100	2021–2023 Warrior Met Coal strike	2021–2023	Alabama
1,100	2007 Orange County transit strike	2007	Orange, California
1,100	1929 New Orleans streetcar strike	1929	New Orleans, Louisiana
+1,000	1934 Kohler strike	1934	Sheboygan, Wisconsin
1,000	1985–1987 Watsonville Cannery strike	1985–87	Watsonville, California
1,000 (~)	1913 El Paso smelters' strike	1913	El Paso, Texas
1,000	1916–1917 northern Minnesota lumber strike	1916–1917	Minnesota
1,000	2021 Nabisco strike	2021	Nationwide
+900	2021 Cook County nurses strike	2021	Cook County, Illinois
855	Hayward teachers strike	2007	Hayward, California
+800	2020 University of Illinois Hospital strikes	2020	Chicago
800	2021 Saint Vincent Hospital strike	2021	Worcester, Massachusetts
800	1828 Mill Women's Strike (New Hampshire)	1828	New Hampshire
800	Jeffboat wildcat strike	2001	Jeffersonville, Indiana
800	2012 Ports of Los Angeles and Long Beach strike	2012	Los Angeles and Long Beach, California
700	Pacific Electric Railway strike of 1903	1903	Los Angeles
700	1981 Schlitz strike	1981	Milwaukee
700	1985–1986 New Bedford fishermen's strike	1985–86	New Bedford, Massachusetts
700	2007 Freightliner wildcat strike	2007	Portland, Oregon
700	1964–1965 Scripto strike	1964–65	Atlanta
664 (~)	1912–1913 Little Falls textile strike	1912–1913	Little Falls, New York
+600	1934–35 Milwaukee sales clerks' strike	1934–35	Milwaukee
600	2021 Frito-Lay strike	2021	Topeka, Kansas
560 (~)	Wright State University 2019 faculty strike	2019	Dayton, Ohio
550	Frontier Hotel Culinary Workers (Las Vegas, US 1991–1998)	1991	Las Vegas
515	Buffalo switchmen's strike	1892	Buffalo, New York
420	2021 Heaven Hill strike	2021	Bardstown, Kentucky
400	2019 Alaska ferry workers strike	2019	Alaska
400	2020–2021 Alabama aluminum plant strike	2020–2021	Muscle Shoals, Alabama
400	Texas farm workers' strike	1966	Texas
400 at least	Weight Strike	1899	Ybor City, Tampa, Florida
382	2018 DeKalb County School District bus drivers' strike	2018	DeKalb County, Georgia
375	2020 Santa Cruz graduate students' strike	2020	Santa Cruz, California
350	2007 Broadway Stagehand Strike	2007	New York City
328	Port Chicago mutiny	1944	Port Chicago, California
300–400	Lattimer massacre	1897	Lattimer, Pennsylvania
300-400 (~)	1914–1915 Fulton Bag and Cotton Mills strike	1914–1915	Atlanta
300	Collar Laundry Union strike	1864	Troy, New York
250	2022–2023 HarperCollins strike	2022–2023	New York City
250	2003 June 15 Hospitality workers at the Congress Plaza Hotel.	2003	Chicago, Illinois
250	1949 Calvary Cemetery strike	1949	New York City
250	Coeur d'Alene labor confrontation	1899	Coeur d'Alene, Idaho
211	1968 St. Petersburg, FL sanitation strike	1968	St. Petersburg, Florida
+200	Disney animators' strike	1941	Burbank, California
+200	2018 Alabama Coca-Cola strike	2018	Alabama and Mississippi
225	1907 Skowhegan textile strike	1907	Skowhegan, Maine
200	2021 St. Paul Park refinery strike	2021	St. Paul Park, Minnesota
175	1835 Washington Navy Yard labor strike	1835	Washington Navy Yard, Washington D.C.
175	1983 Greyhound Bus Lines strike in Seattle	1983	Seattle
156	2021 St. Charles Bend strike	2021	Bend, Oregon
120	2018 Atlanta sanitation strike	2018	Atlanta
100	University of Miami Justice for Janitors campaign	2006	Coral Gables, Florida
80	Georgia Railroad strike	1909	Georgia
75	Camp Dump strike	1883	Omaha, Nebraska
75	1937 Fleischer Studios strike	1937	New York City
40	Indentured Servants' Plot	1661	Virginia colony
26	2020 New Orleans sanitation strike	2020	New Orleans
23	Century Airlines pilots' strike	1932	Chicago, Illinois
-	Minneapolis general strike of 1934	1934	Minneapolis, Minnesota
-	Great Northern Railway strike	1894	nationwide
-	Gulf Coast maritime workers' strike	1936	U.S. Gulf Coast
-	Indianapolis streetcar strike of 1913	1913	Indianapolis, Indiana
-	Los Angeles streetcar strike of 1919	1919	Los Angeles, California
-	Carbon County Strike	1903	Carbon County, Utah
-	Colorado Labor Wars, Western Federation of Miners	1903–1904	Colorado
-	1979 Boston University strike	1979	Boston
-	2021 Oregon Tech strike	2021	Oregon
-	2016–2017 video game voice actor strike	2016–2017	Los Angeles, California
-	2018 Taylorsville Georgia-Pacific strike	2018	Taylorsville, Mississippi
-	California agricultural strikes of 1933	1933	California
-	1934 New York hotel strike	1934	New York City
-	Strike for Black Lives	2020	Nationwide
-	Polish craftsmen's strike	1619	Jamestown
-	2021 Kaiser Permanente strike	2021	Nationwide
-	1834 Mill Women's Strike (Lowell, Massachusetts)	1834	Lowell, Massachusetts
-	1948 Miami Garment workers strike	1948	Miami, Florida
-	North Adams strike	1870	North Adams, Massachusetts
-	Boston garment worker strike	1907	Boston
-	Cotton pickers' strike of 1891	1891	Lee County, Arkansas
-	Upper Peninsula miners' strike	1865	Marquette, Michigan
-	Louisiana-Texas Lumber War of 1911–1912	1911–1912	Eastern Louisiana
-	Paint Creek–Cabin Creek strike of 1912	1912	Kanawha County, West Virginia
-	Pensacola streetcar operators' strike	1908	Pensacola, Florida
-	U.S. Steel recognition strike of 1901	1901	Homestead, Pennsylvania
-	Coal Creek War	1891	Anderson County, Tennessee
-	Newsboys' strike	1899	New York City
-	Seattle Fishermen halibut strike of 1912	1912–13	Seattle, Washington
-	1916 Atlanta streetcar strike	1916	Atlanta
-	Denver streetcar strike of 1920	1920	Denver, Colorado
-	1992 CSX railroad strike	1992	nationwide
-	1982 animators' strike	1982	Greater Los Angeles
-	1960 Writers Guild of America strike	1960	Hollywood, California
-	St. John's University strike of 1966–67	1966–67	New York City
-	2007–2008 CBS News writers strike	2007–2008	New York City
-	1919 Actors' Equity Association strike	1919	New York City
-	1942-43 musicians' strike	1942–43	nationwide
-	1981 Milwaukee Police strike	1981	Milwaukee
-	Boston Police Strike	1919	Boston, Massachusetts
-	1971 NYPD Work Stoppage	1971	New York City
-	1995 NBA lockout	1995	nationwide
-	1996 NBA lockout	1996–97	nationwide
-	2011 NBA lockout	2011	nationwide
-	1998–99 NBA lockout	1998–99	nationwide
-	1968 NFL strike/lockout	1968	Florida
-	2011 NFL lockout	2011	nationwide
-	2012 NFL referee lockout	2012	nationwide
-	1982 NFL strike	1982	nationwide
-	1974 NFL strike	1974	nationwide
-	1987 NFL strike	1987	nationwide
-	1992 NHL strike	1992	nationwide
-	1994–95 NHL lockout	1994–95	nationwide
-	2012–13 NHL lockout	2012–13	nationwide
-	2004–05 NHL lockout	2004–2005	nationwide
-	1990 Major League Baseball lockout	1990	nationwide
-	1994–95 Major League Baseball strike	1994–95	nationwide
-	1981 Major League Baseball strike	1981	nationwide
-	2010 Major League Soccer lockout/strike	2010	nationwide
-	1972 Major League Baseball strike	1972	nationwide
-	1985 Major League Baseball strike	1985	nationwide
-	Major Indoor Soccer League lockout	1986	nationwide
47,000	2024 United States port strike	2024	East Coast and Gulf Coast
2000	1999 Teamsters Overnite Transportation drivers strike	1999-2002	nationwide
45,000	Five day limited-duration strike relating to short staffing and inflation-related wage issues	2025	West Coast and Hawaii

== See also ==
- List of strikes
- List of striking US workers by year
