= Oakland general strike =

Oakland general strike may refer to:

- 1946 Oakland general strike
- 2011 Oakland general strike
