= 1983 AT&T strike =

US telecommunications strike

- Date: August 7, 1983 - August 28, 1983
- Location: United States
- Caused by: A breakdown in negotiations following the expiry of telecommunication workers' earlier contract
- Goals: 7% wage increase; Employment security; Training and retention programs
- Methods: Strike action; Sabotage
- Result: Strike ended following a tentative agreement between union and AT&T negotiators

Parties
Telephone workers; Communications Workers of America (CWA) 525,000 workers; International Brotherhood of Electrical Workers (IBEW) 100,000 workers; Telecommunications International Union (TIU) 50,000 workers	American Telephone and Telegraph Company (AT&T) and subsidiaries: Bell System; Southwestern Bell; Bell Operating Company; Bell Labs; Western Electric

Lead figures
Glenn Watts, CWA president; John Shaughnessy, TIU president	

Number
675,000	

The 1983 AT&T strike (August 7 – August 28, 1983) was a nationwide strike of 675,000 telephone workers across the United States that followed a breakdown in contract negotiations with the American telecommunications company AT&T.

The strike had a low impact on telephone services due to increased automation in the industry. Scattered incidents of sabotage served to keep strikebreakers in a state of crisis management over the course of the dispute.

The unions and AT&T negotiators both made concessions to reach a tentative agreement on August 28. Short of their initial goals, telecommunication workers were promised a 5.5% wage increase during the first year of the resulting contract and a 1.5% increase for the following two years.

== Background ==
The Communication Workers of America (CWA), the largest of the three unions involved in the strike, represented about 525,000 workers in the telecommunications industry at the time. The CWA previously struck AT&T in 1971. The two other unions involved in the strike, the International Brotherhood of Electrical Workers (IBEW) and Telecommunications International Union (TIU) represented about 100,000 and 50,000 workers respectively.

=== Divestiture of the Bell Operating Companies ===
Prior to the strike, AT&T was a regulated monopoly that controlled telecommunications infrastructure in the United States. In 1983, AT&T was divesting from its subsidiaries, breaking it into 22 local operating companies. This divestiture was set to formally occur on January 1, 1984. Among those responsible for overseeing the divestment were the managers of AT&T subsidiary Bell System.

As a monopoly, AT&T was able to subsidize certain services it provided by placing an artificial premium on others, like long-distance calls. Following its divestment and restructuring, AT&T expected to face competition that would undercut it on its premium services. This competition put downwards pressure on AT&T, leading it to reduce its workforce and reexamine worker salary and benefit packages. The CWA wanted to ensure its prior gains would be retained through the divestment.

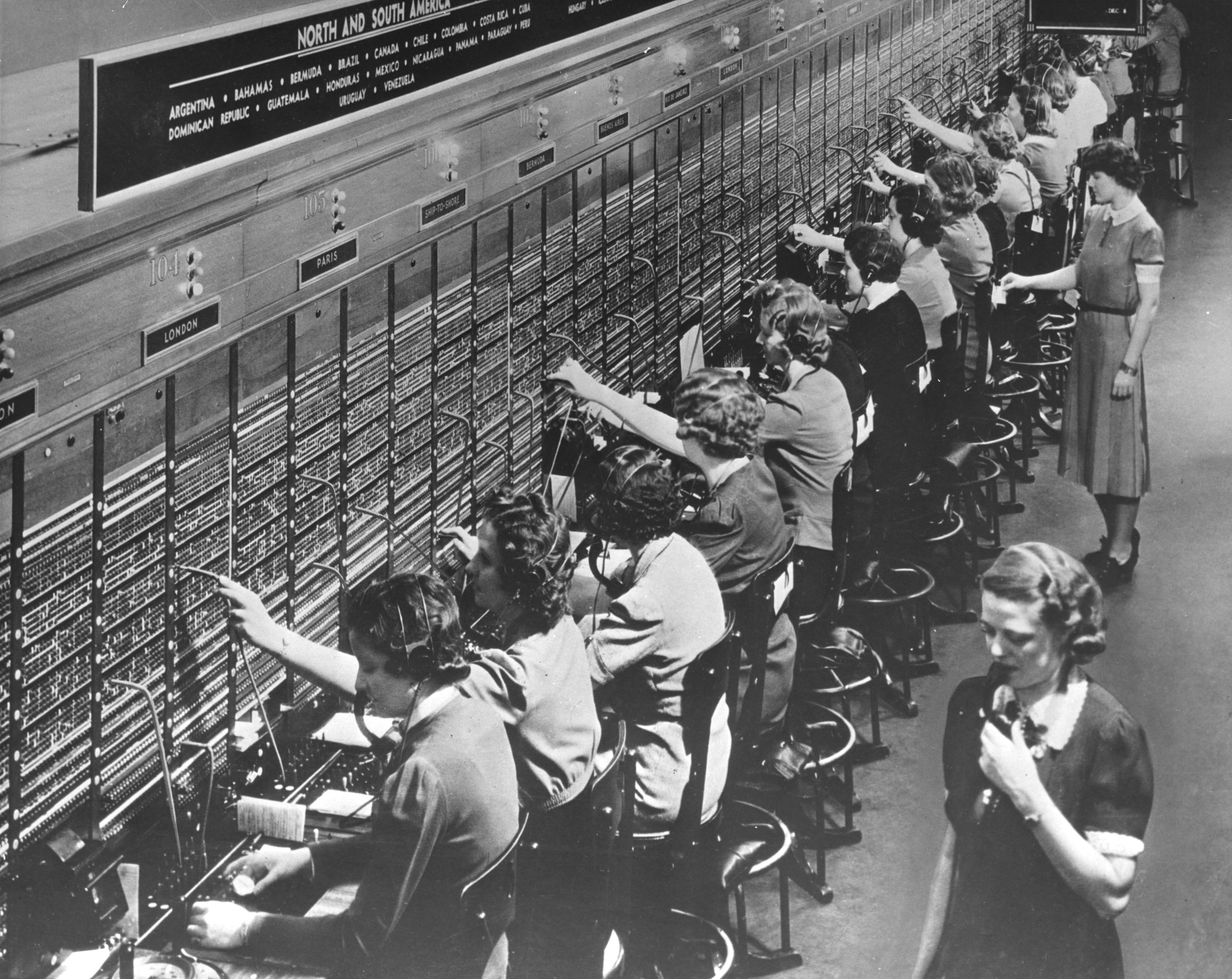
Switchboard operators were among the strikers, however their leverage was reduced by the popularity of direct dialing.

By the time the strike took place, 97% of basic phone services offered by AT&T had been automated, significantly reducing the leverage striking workers had over the company. During this time, most calls were dialed directly. One area where telecommunications workers retained leverage was in AT&T's divestment, as among the strikers were the clerical workers responsible for carrying out the process.

== Strike ==
The unions' previous contracts had been set to expire one minute after midnight on August 7, 1983. As the unions were unable to reach an agreement with AT&T before then, they immediately went on strike. At its peak, 675,000 telecommunications workers were on strike across the United States.

From the beginning of the strike, negotiators were at an impasse. AT&T wanted to offer workers in their top positions a pay raise of 0-2.7% over the contract period, while CWA negotiators wanted raises in the 20% range. AT&T wanted workers to pay 100% of their health premiums under the new contract and CWA workers wanted a comprehensive retraining program for workers displaced by technological change. By the end of the second week of the strike, union leadership stated there remained substantial differences between them and AT&T negotiators.

Part of what served to alleviate the impacts of the strike on customers was Bell System's decision move some of their 250,000 middle managers into the positions vacated by the strikers. During the strike, Bell System's middle management served as internal strikebreakers, operating switchboards in the place of striking workers. Managers had to work 12-hour shifts to cover for the striking operators. As the strike continued, AT&T decided to unlock all vending machines in their buildings, and later started offering free, catered meals for workers who crossed the picket line.

=== Demands ===
The telecommunications workers argued that they deserved as high as a 7% raise in order to reflect increased productivity and AT&T's favorable position in the market. AT&T was expecting to make $7 billion in profit that year. CWA president Glenn Watts said they were offered "virtually nothing" during negotiations. AT&T said it needed to preserve wages and reduce worker benefits in order to remain economically viable in the face of new competition.

Other demands included:

- Employment security
- A comprehensive retraining and worker retention program for workers displaced by technological change in the industry
- Improvements in workers' health and pension plans

Another concern for workers at the time was how AT&T's divestiture from Bell System would affect their rights as employees of AT&T, as many were slated to be moved to new companies.

=== Hurricane Alicia emergency response ===
Hurricane Alicia was a category-3 hurricane that affected Greater Houston. At the time, it was one of the most devastating hurricanes to impact the United States mainland, killing three people and costing $3 billion in damage.

Hurricane Alicia increased the workload on the already overburdened managers, as telecommunications infrastructure repair people were among those participating in the strike. The CWA offered to send some of its members to provide emergency repairs to infrastructure in the affected areas without pay. At first, AT&T accepted the CWA's offer, but later reversed its decision. AT&T suggested that workers returning to provide repairs would be crossing the picket line and denied entry to workers who wouldn't accept pay.

CWA spokesperson Duayne Trecker argued that Southwestern Bell was exploiting the effects of Hurricane Alicia to sway public opinion against the strikers, following a call to the public from Southwestern Bell seeking volunteers to restore telephone service to Texas residents affected by the hurricane. Trecker also claimed that the company threatened to replace all striking workers in the affected region, which AT&T spokesperson Pic Wagner denied. Local media responded more favorably to the unions than AT&T during the hurricane dispute.

=== Direct action ===
During the strike, there were scattered reports of vandalism of telephone equipment and incidents of violence related to the strike across the United States. The unions denied responsibility for these actions.

In New Jersey, there were 25 acts of sabotage reported within the first three days of the strike. These actions resulted in phone service being cut to the New Jersey state police barracks and the major army base Fort Dix. In Chicago, 47 acts of sabotage were reported in the first week, including a lit highway flare that was placed in a switching box, cutting phone service to the DuPage County Sheriff's Department. In California, Pacific Telephone reported 227 incidents of sabotage over the course of the strike.

In addition to the acts of sabotage, there was some militancy among the picket lines. In Providence, Rhode Island, strikers fought with mounted police, and one fight in Brooklyn led to three arrests and three police injuries.

Lucius Cabins, writing for the Processed World Collective, argued that workers chose to sabotage telecommunications infrastructure because they felt excluded from negotiations, which largely occurred in private meetings between union leadership and company management. The main role of rank and file workers during the strike was to participate in picket lines. The sabotage served to keep strikebreakers in a state of crisis management.

=== Effects ===
The 1983 AT&T strike did not obviously affect phone services for most customers because by then most calls were dialed directly. 97% of all basic phone services were completely automated.

The primary impacts of the strike were on repairs, installations, and access to operators and directory assistance. Internally, both the re-tasking of managers as strikebreakers and the significant participation of clerical workers in the strike served to stall important processes related to AT&T's divestiture.

== Outcome ==
In the third week of the strike, the CWA and AT&T came to a national agreement, but it would take an additional week to resolve all local disputes. The remaining locals finalized their agreements on the morning of August 29, 1983, bringing the 21-day strike to an end.

Both the unions and management made concessions in order to reach an agreement. The unions secured a $31 million fund for retraining workers whose jobs were made obsolete due to technological change in the telecommunications industry, in addition to an incentive-bonus program for early retirement. The telecommunications companies retained the ability to lay off workers based on market conditions, as no specific job security guarantees were made in the final contract. The telecommunwications workers were promised a 5.5% raise in the first year of the contract, and a 1.5% raise plus a cost of living adjustment during the second and third years, for a 18.4% cumulative raise over the contract's term. Additionally, AT&T would continue paying 100% of workers' health premiums.

The union attempted to sanction workers who chose to cross the picket line by ostracizing them and levying fines. Such fines are hard to enforce, and by the time the CWA was next on strike three years later, it had only collected fines from two workers.

== See also ==
- 2019 AT&T strike
- List of US strikes by size
- United States v. AT&T (1982) – the antitrust case that lead to the Bell System divestiture.
