= 1947 Telephone strike =

1947 labor strike across the United States

The 1947 Telephone strike was a five-week long, nation-wide labor stoppage in the United States by the National Federation of Telephone Workers (NFTW) and other smaller unions that started on April 7, 1947. The workers, mostly switchboard operators, were protesting long hours and low pay by AT&T, the Bell Telephone Company, the New York Telephone Company, and others. There were demonstrations throughout the United States with several instances of police arresting passive strikers. The mass of the strike was calculated to be equivalent to 10,100,000 man-days. In total around 370,000 workers struck.

23 days into the strike in New York, non-NFTW union officials and the New York Telephone Company settled their demands, and 40,000 workers began working again the next day. At the same time, the Bell Telephone Company reached an agreement with non-NFTW union officials in Pennsylvania, and 6,000 maintenance workers resumed their jobs the next day as well. These Pennsylvanian workers received a $4 per week wage increase rather than the $12 per week they had originally demanded.

The workers in the NFTW were able to strike for five weeks without having to break and return to work because of the financial support totaling $128,000 given to them by both the American Federation of Labor and the Congress of Industrial Organizations.

The strike eventually caused the dissolution of the NFTW, which inspired the creation of the Communications Workers of America union.

== See also ==
- List of strikes
- List of US strikes by size
