= 1979–1980 International Harvester strike =

- Date: November 1, 1979 - April 20, 1980

Number
35,000	

The International Harvester strike of 1979–1980 was a strike by the United Auto Workers (UAW) against the International Harvester (IH) company over work rules. The strike began on November 1, 1979, and ended after 172 days on April 20, 1980. As of May 2008, it was the fourth-longest strike of national importance ever held by the UAW.

== Background ==
=== Previous bargaining history ===
The International Harvester logo.

The UAW first negotiated a master contract with International Harvester in 1950. At the time, there was no mandatory overtime and both management and the union believed that the company could not request mandatory overtime. The 1950 master contract also codified an existing practice whereby a worker could transfer to any other job in the company provided he or she was the most senior applicant for the position.

During the 1958 contract renewal talks, International attempted to restrict job transfer rights. The union struck for nine weeks, and IH dropped the demand in exchange for other concessions.

Between 1961 and 1976, four of the six 3-year contracts were signed only after the union struck—although each of the strikes was short, lasting from two hours to two and a half weeks. There were also a large number (more than 100) wildcat strikes during this period. After a 15-day strike in 1973, the union agreed to include a side letter into the contract in which the union agreed to encourage employees to voluntarily agree to work overtime (with advance notice, and only up to seven Saturdays a year)—although few employees ever volunteered.

By the late 1970s, International Harvester had come to believe that unlimited transfer rights were being abused and creating productivity problems. The company also instituted a new disciplinary program to crack down on wildcat strikes, and outlasted one UAW local when it engaged in a five-week-long wildcat strike in 1978 in an attempt to have the program withdrawn.

=== McCardell takes over ===
In 1979, International Harvester was the fourth-largest company in the United States.

Archie McCardell was appointed president and chief operating officer of International Harvester in August 1977, named chief executive officer in January 1978, and chairman of the board in June 1979. He was charged with shaking up the family-run company to increase profitability. He received a then-exorbitant salary of $460,000 (making him one of the highest-paid CEOs in the country), a $1.5 million signing bonus and a $1.8 million loan at 6 percent interest. He instituted an aggressive cost-cutting program which immediately cut spending by $640 million and a modernization program which poured $879 million over three years into the company's plants. His actions boosted market share, and led to record sales of $8.4 billion and record profits of $370 million (up from $203 million). Despite McCardell's actions, IH's profit margins were still only half those of competitors like Caterpillar Inc. and Deere & Company.

Among the many changes McCardell made was to fire 11,000 of the company's 15,000 mid- and upper-level managers, whom McCardell felt were too close to UAW shop stewards. McCardell took personal control of IH's labor relations, and appointed a new vice president of human resources, W. Grant Chandler (who was to assist McCardell in all union negotiations). McCardell's actions stripped the company of nearly all its experienced labor negotiators, and those who remained were mostly ignored during the upcoming round of negotiations. McCardell and Chandler had little labor relations experience, however, and none in heavy manufacturing or in negotiating with the UAW.

=== Early negotiations ===
Negotiations opened on August 9, 1979, in Chicago, Illinois. UAW International Vice President Pat Greathouse and two veteran IH negotiators—Art Shy, and Cletus Williams—led a union bargaining team composed of 20 representatives from 51 IH local unions. Among the proposed changes to the contract that the union proposed was that the union contract be automatically extended to any new plants opened by International Harvester—essentially allowing the union to organize new workers without holding an election.

Instead of a similar long list of demands (which the company had traditionally countered with in the past), Chandler gave the union only seven demands and advised it that these proposals must be dealt with, strike or no strike. The proposals were aimed at largely ending job transfers and seniority, adding five shifts a week, and instituting a mandatory overtime scheme; the company claimed it had lost $1.3 billion over the previous three years over these issues. Many companies in turnaround seek to improve product design and production processes, and managerial expertise before seeking labor concessions. But McCardell concluded that the fastest way to achieve cost savings was to persuade workers to accept work rules changes which would have cost employees $100 million. Surprisingly, however, IH agreed to match the pay increase pattern set earlier in the year by automobile manufacturers in Detroit.

Despite the concession, these early negotiations did not go well. McCardell and Chandler were inexperienced negotiatiors, not picking up on the private signals the union sent and did not understand the importance of the signals when they did become aware of them. Even company-side negotiators complained about the inexperience of McCardell and Chandler, arguing that this inexperience lessened the company's ability to divine the union's real bargaining positions. When McCardell and Chandler were not at the bargaining table, negotiators who were present had no real authority to bargain on behalf of the company. Combined, these two factors significantly hindered IH's bargaining abilities. As one scholar pointed out: "There was no sense that the company negotiators had the capacity to understand the industry, the union's positions, or the politics that these leaders faced; neither were these negotiators truly free to develop that understanding."

Other company actions unintentionally hardened negotiating positions and decreased trust between the two parties. The company moved the negotiations out of a neutral local hotel and into management conference rooms, limited informal side conversations (which had been used in the past to explore compromises), refused to build social ties with the union bargainers, refused to informally signal their true intentions, and ignored symbolic issues (one IH negotiator wore a silk suit to negotiations, which offended the blue-collar negotiators).

International Harvester also unintentionally disempowered the union negotiators, making it harder for them to agree to company demands. For example, the company repeatedly went public with its bargaining proposals, which made it harder for company negotiators to back down later and reach compromises. The company's "match the pay pattern" announcement also had the effect of depriving union leaders of the ability to claim a "win" in negotiations by claiming they had achieved a pay raise—making it harder for union negotiators to "sell" more hard-to-swallow compromises later, and forcing the union to entrench itself to achieve gains in other areas.

The talks recessed after just one day.

Less than a week later, International Harvester reported on August 15, 1979, record sales and earnings for the first nine months of fiscal 1979. Year-to-year net earnings for the third quarter rose $1.12 per share to $2.19, and the year-to-year third quarter dividend raised 5 cents to 62.5 cents. Net income for the quarter rose to $67.91 million, an 89 percent increase over the same period last year, and net income for the first three quarters of the year was $221.9 million, a 95 percent increase over the previous year. The company said prospects for the final quarter also looked strong.

Bargaining resumed on August 21, 1979.

International Harvester's behavior at and away from the bargaining table, coupled with the company's exceedingly positive economic news, hardened the UAW's bargaining position. On September 14, 1979, the UAW said it would strike all heavy-equipment manufacturers it was negotiating with if new collective bargaining agreements were not reached. The UAW's contract at International Harvester expired on October 1, 1979. But despite the union's more rigid stands, a council of all 51 IH local unions agreed to extend the contract on a day-to-day basis as negotiations continued.—a decision opposed by the international union.

In late October, IH received mixed signals about the Auto Workers' intentions and capabilities. On October 18, the union reached a new three-year agreement with Deere & Co. after an 18-day strike by 31,000 employees, while at the same time 23,000 of Caterpillar's 40,000 workers engaged in a wildcat strike to protest the slow pace of negotiations at that company. Six days later, the union made it clear it would strike IH if no agreement was reached, but IH officials merely reiterated that their seven demands must be met. Another 17,000 Caterpillar workers struck on October 28, and IH officials suggested that the UAW would be too financially exhausted and organizationally stretched too thin to engage in a third strike. International Harvester refused to budge on its demand for mandatory overtime.

== Strike ==
The union did strike, however. On November 1, 1979, 35,000 UAW workers (36 percent of International Harvester's workforce) at 21 plants in eight states—Georgia, Illinois, Indiana, Kansas, Kentucky, Minnesota, Ohio, Tennessee, and Texas—struck International Harvester at noon rather than accept the new work rules and mandatory overtime provisions. But McCardell was not alarmed, seeing the strike as a way to challenge the union's power in the workplace and as an opportunity to improve efficiency by regaining concessions the company had made in the past.

For nearly a month, no talks were held. The two sides met briefly on Monday, November 26, for roughly an hour, but no progress was made. Thereafter, the union stepped up its pressure on the company. Bargaining reopened on December 13. As the talks resumed, the UAW settled the strike at Caterpillar, ending what was then the longest strike in history against that heavy-equipment manufacturer. Nonetheless, talks broke off December 15, the same day the Caterpillar strike ended. Days later, International Harvester announced a year-to-year increase of 98 percent in its profits for the entire fiscal year. Yearly earnings reached a record $369.9 million, and sales rose a 25.9 percent to reach a record $8.4 billion. Net income nearly doubled to $12.01 a share (up from $6.14 a share). But on January 10, 1980, the company said that losses in the first quarter of the year (November 1979 to January 1980) could be as high as $225 million (or 10 percent of the company's shareholders' equity) if the strike continued. To help weather the strike, International Harvester's top 25 officers took 20 percent salary cuts, travel expenses were curtailed, meetings were cancelled or moved to company offices, the budget for the annual stockholders' meeting scaled back, advertising spending curtailed, capital spending slashed by $100 million (to $400 million), and a new line of credit established to provide access to emergency funds (if needed). McCardell, however, vowed to continue to seek agreement on the company's seven demands.

In mid-December 1979, the Fort Wayne Journal Gazette quoted an internal International Harvester memorandum (written in January 1979) in which the company appeared to advocate manufacturing plant decentralization as part of a plan to break the union. The memo specifically mentioned a new IH plant to be built in Wagoner, Oklahoma (a right-to-work state) which would eliminate unionized jobs at the company's Fort Wayne plant. The memo said the Wagoner plant was only the first step in a scheme to slowly dismantle the Fort Wayne plant. The memo outraged the union, which felt the company had intended to bargain in bad faith over its contract extension proposal.

The company's tendency to go public with negotiating positions led to further entrenchment on both sides, and no talks were scheduled for most of January.

While International Harvester was forced to cut costs, the United Auto Workers improved its financial position. On January 30, 1980, the union gave striking workers a $15-a-week across-the-board increase in strike benefits, raising the benefit to $55 a week for a single worker and $65 a week for married workers with dependents.

The company and union resumed talks on February 4, 1980, but the discussions ended after just one day. IH modified its overtime proposal to require worker consent, and asked the union to create a group of part-time employees who would be mandated to work overtime when not enough regulartime employees could be found to work. The union rejected the proposal without explanation and walked out of the talks. The strike, by now the longest in International Harvester's history as well as the longest in UAW history (surpassing the old record of 117 days), resumed and the union threatened to stay on the picket line until March if necessary. Industry analysts worried that IH would begin to lose market share as its inventories dropped.

As the annual company shareholders' meeting approached, the union accused International Harvester of attempting to prevent union members' attendance. The United Auto Workers, which owned six shares of Harvester stock, accused the company of deliberately selecting a meeting hall which was too small to accommodate the number of union members who would be voting those shares and issuing too-few tickets to permit admission for the union members. The union filed an injunction in United States district court to force International Harvester to admit its members.

Days before the shareholder meeting, International Harvester reported a first-quarter loss of $222.2 million. The company also admitted that unfilled orders of $4.2 billion, up from $2.8 billion a year earlier, and attributed the loss and backlog to the effects of the strike. Despite the loss, the company still paid a dividend of 62.5 cents a share for the quarter.

The annual shareholders' meeting, held at the First Chicago Center in Chicago on February 21, was described by the press as "turbulent." On February 20, the union obtained a court order requiring International Harvester to set up closed-circuit television facilities so members of the UAW and other shareholders could observe the meeting. The overflow room was at a hotel several blocks away. But when the meeting opened with about 200 seats still empty, McCardell delayed proceedings for an hour as 175 UAW members were brought from the hotel to the First Chicago Center. The UAW bitterly attacked McCardell throughout the proceedings. Cletus Williams, chairman of the UAW's negotiating committee, accused McCardell of manipulating the shareholders' meeting so that many UAW members didn't know they could attend until it was too late. Despite the rancorous shareholders' meeting, bargainers resumed talks that same day. IH once more altered its overtime proposal, suggesting that employees be required to work up to 14 Saturdays a year and establishing a voluntary pool of part-time workers to fill in shifts when not enough full-time workers volunteered to work a particular Saturday shift. But the company withdrew its proposal when the union declared its opposition.

IH's financial situation worsened on March 6, 1980, when Moody's Investors Services downgraded the company's short-term bond credit rating from Prime 1 to Prime 2. The company estimated the downgrade would cost it $4 million in profits by the end of the fiscal year. In yet another cost-cutting move, 8,000 of the company's 10,000 salaried and management employees were forced to take a week's vacation due to low workloads. Rumors of yet another management pay cut came amid signs that the company was planning to sell its construction equipment business to raise money.

But talks did not break off after resuming during the annual shareholder's meeting. Mounting losses and the arrival of farm implement sales season kept the company at the bargaining table and led to agreements on a short-term layoff provision and the job-transfer issue. Negotiators agreed to negotiate over local matters affecting each plant and settle these before returning to the more contentious national issues. Six local unions quickly settled their local issues.

On March 18, 1980, negotiators for both sides announced they had reached a tentative agreement on the mandatory overtime issue. According to the Associated Press, full-time workers and retirees could volunteer to become part of a special overtime pool which could be drawn from to fill vacant weekend work shifts. Seniority, holiday pay and the ability of piece workers to go home after fulfilling their quotas were still outstanding. Forty-two locals had also settled their local issues contracts during the previous week, leaving only six large locals with outstanding agreements.

Amid calls to submit the unfinished tentative agreements to the membership for ratification and halt the strike, the 300 members of the International Harvester council of 51 local unions overwhelmingly rejected any such proposals. Because the job transfer, new plant contract extension, and the piece worker issues were all still outstanding, the council felt it could not recommend ratification. With six of IH's largest local unions still negotiating, International vice president Pat Greathouse announced that the UAW was breaking off talks at the national level in order to focus on these local contracts. The company agreed, feeling the six large locals—located in East Moline and Rock Island, Illinois; Fort Wayne, Indiana; Springfield, Ohio; and Louisville, Kentucky—were "the key" to ending the strike.

The council's decision not to recommend ratification lead to a break in the UAW's hierarchy. The day after the decision, Cletus Williams, chairman of the UAW bargaining council, announced that his union—Local 1357 in Canton, Illinois—would take a non-binding vote on the unfinished contract by the end of the weekend. But on Sunday, March 22, 1980, members of Local 1357 rejected Williams' plan to conduct a non-binding vote.

Although the East Moline and Rock Island locals settled their local contracts in the next week, local issue bargaining collapsed after three days. The job transfer issue prevented resolution of the remaining four local contracts. The company believed that if these four local contracts could be settled, the strike would end. Company and union negotiators recommitted themselves to the bargaining process, and an agreement was reached at three more plants the following week The final plant settled its local contact on April 14. National contract talks resumed the following day.

== End of the strike ==
After two days of bargaining, International Harvester and the United Auto Workers reached a tentative agreement on the national master contract on April 16, 1980.

The UAW ratified the three-year contract by a vote of 15,494 in favor and 3,877 against on April 19, 1980. Local 1309 in Rock Island, Ill., and Local 1077 in Shadyside, Ohio, rejected the master agreement apparently because they disagreed with the plan to gradually resume work; those locals remained independently on strike.

The agreement on mandatory overtime provided for little more than the 1973 side letter had already gained for the company.

The contentious issue of limitations on the number and type of job transfers was dropped from the master contract and addressed to varying degrees in plant-level agreements. Limitations varied widely. In one plant, employees could make no more than five transfer requests at one time (files would be purged every six months), there were no restrictions on transfers to higher-paying jobs, and lateral and downward transfer requests were limited to six a year. At other plants, a few stricter limitations were set, such as limiting transfers to one every 90 days. But industry analysts agreed that these were marginal gains.

IH also agreed to extend the union contract to only one new plant. The pact only covered the proposed facility in Wagoner, Okla. While union members would be given preference for jobs at Wagoner, they would lose their seniority and would have to accept the Wagoner plant's pay and fringe benefits (which remained to be negotiated).

UAW chief negotiator Pat Greathouse called the contract an "overwhelming victory" for UAW members.

Nearly all independent commentators saw the agreement as a losing proposition for International Harvester. The company had incurred deep financial costs, lost market share, and achieved none of its key demands despite McCardell's assertions that the proposals were critical to the company's success. "[T]here is no question the company is the big loser in this one," one Wall Street analyst said.

The strike lasted 172 days, at the time making it (at the time) the longest in UAW history and the longest strike in International Harvester history. International Harvester made key errors—including using inexperienced negotiators, going public with bargaining demands, and attacking key union issues such as seniority and the lack of mandatory overtime without giving itself room to negotiate—which greatly prolonged the strike. The seeming arrogance of top company officials is considered by many to be a serious strategic error. Company officials seemed surprised that the union could hold out for any length of time, and McCardell appeared to assume that the international union staff (not rank and file members) were pushing for a strike.

== Aftermath ==
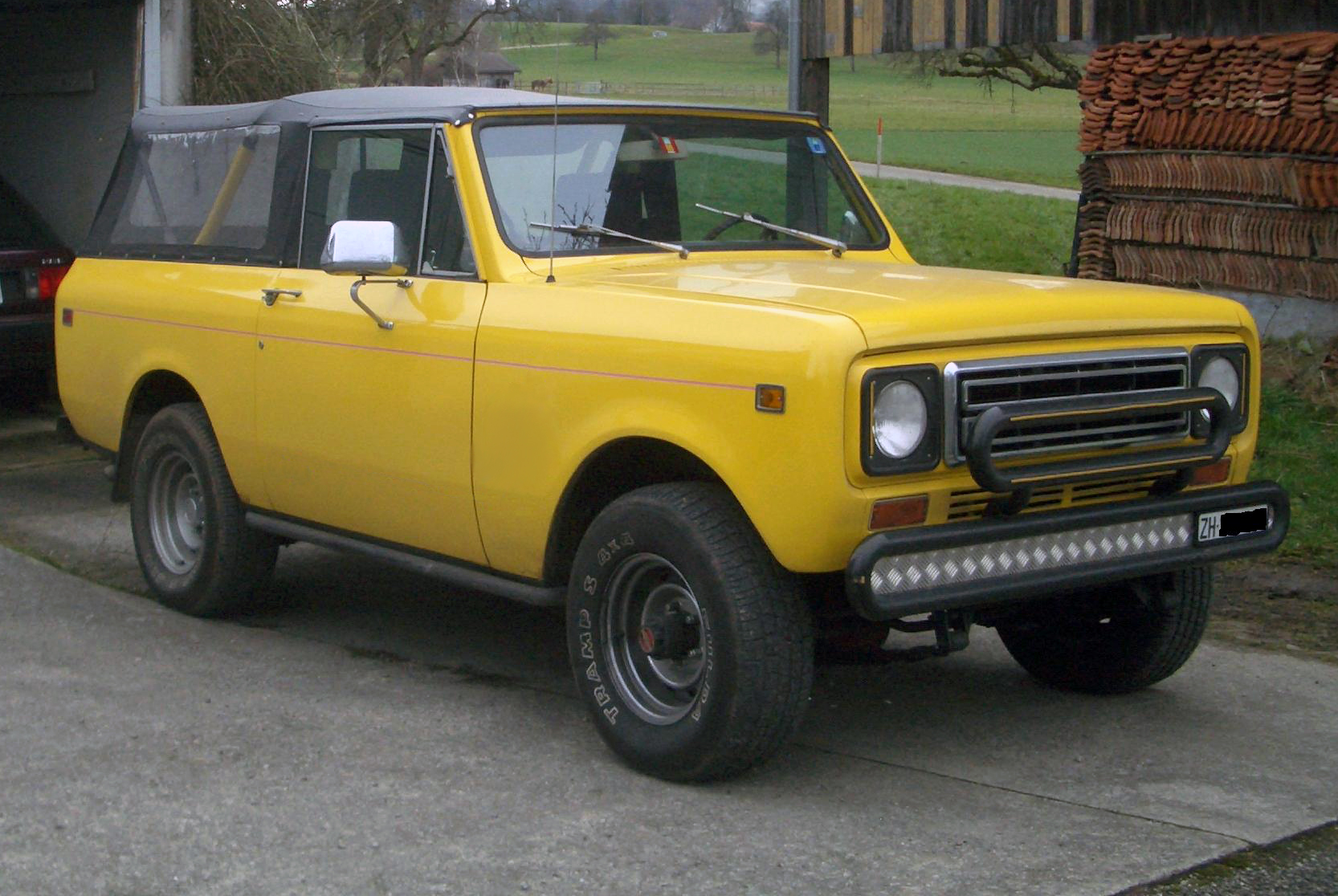
A 1979 International Scout. Production of the Scout ended in October 1980, due to lack of funds to make changes needed for 1981. An attempt was made to sell the Scout to Texas investors, but this fell through.

International Harvester incurred significant delays in resuming operations. Plants in Rock Island and East Moline took several weeks to resume work. Several small UAW-represented craft unions which were not part of the master contract talks continued to strike at IH's Louisville plant. The large blue-collar locals refused to cross the picket line (which was their right under the contract), keeping the plant shut.

The strike severely impacted the company's financial status. International Harvester lost $257.2 million in the second quarter, for a total of $479.4 million in the first half of the year, while sales slid 47.3 percent. The company confirmed earlier rumors and put its Scout utility vehicle division up for sale to help cover the losses, and by the end of April 1980 was forced to take out loans which increased its short-term debt from $442 million to a staggering $1 billion.

International Harvester never recovered from the strike. In November 1981, IH asked the UAW for $100 million in wage and benefit concessions. Rising interest rates, demand weakened by the early 1980s recession, and high manufacturing costs pushed the company's total debt to a whopping $4.5 billion. On December 23, 1981, the company reached an agreement with 200 of its lenders to refinance $4.15 billion of its debt in a bid to avoid bankruptcy. On January 20, 1982, the UAW rejected Harvester's request for concessions because McCardell had just given $6 million in bonuses to salaried employees. But with the firm's financial condition rapidly worsening, the UAW opened negotiations in March 1982. Negotiators reached a tentative agreement nearly two years to the day after the 1979–1980 strike ended, giving Harvester $200 million in wage, benefit, pension, and other savings over three years.

On May 3, 1982, one day after the UAW ratified the concessionary contract, Archie McCardell was fired by International Harvester. Although McCardell asserted he had resigned, industry and press observers said that he was fired. Time reported that the company's 16-member board of directors met in a two-hour meeting over the weekend. Pushed by the company's debtor banks, the board finally agreed to fire McCardell. "The real wonder was that McCardell had not been ousted much earlier," Time said.

The company's downward financial spiral continued. For fiscal year 1980, 1981, and 1982, International Harvester incurred a combined three-year loss of $2.4 billion—the largest such three-year loss for any American company in history at the time. International Harvester sold its farm equipment division to Tenneco in 1985, and changed its name in 1986 to Navistar International as a result of its downsizing to simply a truck and engine manufacturer. Thirty-eight years later, the company rechristened itself to International Motors LLC.

Pat Greathouse retired from the UAW in May 1980.
