= 2022–2023 HarperCollins strike =

American labor dispute in New York City

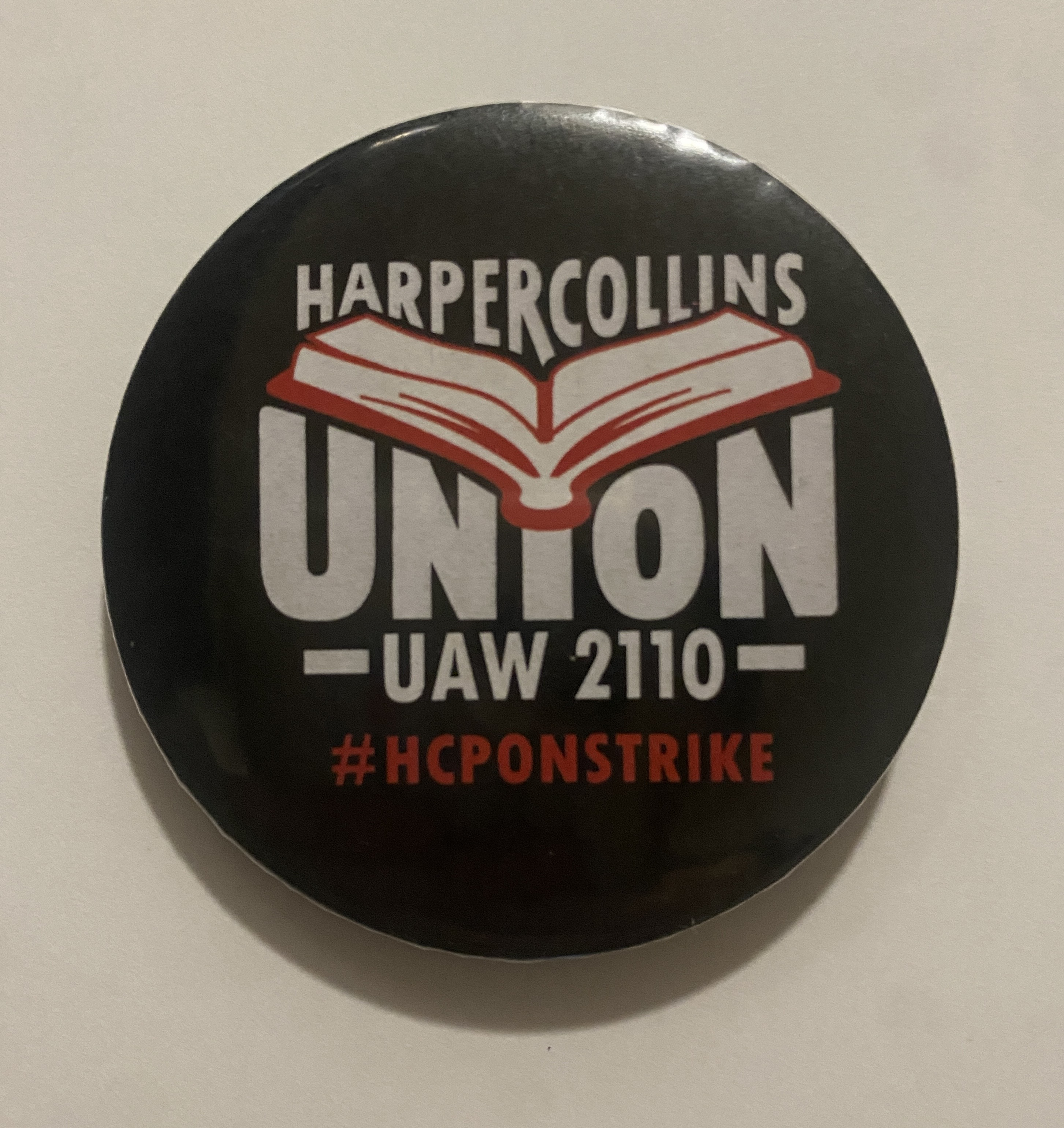
- Date: November 10, 2022 – February 21, 2023 (3 months, 1 week and 4 days)
- Location: New York City, New York, United States; 40°42′39″N 74°0′35″W
- Caused by: Disagreements over the terms of a new labor contract
- Goals: Improved parental leave benefits; Improved protections for union members; Increase in starting salaries from $45,000 to $50,000; Commitment to improving diversity in the workplace
- Methods: Picketing; Strike action
- Result: Company and union agree to labor contract, which include, among other provisions: Increase in starting salary from $45,000 to $50,000 by 2025; One-time bonus payment of $1,500 to union members; Changes to overtime and remote work regulations

Parties
United Auto Workers Local 2110	HarperCollins

The 2022–2023 HarperCollins strike was a labor strike involving about 250 workers for HarperCollins, an American publishing company headquartered in the New York City borough of Manhattan. The workers, members of the United Auto Workers (UAW) Local 2110, went on strike on November 10, 2022, after failing to reach an agreement with the company regarding a new labor contract. The union members returned to work on February 21, 2023, after agreeing to a new contract that addressed many of the concerns they had initially had, including an increase in starting salaries and changes to some work regulations.

HarperCollins is one of the largest publishing companies in the United States. In 2022, it had a global workforce of about 4,000, with about 250 of these employees at their Manhattan headquarters represented by UAW Local 2110. The local union had been established at a predecessor company in the 1940s and was unique as one of the only unions representing white-collar workers in the publishing industry. Beginning in December 2021, the union and company began to negotiate the terms for a new labor contract, as the existing one was set to expire on December 31, though the contract was extended into the following year as negotiations continued. However, by April 2022, the contract fully expired and the company and union were still unable to come to a solid agreement regarding a new contract, with the union requesting increased starting salaries, better union protections, improved parental leave benefits, and a greater commitment from the company to diversity in the workplace. On July 20, about 100 union members staged a one-day strike to protest the company, picketing outside their headquarters at 195 Broadway. In October, union members voted by an overwhelming majority to authorize an open-ended strike, which commenced with picketing on November 10.

From the beginning of the strike, many notable authors, such as Alexander Chee and Lauren Groff, voiced their support for the strikers, and on December 8, about 500 authors signed a letter to executives of the company urging them to negotiate an end to the strike, with many saying they would not be considering the company for publishing any of their works during the labor dispute. By late January 2023, the company and union agreed to federal mediation, which began in early February. On February 9, both sides announced a tentative deal that the union would submit for approval by its members within the next several days. Union members voted to approve the agreement on February 16 and return to work on February 21, bringing an end to the strike.

Union members generally viewed the new contract as a success. The agreement, which would run until December 31, 2025, included, among other things, a gradual increase in starting salaries from $45,000 to $50,000 by 2025, changes to overtime and remote work regulations, and a one-time bonus payment of $1,500 to union members. Union members and several publications also expressed the opinion that the results of the strike could have repercussions for the entire publishing industry, as several other companies agreed to raise their starting salaries around the same time.

== Background ==
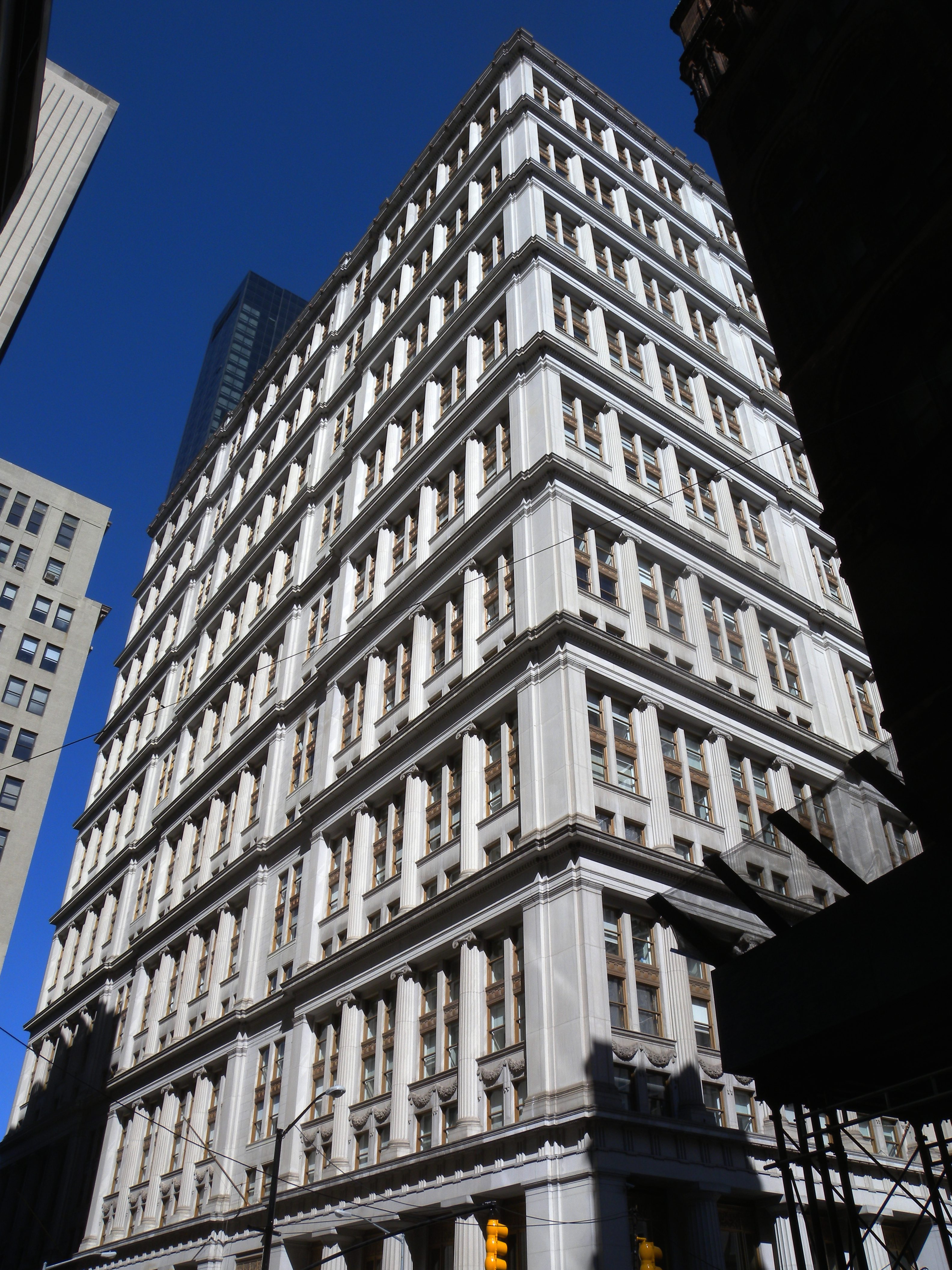
195 Broadway, the headquarters for HarperCollins in Manhattan (pictured 2010)

HarperCollins is an American publishing company headquartered at 195 Broadway in the New York City borough of Manhattan. The company, owned by the Rupert Murdoch-led News Corp, is considered one of the "Big Four" English-language publishers, alongside Macmillan Publishers, Penguin Random House, and Wiley. In 2021, about 250 employees were members of the United Auto Workers (UAW) Local 2110, a labor union representing a fraction of the company's total global workforce of about 4,000. The local union traces its history to the 1940s, when it organized workers for Harper, a predecessor company to HarperCollins. The local union became affiliated with the UAW in the 1980s. It was one of the first established for white-collar workers in the publishing industry, and in 2021, the company was the only one of the Big Four in the United States to have a union such as that representing some of their workers. According to a 2022 article in Fast Company, the union, "with its decades of history and big-fish status, is the only one of its kind for now". These union members, mainly women, were primarily members of the company's design, editorial, legal, marketing, publicity, and sales departments. Beginning in December 2021, representatives of the company and the union began to negotiate the terms of a new labor contract, as the existing one was scheduled to expire on December 31. However, this deadline passed without a new contract in place, and both sides agreed to an extension of the existing contract while they continued to negotiate a new one.

Over the next several months of negotiations, the two sides failed to come to an agreement, with Local 2110 requesting better protections for union members, improved parental leave benefits, higher pay, and a commitment from the company to improve diversity in the workplace. With regards to the first demand, the union was requesting an implementation of a union security agreement that would require all eligible employees at the company to join the union, a stipulation that had been present in the agreements between the company and union prior to the 1980s, when it was removed. Regarding the latter two demands, several publications—including The Guardian in 2022—noted that the publishing industry has a notoriety for low wages and lack of racial diversity. Several articles in The New York Times published around the same time cited low average pay as a barrier in diversifying the industry. According to a report by PEN America issued around this time, careers in the publishing industry continued to be disproportionately represented by white people, with diversity decreasing among management and other senior positions.

On average, union members at HarperCollins earned $55,000 per year, with starting salaries of $45,000, while median salaries for editors in the city was about $85,000. These starting salaries were comparable to other publishing firms, with Macmillan offering starting salaries of $42,000 per year and Hachette Book Group offering $45,000 to employees in locations with high costs of living. New York City, where HarperCollins is based, has a high cost of living, with several sources reporting that many entry and midlevel workers in the city's publishing industry often have to rely on second jobs or financial support from family members or a spouse to afford living there. The Guardian reported on one instance of an employee hired in 2016 with a starting salary of $33,500, which they said was "well below a livable wage in New York City". As a result, the union requested an increase in starting salaries from $45,000 to $50,000. At the time that negotiations were ongoing, HarperCollins had reported record profits in 2021, in line with other publishing firms that had seen record growth during the COVID-19 pandemic. However, by late 2022, the company reported an 11 percent drop in revenue and a 54 percent decline in earnings, to $39 million. Regarding the negotiations, Local 2110 President Olga Brudastova said, "HarperCollins has been reporting record breaking profits. Compensation is not keeping up with the rate of inflation and doesn’t reflect the contributions our members make to the company".

Beginning in April, Local 2110 members began working without a contract while negotiations were still underway. On July 20, about 100 union members and other supporters picketed outside of the company's headquarters in a one-day strike action against the company. In October, after months of negotiations, union members voted to authorize an open-ended strike, with about 95.1 percent voting in favor. This came the same month that the company, in a cost-cutting measure, announced the firing of several employees, including 6 union members. By November 9, Brudastova said that the firings were "disheartening" and further stated, "Late last week, the company communicated to us over email that they are not interested in scheduling more bargaining sessions and are rejecting our latest proposal. We now get information that management is instructing non-union employees to avoid any mention of the strike and is planning to override our members' out-of-office messages that mention it". In response to both the firings and the failure to reach an agreement, the union filed an unfair labor practice charge against the company with the National Labor Relations Board. In response, a spokesperson for the company stated, "HarperCollins has agreed to a number of proposals that the United Auto Workers Union is seeking to include in a new contract. We are disappointed an agreement has not been reached and will continue to negotiate in good faith". The planned strike came amidst a nationwide surge in support for labor unions, with about 71 percent of the country expressing a positive view of them, the highest percentage since 1965. The strike would be the first one for the local union since a 17-day strike in 1974.

== Course of the strike ==
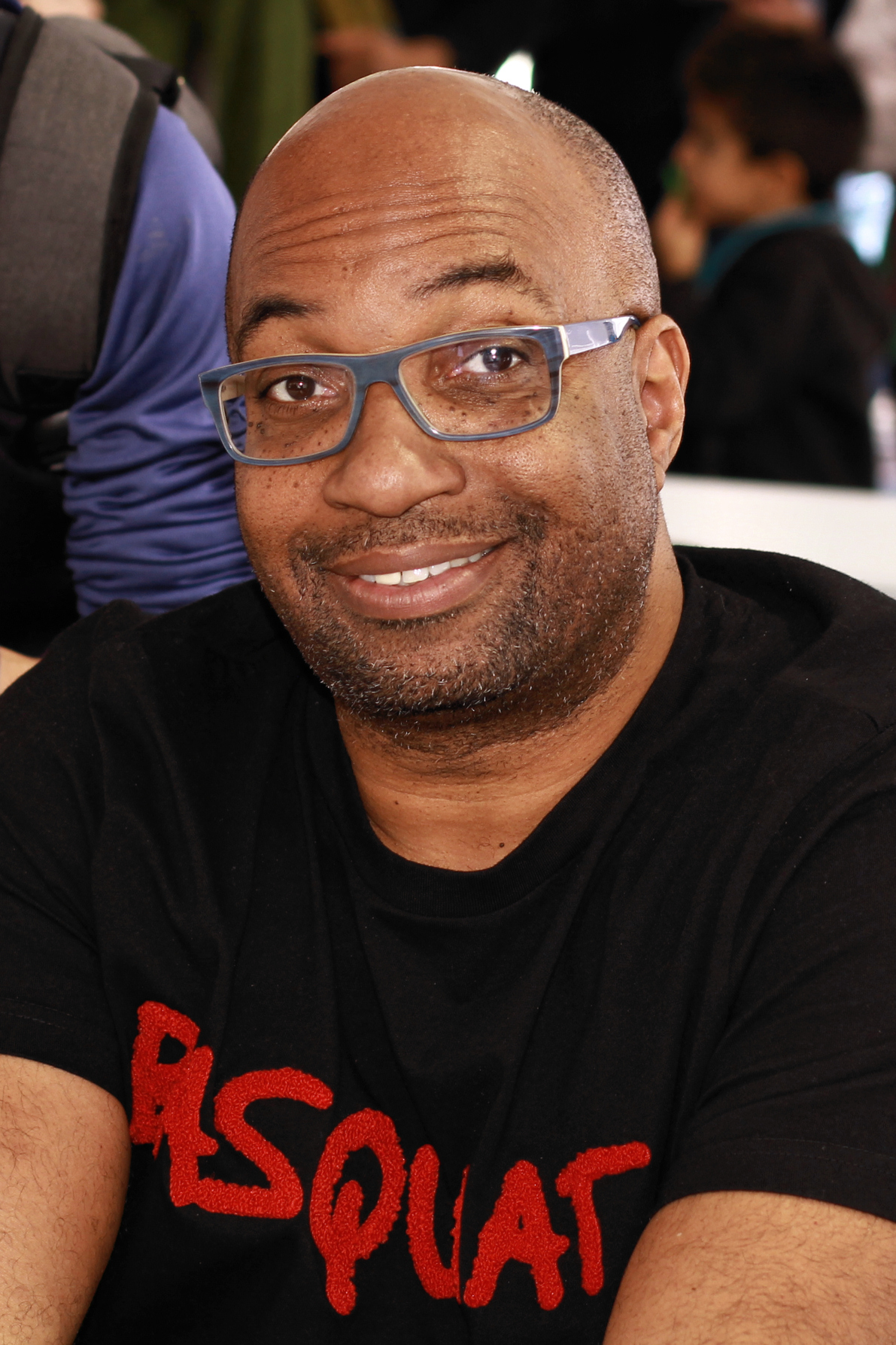
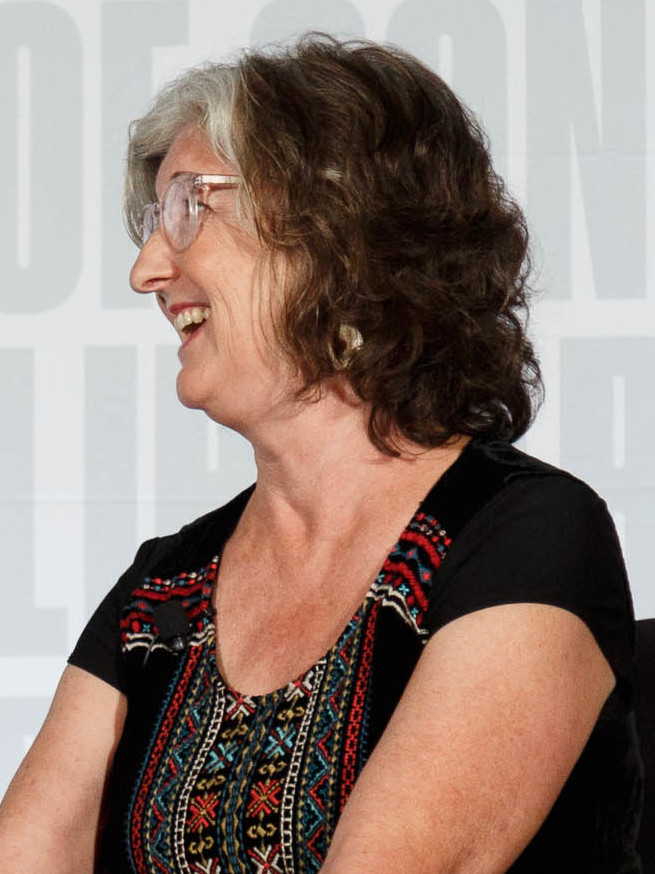
Kwame Alexander and Barbara Kingsolver (both pictured 2019) were among several authors to publicly voice their support for the strike.

The strike began on Thursday, November 10, with about a hundred picketers protesting outside the company's Manhattan headquarters. Many of the signs, which were created during a union session in Brooklyn's Prospect Park, contained puns based on books published by HarperCollins, such as "Where The Wild Things Are Underpaid" and "If you give a mouse a fair contract". From the strike's outset, many authors, including those whose works were published by HarperCollins, voiced their support for the strike, such as Alexander Chee, Lauren Groff, and Daniel José Older. By November 23, the union stated that they had not been in discussion with the company and that there were no plans for further negotiations at that time. Strikers at this time were given $400 per week in strike pay. On December 6, after several weeks of striking, HarperCollins chief executive officer Brian Murray released an open letter wherein he stated that the company was offering starting salaries above any New York City-based competitor, as well as many other employee benefits, and said that the union was trying to force a union security agreement that, according to Murray, would force the company to fire workers who did not pay union dues. The union responded by saying the company was misconstruing facts and that they were determined to remain on strike until their demands were met. On December 8, a letter signed by about 500 authors, including Kwame Alexander, Barbara Kingsolver, and Jacqueline Woodson, was sent to Murray and HarperCollins children's book executive Suzanne Murphy that expressed solidarity with the strikers and said that, until the strike ended, they would not be considering HarperCollins as a publisher for any of their works. On December 16, the union held a rally outside of 195 Broadway that was headlined by several authors, including R. F. Kuang. Around the same time, a survey conducted of 215 literary agents by the Association of American Literary Agents showed that about 79.1 percent of respondents expressed some level of support for the strike, compared to less than 1 percent who were opposed. 58 days into the strike, one union member reported having walked 308,500 steps on the picket line, or approximately 105 miles.

On January 26, 2023, the union and company announced that they had agreed to enter into mediation conducted by the Federal Mediation and Conciliation Service, with both sides expressing optimism that the process could help resolve lingering disagreements. However, on January 31, several days before the two sides were to commence with mediation, the company announced that they would be cutting 5 percent of their North American workforce, citing continuing cost-cutting measures as with their firings last year. Brudastova stated that the union had not been informed of this beforehand and that they were investigating the impact it would have on Local 2110. Following mediation, on the night of February 9, the union and company announced that they had reached a tentative agreement to end the strike. Reporting on the deal, The Washington Post stated that the union was expected to submit the details of the agreement to its members the following day and would schedule a vote later that week.

Under the terms of the proposed contract, which would run until December 31, 2025, the company agreed to raise starting salaries from $45,000 to $47,500 upon ratification of the contract, with the amount increasing to $48,500 by the start of 2024 and to $50,000 by the start of 2025. Additionally, current union members would receive a one-time bonus payment of $1,500, and union members making less than $60,000 per year could file for two hours per week of overtime without first getting managerial approval. Union members would also be allowed to continue to work remotely until July 2023, when they had to return to work in office as other, nonunion employees do. The contract would also create a committee composed of both union and management members "to discuss issues of concern to either party" and would require the company to provide a "welcome letter" from the union in job packets given to eligible new hires. On February 16, union members voted to approve the contract and return to work on February 21.

== Aftermath ==
Lasting about 3 months, the strike was the longest in Local 2110's history, and in general, the terms of the contract were viewed favorably by the union members. In addition, Stephanie Guerdan, an associate editor and shop steward for Local 2110, stated that she believed the agreement would have ripple effects across the industry as a whole, saying, "We’ve already made a difference in the publishing industry because this month Macmillan and Hachette both raised their entry-level salaries to $47,500. And I am definitely drawing a direct line between fear of organizing at their houses and these raises". A 2023 article in Publishers Weekly similarly stated that the strike could lead to higher wages for the industry, but stated that it could hurt small press operators by setting "unrealistic financial expectations", further stating that, while the publishing industry saw large growths during the pandemic, the industry as a whole continued to operate with a small profit margin.

== See also ==
- Strikes during the COVID-19 pandemic
