= Verizon strike of 2016 =

Labor action in the United States

The 2016 Verizon workers' strike was a labor action in the United States involving about 40,000 Verizon Communications landline and Verizon Fios workers. The strike, which began April 13, was organized by trade unions International Brotherhood of Electrical Workers and the Communications Workers of America, and represents the biggest labor action in the United States since the Verizon strike of 2011 when 45,000 workers walked out. Picket lines were established along the East Coast of the United States, from Virginia to Massachusetts. A tentative agreement to end the strike was announced Friday, May 27.

Verizon workers had been without a contract since August 2015 due to a disagreement about support services being outsourced to call centers in the Philippines, Mexico, and the Dominican Republic, a cap placed on pensions, and cuts to their benefits. Nearly all Verizon Wireless workers are nonunionized.

Union leaders refused to accept a new contract citing multiple issues, including pensions, healthcare, work assignments, job security, and wages. According to Verizon, employees received $130,000 a year in wages and benefits. Union leaders claimed that the average total was $74,000 a year. Verizon offered workers a 7.5 percent salary increase. Union leaders responded by stating that the increase would be negated because workers would have to pay an increased amount for deductibles and premiums, prescriptions, and co-pays.

== Consequences ==
Due to a backlog in new installations, financial analysts projected that it would cost the company approximately $200 million in profits, with a loss of $343 million in revenue from its wireline division in its second quarter. Verizon has advertised for and hired a large number of replacement workers in response. Verizon also forced their full time employees to perform the striking members duties, training them for the various jobs at the National Conference Center in Virginia. Employees were assigned specific roles at random. If an employee did not wish to partake, they were fired.

There were several minor clashes between strikers and strikebreakers. In one incident a strikebreaker drew a large knife while confronting a picketer and was arrested by police. However, officials at Verizon claimed that replacement technicians were harassed and intimidated by striking workers. In one incident, the car of a striker collided with another being driven by a strikebreaker.

Sanders speaking in support of strikers on April 27, 2016

== Support from Democratic Party candidates ==
Both of the Democratic Party's candidates for president in 2016, Bernie Sanders and Hillary Clinton, spoke in support of the strikers. In April, Sanders joined a picket line in New York City and gave a speech praising the workers for having the "courage" to strike. However, Clinton received criticism for being paid a $225,000 fee by Verizon for giving a 2013 speech, as well as accepting $100,000 to $250,000 into the Clinton Foundation.

== See also ==
- Verizon strike of 2000
