= 1927 Indiana bituminous strike =

Strike by American coal miners

The 1927 Indiana bituminous strike was a strike by members of the United Mine Workers of America (UMWA) against local bituminous coal companies. Although the struggle raged throughout most of the nation's coal fields, its most serious impact was in western Pennsylvania, including Indiana County. The strike began on April 1, 1927, when almost 200,000 coal miners struck the coal mining companies operating in the Central Competitive Field, after the two sides (management and labor) could not reach an agreement on pay rates. The UMWA was attempting to retain pay raises gained in the contracts it had negotiated in 1922 and 1924, while management, stating that it was under economic pressure from competition with the West Virginia coal mines, was seeking wage reductions. The strike proved to be a disaster for the union, as by 1929, there were only 84,000 paying members of the union, down from 400,000 which belonged to the union in 1920.

== Background ==
The coal industry in the United States was at the end of three decades of growth in 1920, during which production had increased five-fold. The UMWA had won pay hikes and a shorter work day in 1919, and preserved these gains in contracts with mine operators in 1922 and 1924. However demand, which had been artificially inflated during the World War, dropped off at the war's end. This, combined with a stagnation of coal usage through conservation efforts during the 1920s led to efforts to reduce costs by the mine operators. Coal miners and the United Mine Workers faced an extended crisis as coal operators sought cost reductions and pressured unionized miners to accept wage cutbacks to below the previously agreed upon rate of $7.50 per day, and even to abandon the union.

In 1921, miners had struck against the Clearfield Bituminous Coal Corporation in Rossiter, Pennsylvania. The strike arose when the company began to require their employees to punch a time clock. The miners refused to comply, and were backed up by the UMWA, stating that the union's permission was required to enforce the time-clock requirement, in addition to the fact that no other mine in the district employed the use of a time clock. The strike lasted approximately one month, and ended when work resumed with the time clock in use. Northern coal mining operators, looking to reduce costs, blamed their weakened competitive position on the high and inflexible wage rates negotiated by the union. Attempts to impose significant wage reductions, in some cases up to 50 percent, were met by a bitter strike in 1922. This strike was not only about wages, but over the concept of national versus district contracts. The union wanted a national contract, while the mining operators wanted contracts by districts. That strike lasted five months, but led to the Jacksonville agreement in 1924, wherein miners were given a $7.50 per day rate which had been agree upon in the 1920 negotiations. When the northern operators continued to lose market share to their southern counterparts, they asked the union for a renegotiation of the Jacksonville scale. Union President John L. Lewis refused on the grounds that the industry was undergoing a needed adjustment which, when completed, would result in fewer men and fewer mines and a stable, more prosperous industry.

The coal mining area around Pittsburgh had always been a difficult territory for the UMWA. The presence of the nonunion Connellsville and Westmoreland fields made it difficult for the union to hold its ground, and the diverse ethnic groups which comprised the work force made organization and collective action difficult. It was in this district where the operators took their first stand against the union. In August, 1925, the Pittsburgh Coal Company, largest in the district, closed down, rejected the Jacksonville agreement, and reopened on a nonunion basis. Numerous other companies followed its lead. In all, some 110 mines in Pennsylvania changed from union to nonunion operation during 1925. This led to another strike over wages in 1925, which also lasted five months.

== The strike ==
The expiration of the Jacksonville Agreement, as well as the widespread violation of its terms by operators, gave urgency to the issue of negotiating a new agreement in 1927. Union representatives were charged to negotiate the best possible wage agreement possible as long as there was no reduction in wages. In February 1927 the union representatives met with representatives of the mining operators in Miami. The operators requested a reduction of the Jacksonville scale as well as union acceptance of the principle that wages should be tied to the changing price of coal. No agreement was reached in Miami, which led the union leadership to begin planning for a nationwide strike. The American Federation of Labor, responding to a plea from John L. Lewis (the head of the UMWA), passed a resolution which called on its affiliated international unions to help the coal miners. When the Coolidge administration refused to intervene in the dispute, Secretary of Labor James J. Davis could not get the major coal operators to agree to go back to the negotiating table with the UMWA.

On April 1, 1927, 40,000 coal miners struck in the Central Competitive Field, beginning the largest coal strike since 1922, they were supported by another 45,000 miners throughout Pennsylvania and over another 100,000 miners nationwide. The 1927 strike was one of the longest and most bitter strikes in Pennsylvania coal-industry history. The walk-out effectively closed down all mining activity in the bituminous fields of western Pennsylvania. As time passed, other miners joined the strike, particularly those who worked for the Clearfield Bituminous Coal Corporation, in Rossiter, Pennsylvania, which became the focal point for the entire strike.

From the outset the striking miners endured intense hardships. The operators used strikebreakers, private police, injunctions, and many other antiunion tactics which had been developed during a century of industrial conflict in America. Owners also evicted 12,000 miners and their families from company housing between July and December, 1927. The miners in Rossiter began to agitate, marching to other mines and encouraging their workers to join the strike.

In a major setback for the union, the company brought in strikebreakers and reopened the Rossiter mine in September, on a non-union basis with most of its employees recruited from outside the district and paid on the lower 1917 scale. A further, and much greater setback for the unions occurred in November, when Judge Jonathan Langham, serving on the Court of Common Pleas of Indiana County, Pennsylvania, published several sweeping injunctions against the protesters, putting a halt to their collective activities. The injunction forbade picketing, marching or gathering for meetings or rallies. It prohibited the disbursement of union funds for use by striking miners. The order also forbade newspaper advertisements and other means of communication being used to aid the cause of the strikers and convincing miners to desist from work. But it was his final injunction which brought national attention to the conflict in Pennsylvania: He issued a prohibition against singing hymns and holding church services on the last two pieces of property in Rossiter not owned by the mining operators: lots owned by the Magyar Presbyterian Church situated directly opposite the mouth of the mine.

The publicity spawned by Langham's injunction attracted out-of-state journalists, and a United States Senate investigating committee that came to Rossiter in February 1928. The senators, who included Senator Robert Wagner of New York, heard testimony from Rossiter miners, company officials, and Langham, and pointedly questioned the judge and company attorneys about the injunction's marker denial of civil liberties and free speech. The company continued to import strikebreakers and rely on Coal and Iron Police, and by the end of August virtually every Rossiter-area mine operated on a non-union basis. In October 1928 the national strike officially ended in a major defeat for the UMWA.

== Aftermath ==
The strike proved to be a disaster for the union. By 1929 only about 84,000 miners were paying dues. The central competitive field, the heart of the union's strength, was lost. Wage rates in the industry declined from an average of $7.50 to $5.50 per day. The work force in Pennsylvania declined by 21 percent.

The national strike and events in Rossiter, however, had telling effects on Senator Wagner, bolstering his sympathy for labor. Allied with Senator George Norris and Congressman Fiorello La Guardia, Wagner co-sponsored the Norris-La Guardia Act of 1932, which greatly restricted the use of labor injunctions.

In 1933 Wagner sponsored the National Industrial Recovery Act (NIRA), which called for collective bargaining between unions and management. This act enabled the UMWA to resume its growth with membership reaching 400,000 in 1934. In 1935, after the United States Supreme Court invalidated the NIRA, Wagner sponsored the National Labor Relations Act, which reinstated the NIRA's collective bargaining provisions and established the National Labor Relations Board to hold union elections and prevent unfair labor practices. Also in 1935, the US Senator from Pennsylvania sponsored the Guffey Coal Conservation Act. This measure, enacted in 1935, regulated the price and marketing structure of coal industry with provisions which guaranteed collective bargaining. It also stipulated uniform scales of wages and hours and created a national commission which would fix prices and regulate production.
