= 2007–2008 CBS News writers strike =

U.S. television labor dispute

The 2007–2008 CBS News writers strike is a strike action by news writers working for the U.S.-based news broadcaster CBS News. The strike began on November 19, 2007. In addition to CBS News, CBS's locally owned and operated station news operations (including CBS Radio's news radio stations like WCBS, WBBM, KYW and KNX) have been without a contract with the network since April 2005. While most news writers are members of the American Federation of Television and Radio Artists, a labor union representing workers in the entertainment industry, CBS News and CBS-owned news station employees are represented by the Writers Guild of America. On November 19, 2007, employees voted to authorize strike action along with the rest of the guild. Democratic presidential candidates John Edwards, Hillary Clinton, Barack Obama, Chris Dodd, Joe Biden and Bill Richardson said they would not cross picket lines for appearances on interview shows or a candidate debate.

On January 9, 2008, the WGAE and CBS News struck a tentative deal. On January 24, the WGA announced that its members had voted to ratify the contract, which runs to April 1, 2010.
