= 1946 Westinghouse Electric strike =

Pittsburgh, Pennsylvania labor strike

The 1946 Westinghouse Electric strike was work stoppage by Westinghouse Electric Corporation workers beginning on 15 January 1946. 75 000 workers participated. On 6 March, the Pennsylvania State Police were called in to break up a picket line of 2000 workers in Pittsburgh after a fight broke out between the striking workers and supervisors of the Westinghouse east Pittsburgh plant. The strike ended in mid-May 1946, after 115 days, with an agreement to raise wages by 18 and a half cents an hour. The strike cost Westinghouse over 42 million dollars.
