= 2019 Alaska ferry workers' strike =

Strike on the Alaska Marine Highway

2019 Alaska ferry workers strike
- Date: July 24 – August 2, 2019
- Location: Alaska
- Goals: Increased wages; Improved working conditions
- Result: New three-year labor contract between the IBU and the AMH

Parties
- Inlandboatmen's Union of the Pacific (IBU)
- Alaska Marine Highway (AMH)
~430 ferry workers

The 2019 Alaska ferry workers strike was a labor strike involving workers on the Alaska Marine Highway. Starting July 24, the strike involved over 400 members of the Inlandboatmen's Union of the Pacific, with the main causes of the strike being issues regarding scheduling, working conditions, and wage increases. The strike ended on August 2 following Federal mediation, with a compromise agreement between the union and ferry service.

== Background ==
Map of the Alaska Marine Highway

The Alaska Marine Highway (AMH) is a ferry service operated by the U.S. state of Alaska. Along with the state capital of Juneau, the AMH services many areas of Alaska where the only means of transportation is by air travel or sea travel, such as Kodiak Island. The largest union representing workers on the AMH is the Inlandboatmen's Union of the Pacific (IBU), an affiliated union of the International Longshore and Warehouse Union, which represents approximately 430 ferry workers. In 2017, the employment contract between the union and AMH expired, with union members continuing to work under interim agreements as the union and AMH entered negotiations for new contracts. However, negotiations stalled as neither side could come to an agreement over issues including scheduling, wage increases, and working conditions. In particular, the union sought a 9% annual wage increase spread out over three years, as well as increased state funding for workers' health insurance and the elimination of a rule that allowed the AMH to pay out-of-state workers less than Alaskans. By July 2019, with no agreement reached under either Governors Bill Walker or Mike Dunleavy, the union moved towards a strike. A 2019 contract proposal by the state government that did not include wage increases was rejected by union members, who then voted to authorize a strike. On July 23, the government of Alaska sent a letter to IBU officials stating that a strike by the state employees would most likely not be protected under state collective bargaining laws, with union officials responding that they were acting legally. On July 24, the union announced a strike. This was the first strike experienced by the AMH since a 20-day strike by the IBU in 1977.

== Course of the strike ==
On July 24, about 420 union members walked off their post. Pilots and engineers, represented by the International Organization of Masters, Mates & Pilots and the Marine Engineers' Beneficial Association, respectively, did not participate in the strike, but agreed to not cross picket lines for the duration of the strike. On July 26, 2020 Democratic Party presidential candidates Joe Biden and Bernie Sanders voiced their support for the strikers. On July 27, union and state officials met with an arbitrator from the Federal Mediation and Conciliation Service to discuss an end to the strike. However, by July 29, the mediator had suspended discussions.

The state's negotiating team was led by Commissioner of the Department of Administration, Kelly Tshibaka, who argued that higher wages translate into less money to run the system, and the union eased its stance on pay hikes, which helped to end the strike. On August 3, an agreement between the two parties was reached, with representatives of the state announcing a return to operations starting the next day.

== Outcomes ==
Over the course of the strike, over 8,500 passengers and almost 2,500 vehicles were affected. The strike cost the AMH between $3.2 and $3.3 million in lost revenue and reimbursements to customers. As part of the agreement, the IBU and AMH agreed to a three-year labor contract that included a 3% pay increase spread over 2020 and 2021. Union members would start paying into their health insurance programs starting in 2021, with increased coverage. Additionally, union members would no longer be required to pay out-of-pocket for hotel rooms while working. However, the union failed to amend the rule allowing the AMH to pay out-of-state workers less than Alaskan residents.

== Bibliography ==
- Brooks, James (July 24, 2019). "All Alaska ferry service suspended as largest shipboard union strikes for first time since 1977". Anchorage Daily News.
- Rapier, Graham (July 30, 2019). "Alaska's 'Marine Highway' connecting dozens of towns that have no road access has been shut down for nearly a week because of a worker strike, leaving thousands of passengers stranded". Business Insider. Axel Springer SE.
- Resneck, Jacob (July 25, 2019a). "IBU strike shuts down Alaska ferries". Alaska Public Media.
- Resneck, Jacob (August 8, 2019b). "Alaska ferry workers union explains why strike happened — and what workers gained from it". KTOO-TV.
- Rosen, Yereth (August 2, 2019). "Alaska Labor Deal Reached to End 10-Day Ferry Strike". U.S. News & World Report.
- Zak, Annie (July 27, 2019a). "Ferry workers' union, state meet with federal mediator to discuss contract". Anchorage Daily News.
- Zak, Annie (July 29, 2019b). "Alaska ferry workers strike continues with union, state 'working through' issues". Anchorage Daily News.
