= 1935 Pacific Northwest lumber strike =

Pacific Northwest Lumber Strike
- Date: April 26, 1935 – August 15, 1935

Parties
Lumber workers	ㅤ

Number
30,000	

The 1935 Pacific Northwest lumber strike was an industry-wide labor strike organized by the Northwest Council of Sawmill and Timber Workers' Union (STWU). The strike lasted for more than three and a half months and paralyzed much of the lumber industry in Northern California, Oregon and Washington state. Although the striking workers only achieved part of their demands, the repercussions of the long and often violent strike were felt for decades. Over the next several years, a newly radicalized and militant generation of lumber workers would go on to spark several more industry-wide strikes.

== Background ==
The 1935 lumber strike had its roots in the rapidly changing political and economic circumstances of the Great Depression. Beginning with the stock market crash of 1929, the first few years of the 1930s witnessed staggering economic decline and widespread unemployment. Workers from every industry suffered, including those in the lumber industry, who were subjected to declining wages, longer hours and employer oppression. The collapse of the national economy led to a decline in home building and other construction, leaving the logging companies without a market for their lumber. The once highly profitable Pacific Northwest logging companies found themselves in desperate straits.

In 1932, seeing the deepening national economic crisis, the newly elected President Franklin Roosevelt began to implement a series of economic reforms as part of his New Deal to pull the American people out of economic depression. In August 1933, Roosevelt's enacted the National Recovery Administration (NRA) Lumber Code. This was a program designed to set prices for lumber products as well as set new rules mandating a forty-hour workweek and 42.5 cents/hour minimum wage for West Coast logger. This, coupled with other pro-labor legislation of the Roosevelt Administration, emboldened lumber workers to push for union recognition and collective bargaining rights.

Parallel to the efforts of the federal government were the union organizing efforts of both the American Labor Federation (AFL) and the radical Communist Party. In July 1933, one month before the NRA Lumber Code took effect, the AFL had organized the Northwest Council of the Sawmill and Timber Workers Union (STWU) to act as a union for all Pacific Northwest lumber workers. Though primarily a conservative, craft-oriented union, the Sawmill and Timber Workers Union contained many Communist and militant elements within its ranks. For their part, the Communist Party USA had been successfully building support among many lumber workers and staging wildcat strikes at lumber mills throughout the region as early as 1930. Employers feared that " a conflict with labor would bring on a revolutionary situation".

This "revolutionary situation" came to a head at a meeting of the STWU on March 23, 1935 in Aberdeen, WA. Encouraged, but unsatisfied with changes enacted under recent NRA lumber code, the union made demands for a "six hour day, five day work-week, 75 cents/hour minimum wage, seniority system, paid holidays, and that the STWU be the sole collective bargaining agent for timber workers". They also declared that if these demands were not meet by the employers, the STWU would call for an industry wide strike on May 6 of that year.

The stage was set for what would become known as the Great Lumber Strike of 1935.

== Strike timeline ==
The days leading up to the strike deadlines revealed a lack of willingness on the part of the lumber companies to give in to union demands, especially on the matter of union recognition. Beginning on April 26, with negotiations failing, workers at the Bloedel-Donovan mill in Bellingham, WA went out on strike. On the next few days, workers in Olympia and Portland also went out on strike ahead of the official deadline. Although some companies conceded on modest wage increases, the majority of union demands remained unmet, and on May 6 lumber workers across the Pacific Northwest walked off the job. The Seattle Post-Intelligencer and Seattle Daily Times both reported that over 10,000 workers went on strike. Already by the first day, the strike was one of the largest in the history of the region.

By the middle of May, 90 percent of the Northwest industry's capacity was shut down and 30,000 workers walked the picket lines. With the situation becoming desperate, the employers asked Washington Governor Clarence Martin to call in the National Guard and state police to control the strikers in Tacoma. Similar measures were taken throughout Western Washington, Oregon and Northern California. Confrontations broke out almost immediately as strikers clashed with police, National Guardsmen and scabs. Clashes turned violent in Humboldt County, CA when three Finnish lumber workers were shot by police and strikebreakers outside of the Holmes-Eureka lumber mill on June 21. Striking cook Wilhelm Kaarte was killed right away; striking Pacific Lumber Co. employee Harold Edlund was wounded attempting to aid Kaarte, and died on the 25th; 19-year-old bystander Paul Lampella died on August 7.

On June 24, National Guardsmen attacked over 2,000 union workers barring the entry of strikebreakers into the Tacoma lumber mills. Known as the "Battle in Tacoma", this action prompted both the union and the employers to seek the mediation of the Roosevelt Administration.

Fearing further violence and exhausted after heated street battles with national guardsmen and police, and aided by the mediation of the Roosevelt Administration, the STWU voted to end the strike in mid-July, with the last striking workers returning to work on August 15. In the end, the employers conceded little to the union. Lumber companies agreed to modest wage increases and a shorter workweek but refused to concede the issue of union recognition. The dramatic union efforts had ultimately ended in disappointment.

== Aftermath ==
Although little was ultimately gained by the dramatic strike, the STWU had won a tremendous moral victory. Forged in the heat of the battle with the police, strikebreakers and the National Guard, strikers saw the potential effectiveness of militant strikes and became more confident in their ability to negotiate with the employers on equal grounds. As Phil Weyerhaeuser of the Weyerhaeuser lumber company stated, "I do not think we can refuse recognition of the union in some way in the future". Organized labor had come to the lumber industry and the over the next few years, several more strikes and organizing efforts would slowly wear down the employers' opposition to union recognition.

Angered by the lack of militancy and support displayed by the AFL during the 1935 strike, lumber workers began to reject the conservative craft unionism of the AFL and in 1937, the International Woodworkers of America (IWA) was formed as an industrial union under the newly created Congress of Industrial Organizations. Under the guidance of the CIO and the IWA, the lumber workers won increased wages and benefits, and perhaps most significantly union recognition.

== See also ==
- List of worker deaths in United States labor disputes
