= 1983 Greyhound Bus Lines strike in Seattle =

1983 bus drivers strike

The Greyhound Bus Lines Strike of 1983 in Seattle was part of a nationwide seven-week-long strike of the members of the Amalgamated Transit Union working for Greyhound Bus Lines. In Seattle, 175 drivers and terminal workers who were represented by ATU locals 1384 and 1055 walked off the job at 11pm on November 2, 1983. In total, more than 70 daily incoming and outgoing trips were cancelled in Seattle.

== Deregulation and Competition ==
Several significant events acted as compounding catalysts for the strike of 1983. Among them were a series of federal deregulations of the transportation industry in the 1970s and 80's and an increase in competition from Greyhound's main competitor Trailways as well as from smaller newer market entries.

=== Airline Deregulation Act of 1978 ===
On October 24, 1978, the 95th congress signed the Airline Deregulation Act of 1978. Like the Federal Bus Regulatory Reform Act of 1982, this law allowed airlines greater control over its operations and increased the market ease of entry for entrepreneurs. This had the sum effect of reducing airline fares to the point they became competitive with bus fares. For example, both People Express and Southwest Airlines were able to charge less than Greyhound for many destinations.

=== Federal Bus Regulatory Reform Act of 1982 ===
On September 20, 1982, the 97th congress enacted into law the Bus Regulatory Reform Act. The law deregulated many aspects of the bus industry, most noticeably by reducing restrictions on bus lines to add or remove stops and by increasing the ease of entry of entrepreneurs into the bus service market. Shortly following the enactment of the new law, the Interstate Commerce Commission received over 2000 applications to operate new bus services. Congress had been heavily lobbied by members of the bus industry to approve deregulation and Greyhound Bus Lines itself had insisted that some of its managers write letters to Congress in support of the bill.

=== Bus Competition ===
In 1982, the Amalgamated Transit Union agreed to a wage freeze of its members working for Trailways Bus Lines. Trailways' future was threatened financially and the ATU accepted the freeze in order to keep its members employed. With lower labor costs, Trailways was able to better compete, and over the course of the next months ridership fell considerably for Greyhound Bus Lines. At the same time, Greyhound was losing business to small new market entries such as Rohrer Bus Lines on the East Coast. Trailways also had affiliates nationwide who would carry the Trailways logo but were actually small independent companies. By the middle of 1983, Greyhound had reported 34 million dollars in operating losses from the previous two years. Greyhound blamed this loss in revenue to their comparably higher labor cost; 62% as opposed to 40% for its competitors.

== The Seattle Strike Timeline ==
=== Contract Negotiations between Greyhound and the ATU ===
In 1983, as a response to increasing competition and decreasing revenue, Greyhound Bus Lines came to the negotiating table with a 9.5% pay reduction and additional benefit reduction for drivers and terminal workers resulting in an overall compensation reduction of 17% to 25%. The ATU rejected this proposal and ended negotiations on October 31, 1983.

=== Drivers walk off the job (November 2, 1983) ===
On November 2, 1983 at 11pm, after 48 hours of notice, 175 Greyhound bus drivers and terminal workers who were members of ATU L1384 and ATU L1055 walked off the job. Picket lines were set at the terminal on 8th avenue and Stewart St. and at the maintenance garage at 1250 Denny Way. The picketers headquartered themselves at the Camlin Hotel in Downtown Seattle.

=== ATU L587 honors Greyhound Strike (November 7, 1983) ===
While workers from L587 did not walk off the job, they vowed support for their fellow ATU workers.

=== Greyhound Ultimatum (November 8, 1983) ===
Greyhound Bus Lines sent a letter to the union telling workers it must decide whether or not they would be returning to work by Monday November 14, or else they would be replaced by new hires. At this point, 45,000 job applicants had already been interviewed nationwide.

=== Greyhound offers half price fares (November 15, 1983) ===
Greyhound Bus lines announced half price fares would be in effect between November 17 and December 15. Strike negotiations remained at an impasse with Greyhound rejecting a 3 year pay freeze offered by the ATU.

=== First sign of violence (November 15, 1983) ===
A day after the return to work deadline, a picketer was struck by a vehicle being driven by a non-striking Greyhound mechanic. Fault remained undetermined, and the picketer did not suffer life-threatening injuries.

=== Violence erupts (November 17, 1983) ===
200 strikers confronted the first Greyhound bus to depart from Seattle since the strike began. The bus was being driven by a non union driver and was heading to Portland. 15 police officers clashed with picketers while police in riot gear stood by. The bus suffered damage to its headlights and windshield wipers.

=== Strike Ends (December 3rd, 1983 - December 20th, 1983) ===
On December 3, 1983, Union leaders and Greyhound Bus Lines reached a tentative agreement to end the strike. The agreement reduced wages by 7.8% instead of the originally proposed 9.5%. In addition, workers took a 4% cut in pension benefits and accepted a new pay schedule that compensated new hires at 20 to 25% less than before. On December 19, 1983, the TA was ratified by the membership, and workers returned to work the next day.

== Effect on Rural Communities of Washington state ==
During the strike, rural towns, like the city of Ephrata, in Eastern Washington were hardest hit by the Seattle strike because there were no alternative forms of public transportation. Shortly after the strike began, Greyhound Bus Lines announced that it would drop service to 1325 rural communities nationwide and in Washington state; by December 2, 1983, 4 rural bus routes were cancelled. The routes were Olympia to Toledo, Vancouver to Maryhill, Colfax to Rosalia and Ephrata to Spokane. Earlier in the year the Washington State Utilities and Transportation Commission had denied requests stating that the affected communities did not have meaningful alternatives to Greyhound Bus Services. After deregulation of the industry, the Interstate Commerce Commission approved reduction of service to these areas.

== Greyhound Continues to Operate During Strike ==
The day after the strike began, about 20,000 people went to Greyhound offices around the country to replace the 12,500 striking ATU workers. Over the course of three days, 500 applications were submitted in Seattle alone. During this time, Trailways, Greyhound's competitor, had an 800 percent increase in bus business in Seattle alone. By November 17, 1983 Greyhound buses were rolling again from the Seattle terminal.

== Aftermath ==
The strike signaled the start of a slow decline of the bus industry in general and Greyhound specifically. 1984 was marked by 1500 layoffs, and the year afterwards Greyhound sold 120 terminals and laid off an additional 2000 employees. Many of its routes were then franchised to smaller competitors. After acquiring Trailways and absorbing 1400 of their employees, a round of negotiations in 1989 ended with another strike in June 1990. More violent than the last, the strike of 1990 saw shootings and bomb threats and the death of a picketer. This strike lasted until 1993.
