= 1955–1956 Westinghouse strike =

1955–1956 nationwide labor strike

During the 1955–1956 Westinghouse strike, around 55,000 members of the United Electrical Workers (UE) and the International Union of Electrical Workers (IUEW) from 40 different Westinghouse plants in multiple states went on strike over wages and the terms of their union contract. At first, around 46,000 workers from 30 different plants walked off the job on October 17, 1955; then on October 25, another 9,000 workers from 10 plants joined them. Immediately after the first wave, Westinghouse's production was halved.

On March 20, 1956, after a 156 day nationwide strike, the unions reached a settlement with Westinghouse, and most of the strikers went back to work. The New York Times noted that the strike was "the longest major walkout in more than twenty years", with Westinghouse losing up to $300 million (equivalent to $3.55 billion in 2025) in sales.

However, one local UE union in Lester, Pennsylvania continued to strike for an additional five months; the members of the Lester union, UE Local 107, demanded that the company abandon its plan to cut the workers' pay by 20 percent. During the strike, the union mobilized a local mutual aid network and raised thousands of dollars of food from the community. They were also endorsed by five congressmen from Philadelphia. In August 1956, UE Local 107 reached a settlement with Westinghouse. The extended Lester strike cost Westinghouse an estimated $75 million (equivalent to $888 million in 2025).
