= Side letter =

Type of collective bargaining agreement

A side letter, or side agreement, is a collective bargaining agreement that is not part of the underlying or primary collective bargaining agreement (CBA) but is used by the parties to the contract to reach agreement on issues that the CBA does not cover, to clarify issues in the CBA or to modify the CBA (permanently or temporarily). One may distinguish side letters from "side settlements", or "settlement agreements", which settle a dispute arising from the underlying CBA. In rare cases, bargaining parties may use a side letter to adjust the focus of the contract if the parties are not yet ready or willing to adapt the contract formally.

Under the law of contracts, a side letter has the same force as the underlying contract. However, the courts may invalidate side letters in conflict with the main collective bargaining agreement. The terms of the CBA govern interpretation of side letters. In the United States, several appellate courts have held that in disputes on which side letters do not contain conflict resolution procedures, the parties must use the underlying collective bargaining agreement's dispute resolution mechanism (in these cases, arbitration) to resolve the dispute.

The range of issues side letters covers is wide. In some cases, side letters have driven national labour law policy. For example, in the United States, a side letter guaranteeing employer neutrality during union elections in newly-acquired plants, subsidiaries, or divisions led to a federal lawsuit over the legality of the agreement in 2002 and to a major decision by the National Labor Relations Board that revised federal labour policy in 2007.

In Australia, side letters are becoming increasingly common due to the changes in federal labour law that the WorkChoices Act created. It limits the collective bargaining agreements that parties can register for eligibility for workplace tribunals enforcement and also requires CBAs to be strictly limited to work-related issues. The inclusion of even minor non-workplace-related clauses (such as dues check-off) can render a CBA unenforceable. In response, many unions and employers use side letters to reach agreement on non-workplace-related matters and do not register the side letters with the federal government but rely on common law to enforce the side letters.
