= Santa Clara cannery strike =

1931 labor action in California

The Santa Clara cannery strike occurred during the summer of 1931. Workers spontaneously walked out of canneries in order to protest a 20% cut in wages. These workers were met with violence from local authorities, and strikebreakers were brought in to replace the workers. While this strike was unsuccessful, it marked the beginning of organizing cannery workers.

== Background ==
=== Cannery work in the 1920s ===
The California Santa Clara Valley, south of San Francisco, was the largest fruit growing and processing center in the world during the 1920s. Moreover, during this time, food processing was the largest United States industry in both labor size and product value. To illustrate the enormity of this industry, in 1929, canned and preserved foods accounted for two-thirds of the total quantity of United States manufactured goods. California specifically was producing virtually all of the nation's lemons, olives and apricots as well as seventy percent of its oranges, grapes, plums and nuts.

=== Cannery workers' demographics ===
In the 1920s prosperity led white workers to better paying jobs, leaving cannery positions to be filled by immigrants and people of color in the Santa Clara Valley. The labor force in this region's canneries included White, Portuguese (20%), Italian (50%) and Mexican workers. Cannery owners preferred women workers believing they were more adept at the preparation of the fruits and vegetables for canning. This included the ability to quickly sort, peel and cut the produce. These demographics determined the unionization of cannery workers. Additionally, the prevalence of women workers formed multiple demands during the strike.

=== Cannery working conditions ===
Cannery workers in Santa Clara fell prey to the seasonal nature of cannery work. In the 1930s a cannery would employ only 4,731 workers in February and up to 17,333 workers in August. Seasonal work also led to low annual income for cannery workers. In 1939, the average annual salary was under three hundred dollars. The seasonal nature of cannery work in Santa Clara required a large and adaptive labor force. These workers were migrant workers. Employees were paid on a piece rate system, meaning that their wages were set by how much work they completed. Many workers appreciated this system because the more work they completed, the higher they were paid. Ten- to twelve-hour workdays were standard in this industry. Cannery workers often suffered from infections. The acidity of the fruit caused skin to bleed and resulted in infections including blood poisoning. Canneries epitomized industrialized California agriculture. It involved repetitive and unskilled piecework. The set-up of cannery work subordinated people to machines. Migrant workers and seasonal work provided unstable working conditions for employees. Employers were harsh with workers.

== Causes of the strike ==
=== Context of the Great Depression ===
In the 1930s canned fruit was a luxury item and with the Great Depression, there was a reduction in canned goods. Therefore, there was a reduction in the production of canned goods and consequently for employee wages. The Great Depression also brought an onslaught on workers from the Great Plains. This increase in the labor force kept cannery workers from protesting against working conditions prior to 1931. Any dissident employee was easily replaceable, but was not guaranteed different job opportunities.

=== AWIU/CAWIU ===
The immigrant demographics of the cannery workers made the industry difficult to organize under unions. The American Federation of Labor (AFL) would not organize canneries because of their diverse work force and the use of immigrant labor. The Agricultural Workers Industrial Union (AWIU), an organization that was founded under the Trade Union Unity League established by the Communist Party of the U.S.A. It was organized with the goal to organize semi-skilled and unskilled workers that were being ignored by the AFL. However, The AWIU took on a passive method for forming unions.

== Timeline of events ==
In July 1931 cannery employers in the Santa Clara Valley called for a 20% cut in worker's wages. As a result, 2,000 workers spontaneously walked off the job. Immediately, the American Labor Union, a small independent union formed in early 1931 and mainly comprised on Italian cannery workers began to organize the strike. Quickly, the AUWIL took leadership, and spread the strike to over 16,000 Santa Clara cannery workers. The AWIU was not getting support from these strikers so they attempted to gain support by changing their name to the Cannery and Agricultural Workers' Industrial Union. The CAWIU solidified a set of demands for these workers including 1. An increase in wages by ten cents an hour 2. Time and a half for overtime 3. Free transportation for female employees 4. No employer discrimination against Union workers 5. Equal pay for equal work 6. Formal recognition of the union

On July 31, the strikers organized a rally in St. James Park in downtown San Jose. A platform was set up in the park and as each speaker came up, they were arrested. Finally, an unarmed woman reached the platform calling for a march to City Hall. There, they would demand the release of these protesters. This woman led the protesters on a march to city hall, but was suddenly struck in the face by a tear gas bomb and was knocked unconscious. Twenty strikers were taken into custody as protesters came head to head with Santa Clara Valley authorities unleashed night sticks and batons on these workers. American legion members were recruited to meet these protesters at the San Jose jail. There was a two-hour confrontation and the protesters were dispersed by the San Jose Fire Department.

On August 1, communists organized another rally in St. James Park. There, they protested wars in general, and specifically wars on protesters. There was no violence against the protesters this day. Newspapers reacted to the protests predicting a major revolution afoot. At the Richmond Case Cannery, where over 15,000 workers stepped out alone displayed machine guns at their entrances, warning protesters to stay away. Other cannery owners brought in scabs to replace strikers. Many people were out of work during this time and were willing to work for lesser pay. Within a few days, the strike dissolved with none of the workers’ demands met.

== Historical significance and aftermath ==
Although this strike did not result in employers acquiescing to worker demands, it marks a long-term trend toward unionizing cannery workers. Prior to this strike, cannery workers did not belong to unions or they were organized by small unions such as the American Labor Union. This strike set a precedent for unionizing. While support for the communist CAWIU did not last, cannery workers in Santa Clara, and throughout California, became organized under the AFL. Also, this strike was one of the first among agricultural workers. Workers’ unrest spread quickly to other groups of agricultural workers including pickers and processors throughout California.
