= 2019 AT&T strike =

The 2019 AT&T strike was a labor strike involving approximately 20,000 employees of AT&T across the Southern United States. Members of the Communications Workers of America (CWA) initiated the strike on August 24, 2019, after negotiations over new labor contracts stalled. The work stoppage affected operations in nine states and lasted until August 28, when a tentative agreement was reached between CWA and AT&T, leading to the strike's conclusion.

== Background ==
On August 3, 2019, employment contracts between 20,000 members of the Communications Workers of America (CWA) and AT&T Southeast were set to expire. These workers primarily consisted of customer service representatives and technicians from AT&T's wired phone and Internet division. Leading up to this, discussions between the two parties regarding future contract agreements were proving to be unfruitful, and leading up to the expirations the CWA began to prepare for the possibility of a labor strike. The previous month, members of the CWA voted to authorize a strike if an agreement regarding contracts could not be made. On August 3, hundreds of telecommunications workers held a rally outside AT&T Midtown Center (AT&T Southeast's headquarters) in Atlanta. On August 10, the workers began to work without a contract. A meeting on August 20 between AT&T and union officials again proved fruitless, with the union alleging that proposals by the company would have reduced paid sick time, among other unwanted effects.

== Course of the strike ==
On August 23, the CWA announced a strike that would begin at midnight. They also filed a charge with the National Labor Relations Board alleging that AT&T was not bargaining "in good faith" and that they had failed to send proper representatives to contract discussions. A day prior on August 21, CWA locals 3120, 3121 and 3122 went on a Unfair labor practice protest in South Florida and walked out over issues associated with violations of the National Labor Relations Act. However, these actions were unrelated to and did not prompt the mass strike the following day. In total, the strike involved workers in Alabama, Florida, Georgia, Kentucky, Louisiana, Mississippi, North Carolina, South Carolina, and Tennessee.

On August 25, Senator and 2020 Democratic Party Presidential candidate Bernie Sanders met with strikers in Louisville, Kentucky ahead of one of his campaign rallies. On August 28, following an agreement between CWA and AT&T, CWA announced the strike had ended and workers could return to their jobs that day. As part of the agreement, the two parties agreed to a 5-year contract that included increases in wages and enhancements for workers' 401(k) and pensions. In general, the agreement was considered to be favorable to the labor union.

== See also ==
- 1983 AT&T strike

== Bibliography ==
- Ballman, Makayla (August 25, 2019). "Bernie Sanders visits striking AT&T workers in Louisville". WAVE. Gray Television.
- Berlin, Carly (September 9, 2019). "20,000 AT&T workers in the South went on strike—and won". Scalawag.
- DiFurio, Dom (August 26, 2019). "Why 20,000 AT&T workers are on strike across the southeastern U.S." The Dallas Morning News. A. H. Belo. Archived from the original on September 25, 2019.
- Jeong, Yihyun (August 24, 2019). "AT&T workers on strike over 'unfair labor practices' across 9 states, including Tennessee". The Tennessean. Gannett.
- Kanell, Michael E. (July 29, 2019a). "AT&T employee contracts in Georgia expire Saturday as talks continue". The Atlanta Journal-Constitution. Cox Enterprises.
- Kanell, Michael E. (August 2, 2019b). "Union workers rally Saturday as AT&T contract deadline nears". The Atlanta Journal-Constitution. Cox Enterprises.
- Kanell, Michael E. (August 25, 2019c). "AT&T workers strike in Southeast: More than 20,000 walk out". The Atlanta Journal-Constitution. Cox Enterprises.
- Kanell, Michael E. (August 28, 2019d). "AT&T strike in Southeast ends on fifth day after deal on new contract". The Atlanta Journal-Constitution. Cox Enterprises.
- Kanell, Michael E. (August 30, 2019e). "Union contract with AT&T includes 13.25% pay hike". The Atlanta Journal-Constitution. Cox Enterprises.
- Pressman, Aaron (August 27, 2019). "Why 20,000 AT&T Workers Just Went on Strike". Fortune.
- Rodrigo, Chris Mills (August 26, 2019). "Bernie Sanders joins striking AT&T workers in Kentucky". The Hill.
- Staples, Gracie Bonds (August 3, 2019). "Southeast workers rally in Atlanta amid contract talks with AT&T". The Atlanta Journal-Constitution. Cox Enterprises.
- Thornton, William (August 28, 2019). "Union announces AT&T strike is over". AL.com. Advance Publications.
- "Over 20,000 AT&T workers in nine Southern states went on strike over the weekend". USA Today. Gannett. Associated Press. August 27, 2019.
