= Verizon strike of 2000 =

American telecom workers walkout

The Verizon strike 2000 took place on August 5, 2000, in New York. Nearly 85,000 unionized Verizon workers went on strike to protest Verizon's plan to shut down their factory and move to non-union areas.

== Strike ==
On August 5, 2000, 85,000 union workers walked out on Verizon and began to strike. There were two union groups that went on strike, the Communication Workers of America and the International Brotherhood of Electrical Workers. There were different reasons why the two union groups went on strike. The first reason was due to the merger of Bell Atlantic and GTE; these two companies merged and created Verizon. The problem with the merger was that Verizon had the idea to move their shops and factories to nonunion areas, which would mean workers either losing their jobs or being forced to relocate.

Extra hours added to mandatory overtime was another reason. On top of the already unbearable work and stress, workers were forced to work more hours during their already mandatory overtime. One worker described the workload as "a level of stress that can only be described by someone who handles more than 1,000 service calls in an eight-hour shift and is trying to cold-sell the callers $60,000 worth of extras—like three-way calling and Caller ID—each month."

== Impact ==
Although the strikes had little effects on Verizon, the strike did have a negative effect on competitors. The Verizon strike hurt competitive local exchange carriers (CLECs) that relied on Verizon to help with the connection of their new customers to the network. CLECs are valuable in the market for every new customer they bring in, so without help from union workers on strike, CLECs suffered.

Three days into the strike Verizon managers claimed to have counted 455 acts of vandalism, which they attributed to union members. Managers blamed unionists for throwing rocks, eggs, and bottles at workers and managers who crossed picket lines, as well as disrupting service by cutting cables and wires.

== Outcome ==
After 18 days of striking, the Verizon strike came to an end with the agreement that Verizon would cut some requirements from the workers' mandatory overtime. The new rules were workers are to work at least 7.5 hours of overtime a week, and the most overtime they can work is 10 hours. Also, workers who are bilingual and have to do jobs that require being fluent in another language are to be paid a little bit more than the average worker.

== See also ==
- Verizon strike of 2016
