= 2021 Virginia Volvo Trucks strike =

Labor strike in Dublin, Virginia, U.S.

- Date: April 17–30, 2021 (1 week and 6 days); June 7 – July 18, 2021 (1 month, 1 week and 4 days)
- Location: Dublin, Virginia, United States
- Caused by: Disagreements over terms of a new labor contract
- Methods: Picketing; Strike action
- Result: New labor contract includes signing bonus, increased wages, and other provisions

Parties
United Auto Workers Local 2069	Volvo Trucks

The 2021 Virginia Volvo Trucks strike was a labor strike involving workers at a Volvo Trucks production facility in Dublin, Virginia, United States. The strike began in April and ended in July with the ratification of a new labor contract.

Of the 3,300 workers at the plant, 2,900 were union members of the United Auto Workers (UAW) Local 2069. In March 2021, the labor contract between the union and company expired, and while the union authorized a 30-day extension while both sides continued to negotiate the terms of a replacement, neither side could come to an agreement, with disagreements primarily covering wage increases, job securities, and health care, among other issues. As a result, on April 17, Local 2069 commenced with strike action against the plant, with workers picketing outside while negotiations continued. On April 30, the strike was called off after UAW announced a tentative agreement had been reached with the company. However, members voted to overwhelmingly reject this agreement on May 16 and proceeded to reject a second tentative agreement on June 6. Following this, on June 7, strike action recommenced. About a month after this, on July 9, union members rejected a third tentative agreement that had been reached between UAW and Volvo Trucks. On July 11, the company declared an impasse and stated they would be reopening the plant, with the third tentative agreement serving as their final offer to the union. In a vote held on July 14, union members narrowly voted to accept the terms of the agreement, with strikers returning to work on July 18, thus ending the strike.

The terms of the new contract included a $2,000 signing bonus for most of the union members, a 12 percent annual wage increase over the six-year life of the contract, and a price freeze on health care premiums for the duration of the contract, among other provisions.

== Background ==
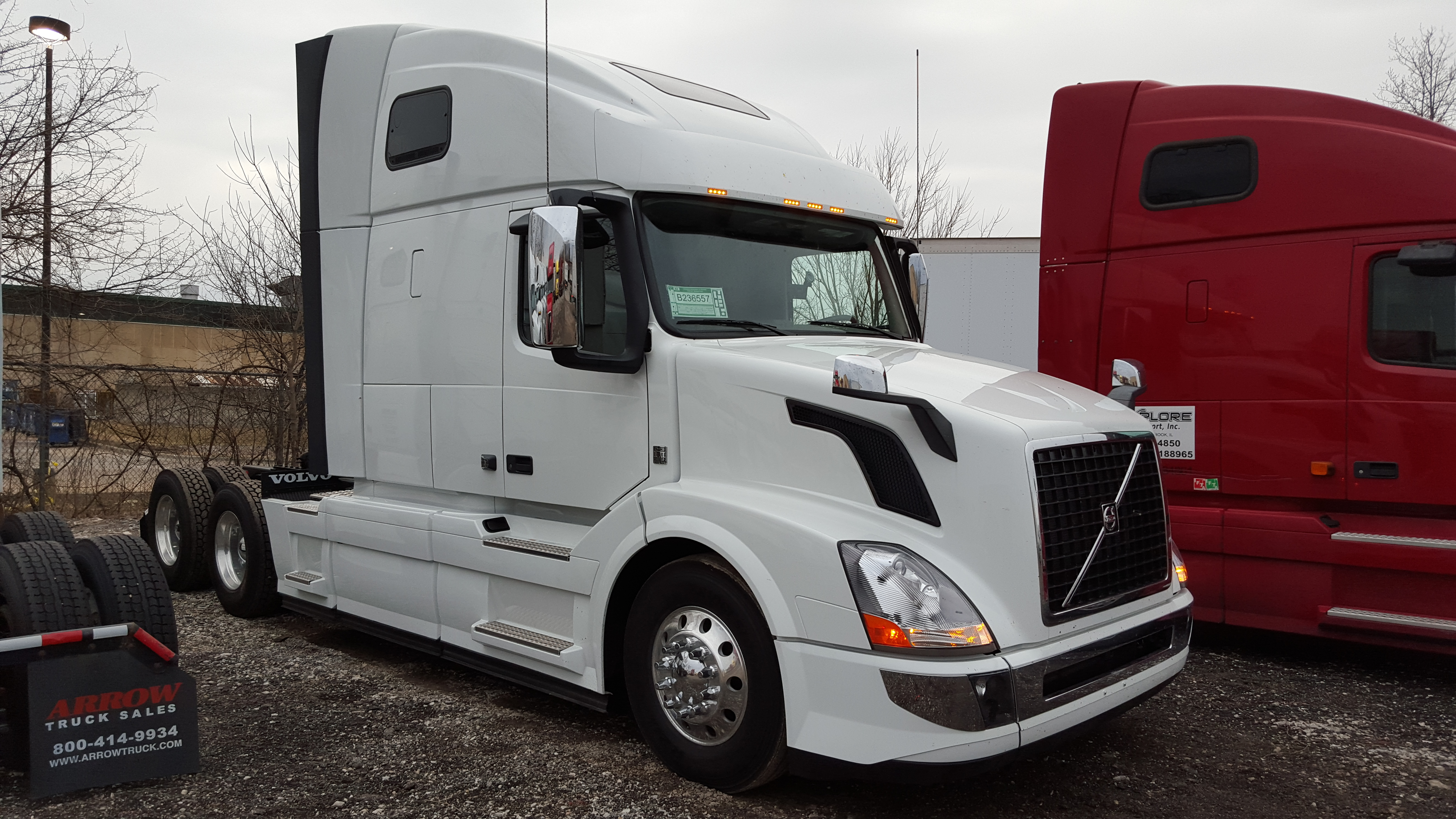
Volvo VNL, one of the truck models produced at the New River Valley Plant

Volvo Trucks, an international truck manufacturer, operates the New River Valley Plant in Dublin, Virginia. In 2021, this facility (one of the largest employers in Southwest Virginia and Volvo Trucks' largest plant) employed about 3,300 people, of whom about 2,900 were union members of the United Auto Workers Local 2069. The union and company had last agreed to a labor contract in 2016, with an expiration date of March 16, 2021. As a result, the company and union began negotiations for a new contract on February 8. The union stated that the company had not made "any substantial offer" for a replacement contract in the lead-up to this date and, subsequently, the union agreed to extend the contract for 30 days while negotiations between the two sides continued. However, the two sides had numerous points of contention that prevented an agreement from being reached. According to the union, these points of contention included "wage increases, job security, wage progression, skilled trades, shift premium, holiday schedules, work schedules, health and safety, seniority, pension, 401(k), health care and prescription drug coverage and overtime." At the time, the plant was undergoing a $400 million investment that included the addition of several hundred additional jobs and an expanded facility capable of producing newer products. The negotiations were occurring during the midst of a labor shortage caused by the COVID-19 pandemic.

== Course of the strike ==
=== First strike action ===
The strike began on April 17, with picketing commencing at a road intersection about halfway between the plant and the union building. Many held signs that read "UAW / On Strike / Unfair Labor Practice". Several local politicians met with strikers on the first day, while the union stated that negotiations could recommence on April 26. In response, the company issued a statement expressing disappointment in the union's actions and stated that they were still open to continuing negotiations. Several labor organizations voiced their support for the strike, including a local chapter of the Coalition of Labor Union Women, a local union of the Communications Workers of America, and the Northern Virginia Labor Council, which donated $1,500 to Local 2069's strike fund. On April 30, the union announced via their Facebook page that the UAW and Volvo Trucks had come to a tentative agreement for a five-year contract that would see an immediate end to the strike starting at 7 a.m. that day. While the union did not release details for the contract, they stated that truck production would resume the following Monday, May 3. Following the agreement, union members voted on three ballot issues pertaining to benefits, pay, and scheduling, with the results being released on May 16. In a landslide, the union members voted to reject all three ballot issues with ranges from 83 to 91 percent against. Following this, on May 20, the union announced that they had reached a six-year tentative agreement with the company that included several changes to the policies that union members had overwhelmingly voted against. Voting on this new agreement took place on June 6 from 9 a.m. to 5 p.m. Like the previous agreement, union members again rejected the proposal by large margins, with 90 percent voting against the scheduling provisions and 91 percent voting against the salary provisions.

=== Second strike action ===
On June 7, with both proposals having been rejected by union members, Local 2069 recommenced strike action at noon. A lunch buffet was set up at the union building and picketing started back up near the plant. Local 2069 President Matt Blondino stated that the strike would be open-ended and continue until a satisfactory agreement had been reached. In a statement released after the striking restarted, the company again expressed disappointment with the union members' decision, noting that UAW leadership had endorsed the agreement, but stated that they remained open to continue negotiations. During the first few days of the strike, a few workers crossed the picket line and returned to work. Workers on strike received $275 per week from UAW in strike pay, though this was significantly less than what many made at the plant, where some workers had hourly wages of around $20. In addition, the union offered some healthcare coverage. Over the next few days, picketing continued and spread to the nearby Interstate 81. Private security was hired by the company, and confrontations sometimes arose between strikers and strikebreakers, with The Roanoke Times reporting that some workers had been harangued by strikers. On June 15, negotiations recommenced between the company and union, and on June 19, members from another UAW local representing Freightliner Trucks workers in Cleveland, North Carolina, traveled to Dublin and picketed in solidarity with Local 2069. On July 1, a third tentative deal had been reached between the company and union, with a ratification vote planned for the ensuing days. While the union did not disclose details of the tentative agreement, the company released a statement that said the proposed contract would "eliminate the two-tier wage structure; immediately take any employee currently in wage progression and hired on or before June 30, 2015 to top pay; institute a six-year progression to top pay for all employees, giving credit for years of active service; increase the new hire starting pay by more than 14 percent; and guarantee no increases in health insurance premiums over the life of the contract for the plant’s best-in-class health insurance coverage, an employee benefit which represents a cost of more than $20,000 a year per employee". Speaking about the proposal, UAW President Ray Curry stated, "UAW members and their families felt strongly about the need for financial stability gains in this contract and were willing to strike not once, but twice, to achieve those gains. The elected bargaining team of the UAW Volvo Truck Council worked very hard to achieve these significant gains, and they could not have achieved them without the solidarity of Local 2069 members."

On July 9, for a third time the union members voted to reject the proposal, with roughly 60 percent voting against it. Similarly to the previous two times, the company again issued a statement that stressed the UAW leadership's support for the proposal and that they would "consider all options" related to a resolution to the strike. On July 11, the company announced that the negotiators for both sides were at an impasse and that they would reopen the facility the next day under the terms of the last proposal, which the company deemed its final offer. Shortly thereafter, the union announced a vote on the final offer had been scheduled for July 14. Local 2069 President Blondino stated that the company was attempting to break the union with their decision to declare an impasse, and he said that, following the vote, the local would have the option of filing a complaint against the company with the National Labor Relations Board. On that day, by a slim margin, the contract was approved, with strikers to return to work on July 18. The hourly portion of the contract was approved in a 1,147–1,130 vote, while the common portion passed in a vote of 1,193–1,176. However, despite this, salaried workers voted to reject their part of the contract in a vote of 54–40. (Note: One source gives the tally as 45–40. However, that source cites a Facebook post made by UAW Local 2069 that gives a tally of 54-40.) meaning that further negotiations would continue.

== Aftermath ==
According to the Associated Press, the final offer contained higher wage increases than the second proposal the company had made and included pay bonuses. Specifically, the contract included a 12 percent pay raise spread out over the course of the six years the contract would be in effect. Additionally, newer workers would be phased out of a two-tier pay system that saw them make less money than employees who had been working at the plant for longer, so that at the end of the six years, all workers would be making an hourly wage of $30.92. Most of the employees would also receive a one-time $2,000 signing bonus. The contract also includes a price freeze on the company's health care premiums for the duration of the contract. With regards to the salaried employees, UAW President Curry stated after the vote that a process for addressing their concerns would be set up to resolve the lingering dispute.

== See also ==
- COVID-19 pandemic in Virginia
- Strikes during the COVID-19 pandemic
