= 1946 Oakland general strike =

Strike action in California, US

- On the first day of the general strike, crowds gather in the streets, blocking traffic in downtown Oakland.
- Date: December 3–5, 1946
- Location: Oakland, California
- Methods: Striking

Parties
Workers	ㅤ

Number
50,000	

The 1946 Oakland general strike was a general strike involving 50,000 workers over two days in Oakland, California, United States. Beginning at 5:00am on December 3, it ended two days later on December 5 at 11:00am. The strike followed a previous, smaller scale strike action by 400 female employees of Hastings and Kahn's, who had walked out in the fall of 1946 because of the resistance Oakland's retail merchants had to unionization. It was part of a strike wave which began the year prior following the end of the World War II.

== Attempts to organize Kahn's and Hastings ==
Attempts to organize the Oakland department stores Kahn's and Hastings began in the summer of 1946 by Al Kidder, a war veteran who had recently returned home. Kahn's and Hastings were the city's landmark downtown department stores and the largest employers of nonunion workers in the central business district. Kidder was working in the shoe department at Kahn's in 1946. His mother had been working in the Kahn's "ready room" in the basement where workers would wait to be called to the main retail floor.

They were compensated only for the time spent on the main floor. Kidder earned $28 per week as a shoe salesman at Kahn's, but learned that salespeople working at other specialty stores in town were making $10 more per week than he was. These practices prompted Al Kidder to approach the unions to ask why they didn't organize the stores. A strike was initiated on October 23, 1946, at the Oakland department stores of Kahn's and Hastings when a female employee at Kahn's was fired after joining a union. Kidder served as a picket captain during the strikes at the department stores and played a role in the general strike that was to follow.

== Strike ==
This strike was a powerful landmark event in the labor history of Northern California. However, it was one that was misperceived in comparison to the many other strikes that occurred during the 1945-1946 strike wave. The strike strengthened in early December, when with the support of the city government and business leaders, management called upon the police to remove the picketers.

During the 1946 general strike, working men and women gathered in the streets of downtown Oakland to support striking department store employees. Oaklanders were part of a nationwide strike wave in 1946 that represented organized labor's efforts to ensure that postwar demobilization did not erode workers’ standard of living. Oakland's strike was also unique because behind it lay a drive to organize new workers: female department store clerks.

With the intensity continuing, the AFL (American Federation of Labor) in Alameda County decided to join forces with the clerks. A "Work Holiday" was declared by 142 AFL unions, leading 100,000 workers to walk off their jobs. By the first night of the strike, all strikers commanded all the stores to shut down, except pharmacies, food markets, and bars. Veterans of World War II that were engaging in the strike marched around the Tribune Tower, performing close-order drills, demanding that the mayor along with the city council step down from office. The first 24 hours of the strike was full of excitement, jukeboxes being played on the sidewalk, while couples danced in the street.

By the second day, however, almost half of the strikers dissipated. Harry Lundeberg, SUP's Secretary-Treasurer, was one of the many major leaders in the San Francisco General Strike. He was called upon from a pay telephone on the streets of Oakland to come out and support. Lundeberg spoke to an overflowing crowd of picketers, displaying his rage: "These flinky gazoonies who call themselves city fathers have been taking lessons from Hitler and Stalin. They don't believe in the Unions that are free to strike." The focus of his verbal attack was intended for the city council.

On December 5 the AFL Central Labor Council declared an end to the strike and sent a sound truck to relay their decision. Still, some workers and truckers stayed picketing with the women clerks. All except the clerks were ordered back to work, having to face disciplinary action if they were to continue picketing.

== Outcome ==
The result of the strike left every official in the Oakland Teamsters Local 70 out of office. Also, the United AFL–CIO (American Federation of Labor and Congress of Industrial Organizations) was created to aid candidates in running for office. Five seats were open out of the nine total City Council seats; four labor-sponsored candidates were elected to the city council.
