= Streetcar strikes in the United States =

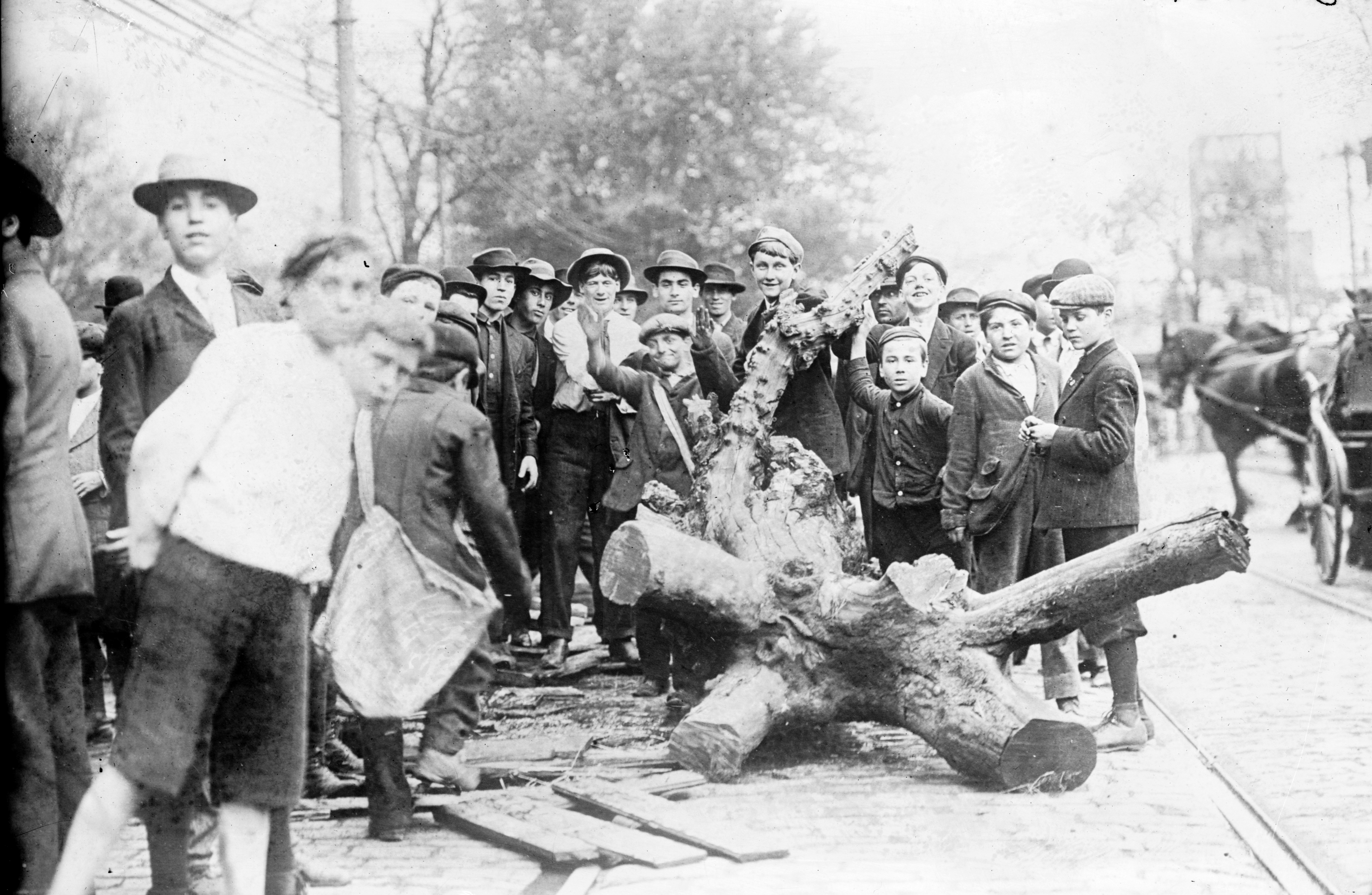
- Boys in Cleveland, Ohio with track obstruction, 1908; (Note: see File:Cleveland Streetcar strike.jpg) Cleveland's streetcar system had eight strikes in its history.
- Date: 1895–1929
- Location: United States
- Methods: Strikes, protest, demonstrations

From 1895 to 1929, streetcar strikes affected almost every major city in the United States. Sometimes lasting only a few days, these strikes were often "marked by almost continuous and often spectacular violent conflict," at times amounting to prolonged riots and weeks of civil insurrection.

Following the 1929 New Orleans streetcar strike, less violent strikes persisted for decades, such as the Atlanta transit strike of 1950. The rise of private automobile ownership limited its impact.

== Tactics ==
Electrified streetcars posed an attractive target for striking unions like the Amalgamated Street Railway Employees of America. Unlike factory buildings, streetcar routes and cars were spread out and difficult to protect. The routes went through the working class neighborhoods of cities; riders tended to be sympathetic to union causes. Their overhead lines and physical tracks were vulnerable to sabotage. And their function as transportation for workers in other industries opened the possibility of leveraging a transit strike into a general strike, as in the Philadelphia trolley strike and riots of 1910.

Streetcar strikes rank among the deadliest armed conflicts in American labor union history. Samuel Gompers of the American Federation of Labor called the St. Louis Streetcar Strike of 1900 "the fiercest struggle ever waged by the organized toilers" up to that point, with a total casualty count of 14 dead and about 200 wounded, more than the Pullman Strike of 1894. The casualty count for the San Francisco Streetcar Strike of 1907 saw 30 killed and about 1000 injured.

Despite the transit disruption, which sometimes lasted for months, and despite the fact that many of the casualties were passengers and innocent bystanders, "the strikers invariably enjoyed wide public support, which extended beyond the working class."

The owners' tactic was simply to keep the routes running. To counter hostile crowds, the line owners turned to strikebreakers. Foremost among them was James A. Farley (1874–1913), who specialized in streetcar strikes—he claimed to have broken 50—and was said to command an army of forty thousand strikebreakers to be deployed anywhere in the country. Much of the violence of the 1907 San Francisco strike was attributable to Farley, who reportedly cleared $1 million there. He was doing more than $10 million in business by 1914.

== Examples ==
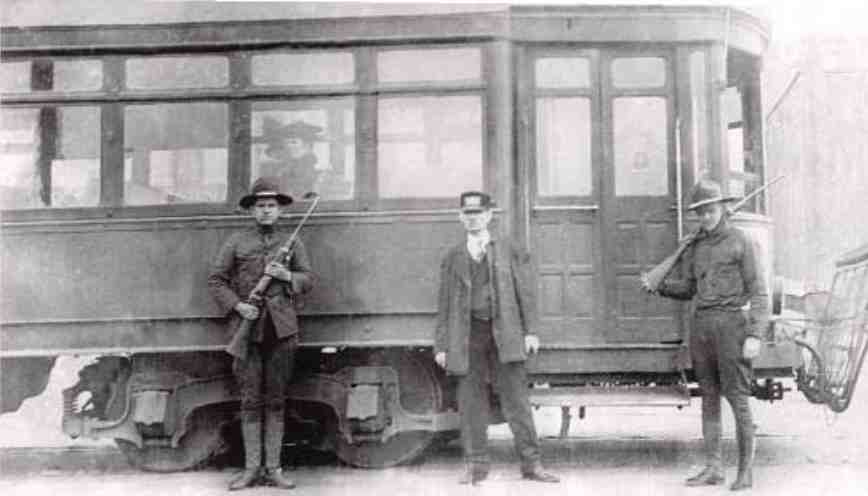
National Guard soldiers guarding a Kansas City streetcar during a 1918 motorman and conductor strike

Examples of American streetcar strikes include:

- 1889, Twin Cities, Minnesota
- 1891, Detroit, Michigan, where strikers had the vocal support of Mayor Hazen S. Pingree, part of his administration's long successful struggle against local traction companies
- 1892 Indianapolis streetcar strike
- 1895, Brooklyn, New York City, the first in which Farley was involved
- 1896, Milwaukee
- 1899, Cleveland, Ohio
- 1900, St. Louis, where the dynamiting of streetcars was a "nightly occurrence"
- 1903, Los Angeles
- 1907, San Francisco, California, with 31 killed and an estimated 1000 people injured
- 1908, Cleveland, Ohio
- 1908, Pensacola, Florida
- 1910, Columbus, Ohio
- 1913, Buffalo, where two regiments of the National Guard were called out to quell a full day of rioting and mob violence, with several wounded by gunfire, and widespread property damage

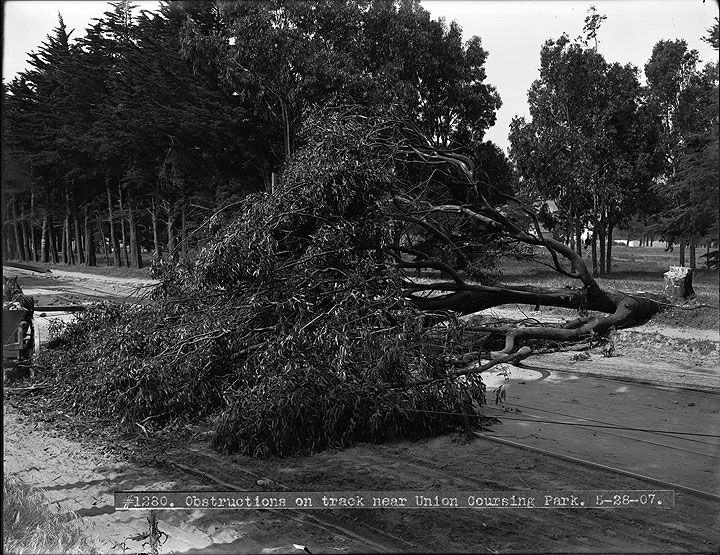
Striking workers during the San Francisco streetcar strike in 1907 fell tree to obstruct the tracks.

- 1913, Indianapolis
- 1916, Atlanta
- 1916, Portland, Maine
- 1916–17, Springfield, Missouri
- 1917, Twin Cities, Minnesota
- 1917, Bloomington, Illinois
- 1917, the San Francisco United Railroads strike
- 1917, Seattle and Tacoma streetcar employees
- 1919, Los Angeles
- 1919, Charlotte, North Carolina
- 1920, Denver, Colorado, which left 7 dead and 80 wounded
- 1929, New Orleans, Louisiana
- 1934, Milwaukee
- 1944, Philadelphia
- 1974–75, New Orleans

== Fiction ==
Scenes of streetcar strikes, and the friction between owners and workers, appear in contemporary fiction such as Theodore Dreiser's Sister Carrie of 1900 (based on Dreiser's own experience in a Toledo, Ohio strike), and William Dean Howells' A Hazard of New Fortunes of 1890.

== Archives ==
- Amalgamated Transit Union, Local 587 Records. 1941–2011. 15 cubic feet (17 boxes).
- Asahel Curtis photographs. 1881–1941. 5.46 cubic feet (13 boxes). 1,678 photographic prints.
