= 1889 Twin Cities streetcar strike =

1899 Twin Cities streetcar strike
- Part of streetcar strikes in the United States
- Date: October 11–24, 1899
- Location: Minneapolis–Saint Paul, Minnesota, United States
- Caused by: 15% reduction in wages
- Goals: Restored wages
- Methods: Strike action
- Result: Company fires several unionized employees, resists union demands, succeeds in breaking the strike

Parties
Knights of Labor	Minneapolis Street Rail Company

Number
700–1,500	

The 1889 Twin Cities streetcar strike was a labor strike involving streetcar workers in the Minneapolis–Saint Paul metropolitan area of Minnesota, popularly known as the Twin Cities. Wage cuts to employees of the streetcar companies prompted a fifteen day strike from April 11 to April 24, 1889. The streetcar companies broke the strike with few concessions. It was the first major transit strike in the Twin Cities.

== History ==
In early April 1889, streetcar magnate Thomas Lowry who owned the Minneapolis Street Railway Company announced a 15 percent pay cut for all company employees to help cover the cost of new cable car lines. Reductions ranged from one to four cents per hour, depending upon the position. Additionally, Lowry posted pledges in the car barns prohibiting membership in the union, which already existed. Workers saw the cuts as a contract violation and a clear indication of Lowry's anti-union stance.

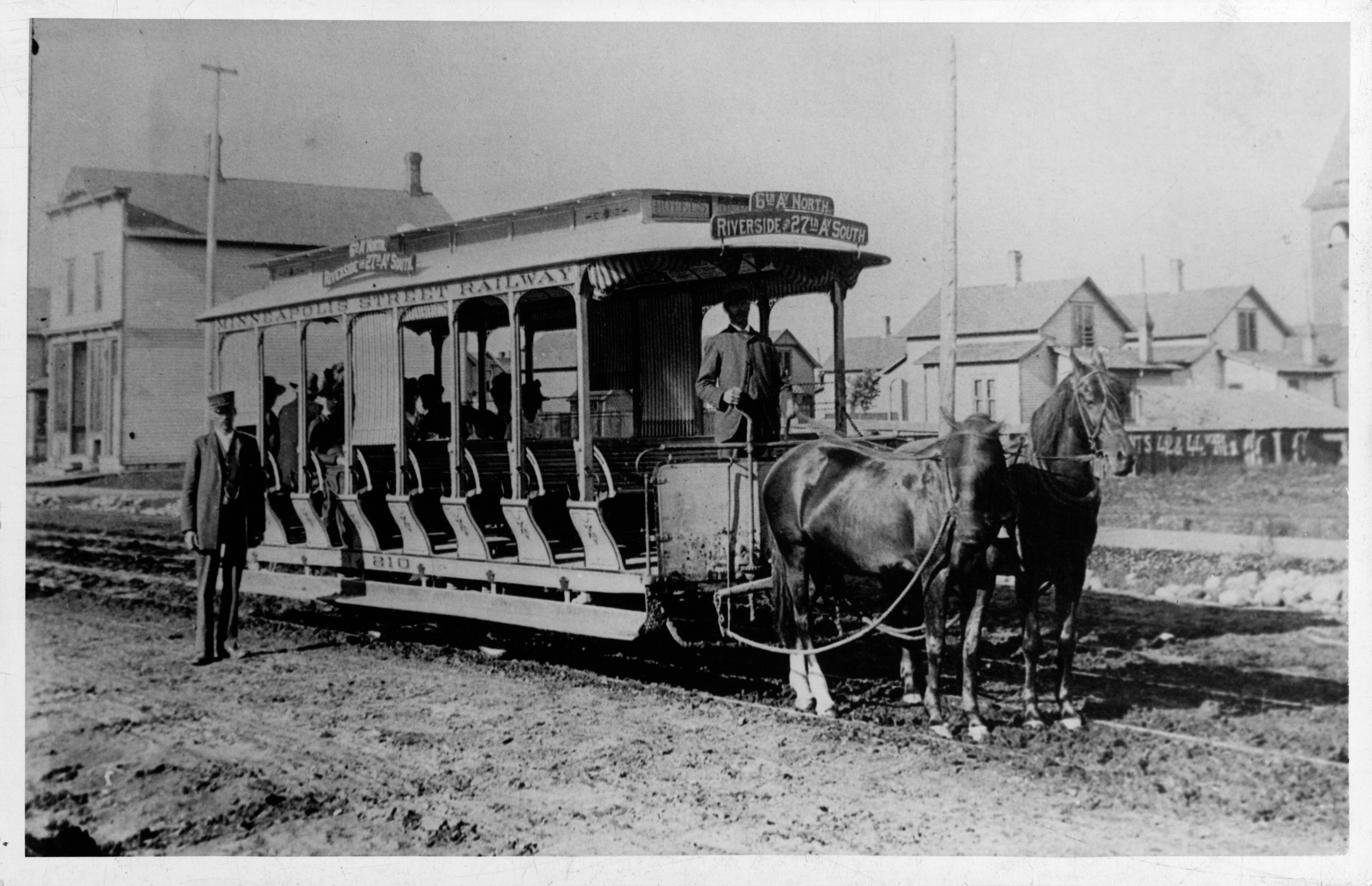
Horse drawn streetcar in 1888 in the Cedar-Riverside neighborhood of Minneapolis

On April 11, 1889, six hundred Minneapolis streetcar drivers walked off the job. Three hundred St. Paul drivers and other workers struck the following morning. Most of the strikers were members of the Street Railways Employees' Protective Association. Ridership dropped and the Knights of Labor began a petition drive to force Lowry to negotiate or give up the streetcar franchise.

Lowry indicated that the strikers could come back to work at the reduced wage if they agreed not to participate in union activity within the company. However, strikers hoped public pressure would force Lowry to restore lost wages.

The morning of April 12, the few streetcars that were active were attacked. An estimated ten thousand people gathered along the Washington Avenue line. They shouted "scab" and "bread stealer", placed obstructions on the tracks and threw stones, eggs, and bricks at the drivers. Police arrested five men, including two strikers. Minneapolis Mayor Edward C. Babb then placed fifty special police on cars, attempting to run the streetcars with police escorts, and at the storage barns. By 1889, the police force consisted of 169 uniformed officers and the Minneapolis Police Department came down hard on the strikers, establishing an example of how to use violence against workers.

On the evening of April 13, a crowd of ten thousand gathered in Bridge Square in Minneapolis to hear labor leaders J. P. McGaughey, Tom H. Lucas, and labor journalist Eva McDonald.

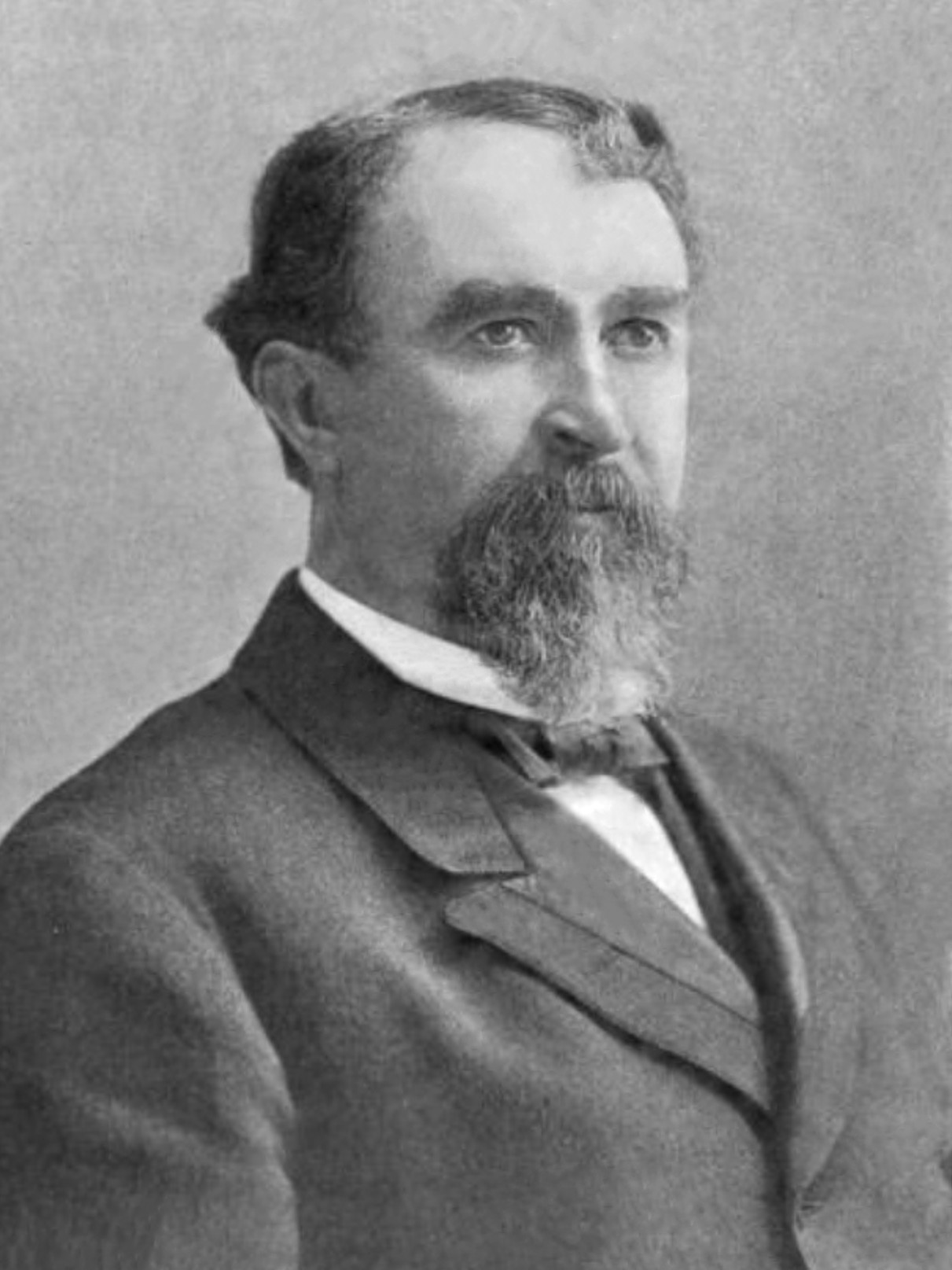
Thomas Lowry in 1902.

The strikers favored arbitration but saw Lowry as unlikely to cooperate. Lowry's franchise in each city depended upon all his streetcars operating on a regular schedule. The strikers reasoned that without drivers the cars couldn't operate, which would force a forfeit of each franchise. They presented a petition with twenty thousand signatures to the Minneapolis City Council citing this operation requirement. Reluctant to act, the council submitted the strikers' petition to Governor William Rush Merriam, who viewed the strike as a local government matter and declined involvement. However, more violence on April 17 prompted the council to mandate that all streetcar lines must be up and running by noon on April 22 or Lowry would lose his franchise.

On April 20, thirty-eight armed "cowboys" arrived from Kansas as replacement drivers. The company offered the new drivers two dollars per week and protection. Public response was one of indignation and apprehension, which led to increased support for the strikers—and increased violence.

As many as ten thousand people gathered by the tracks the morning of April 21 (Easter Sunday) to greet the streetcars with a show of rocks, bricks, and bottles of acid. The mob tore up tracks and piled debris upon others. They overturned two cars, and destroyed the Riverside turntable. The protesters pulled one driver from his car and beat him. Police reinforcements arrived and made thirty-three arrests. Later that evening, union sympathizers tore up a section of the Riverside tracks and police took two more men into custody. The company ordered all cars back to the barns until morning. The strikers passed a resolution condemning violence, blaming the rioting on the presence of the "cowboys".

By April 23, the strike had taken its toll on both cities and streetcar workers. Judge Isaac Atwater estimated the cost to the city of Minneapolis at five thousand dollars per day, plus losses to local businesses. The city also faced reparation costs of two thousand to three thousand due to Lowry for streetcar property damages.

Strikers in both cities were back at work by April 25, and most streetcar lines resumed operation by the end of the month. Only some of the veteran drivers were re-hired after the strike and the street railway company openly discriminated against union members. The cable car lines that Lowry had purchased material for, prompting lower wages, were never built.

Some labor leaders hoped that a petition drive and an effort to begin a horse-drawn bus company would help to force Lowry into new negotiations, but the new company went bankrupt by the end of the year, and the petition was burned in the basement of city hall.
