= 1916–1917 Springfield streetcar strike =

Labor strike in Missouri, US

- Date: October 5, 1916 – June 16, 1917
- Location: Springfield metropolitan area, Missouri, US

Casualties
- Deaths: <12
- Injuries: >200

The 1916–1917 Springfield streetcar strike was a strike among streetcar workers in and around Springfield, Missouri, United States. The strike went from October 5, 1916, to June 16, 1917, caused by the streetcar company's refusal to recognize the union. As a result, the union was recognized after 8 months of striking.

== Background ==
At the turn of the century there was no union organization in the street car industry. An effort by the St. Louis street car workers to organize a union in 1900 was violently opposed by St. Louis Transit Company. A call by the county sheriff for a thousand volunteers to be deputized to rid the streets of St. Louis of strikers brought forth a wave of response from the business community. In a short time there were a dozen dead and over 200 wounded. With such a terrible cost, it put an end to any thought by Missouri's street car workers to try to organize a union for the next 15 years.

On January 14, 1916, Reuben Wood, president of the Missouri State Federation of Labor, and Orville Jennings, president of the Springfield Central Trades and Labor Assembly, went to the Springfield Traction Company to meet with its General Manager and Superintendent of Transportation to discuss the company's policies towards organizing a union for its employees. General Manager Anton Van Diense, who was supposed to be at the meeting but was ultimately not, only Superintendent Frank Gallagher was there, speaking for the company, promised not to fire employees who organized a union. Additionally, Gallagher allowed Wood and Jennings to post bulletins in the company's car barns announcing a meeting for persons interested in forming a union.

This union would be known as Division No. 691 was the chapter of the unionized Springfield traction company workers of the Amalgamated Association of Street Railway Employees of America now known as the Amalgamated Transit Union (ATU)

In early February, Division No. 691 elected representatives who held the purpose to receive company recognition. A union committee drafted a proposal and submitted it to the company for review. Company management claimed they had out of town business that the must addend to and that required their immediate attention. They postponed reviewing the union proposal until after returning to Springfield on February 16. On February 17 union representatives “tried diligently all day Friday to locate Mr. Van Diense, both by phone and visiting his office, but was unable to reach him until after 5 o’clock p.m. and then only by phone.”

According to labor leaders, "The traction company intended to resist unionization by ignoring the division's proposal." The company opposed any urgency of endorsement, for the ultimatum.

Following the Friday ultimatum, a unanimous vote of union members launched the first of two consecutive strikes - a short, four-day strike beginning at 5:30 a.m. on February5 18th.

By 1916, however, Springfield street car workers, with the strong backing of State AFL President "Rube" Wood and the whole Springfield labor movement, were ready to try to organize a union.

== Strike ==
Shortly after midnight on October 5, 1916, Division No. 691 held a meeting and passed a motion to strike by a vote of 65 to 2, effective at 5:40 that morning.

The primary difference that set the Springfield street car workers' strike apart from other transit workers unionization efforts in other cities over the United States during period was the position of the Springfield public officials (primarily that of Mayor J. J. Gideon, a native of Christian county, and Chief of Police Barney Rathbone). With the backing of the city council, these two refused to join the management of the Springfield Traction Company in crushing the union. This is another deference between the St. Louis streetcar strike of 1900.

The traction company responded by filing a $200,000 damage suit against Gideon and Rathbone, under failing to protect company property. The final blow to the traction company, however, came in the spring of 1917 when a recall election to remove Gideon from office failed. Apparently convinced they might as well recognize the union, the traction company immediately resumed negotiation and a contract was signed soon after.

After the union was recognized Division No. 691 of the Amalgamated Association of Street and Electric Railway Employees of America and the Springfield Traction Company entered into a three-year agreement mandating five provisions.

1. The company guaranteed arbitration of future conflicts.
2. Employees would return to work on June 25, 1917.
3. Open shop would be maintained.
4. Strikers employed by the company on October 4, excluding those under indictment, would be reinstated with seniority.
5. And a two-part wage adjustment increased first year wages from 17 ½ cents an hour to 19 cents an hour, with one-cent raises following yearly; the second part of the wage plan allowed for corresponding bonuses when average daily revenues were above $28.50. The maximum wage increase, awarded at the $46 mark, was a bonus of 4 cents an hour.

== See also ==
- St. Louis streetcar strike of 1900
- Springfield Traction Company
- Streetcar
