= 1907 San Francisco streetcar strike =

San Francisco streetcar strike
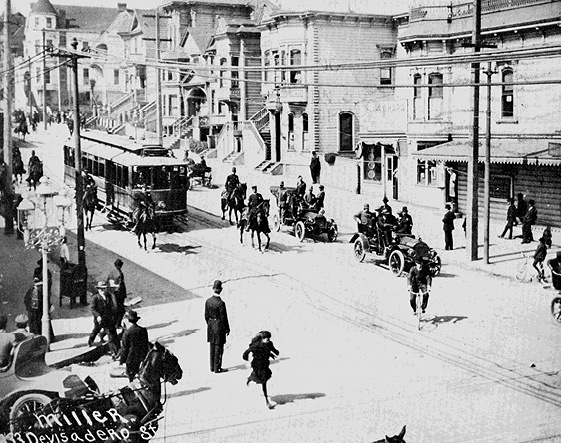
- San Francisco police escort a scab streetcar to protect it from the violence during the strike
- Date: May 5, 1907 – mid-February, 1908
- Location: San Francisco, California
- Goals: 8-hour day $3 per day
- Methods: Striking
- Result: Unsuccessful; Carmen's Union Local 205 disbanded

Parties
Carmen's Union Local 205	United Railroads

Lead figures
Richard Cornelius; Streetcar workers	Patrick Calhoun; James A. Farley

Casualties
- Deaths: 31 (25 passengers)
- Injuries: 1100 (900 passengers)

The San Francisco streetcar strike of 1907 was among the most violent of the streetcar strikes in the United States between 1895 and 1929. Before the end of the strike, thirty-one people had been killed and about 1100 injured.

== Background ==
Like the St. Louis Streetcar Strike of 1900, the events were associated with progressive civic reform.

== Strike ==
Richard Cornelius, President of Carmen's Union No. 205

Patrick Calhoun, President of United Railroads

As the strike loomed, one of the prominent officials of San Francisco's United Railroads, Patrick Calhoun, contracted with the nationally known "King of the Strikebreakers" James A. Farley, for four hundred replacement workers waiting on board ship. The streetcar Carmen's Union, led by founding president Richard Cornelius, struck on May 5, 1907, for an 8-hour day and $3 (Note: equivalent to $104 in 2025 adjusted for inflation) per day. Farley's armed workers took control of the entire system. The violence started two days later, Bloody Tuesday, when a shootout on Turk Street left 2 dead and about 20 injured.

On May 25, both the pro-labor Mayor Eugene Schmitz and Calhoun were indicted on corruption charges, and on June 13 Schmitz was found guilty of extortion, to be replaced by Edward Robeson Taylor. This development seriously undermined labor's political position, and the Daily News was the only one of the city's newspapers to support the strikers. The action effectively collapsed in November, and officially abandoned in mid-February with the dissolution of Carmen's Union Local 205.

== Results ==
Of the 31 deaths from shootings and streetcar accidents, 25 were passengers; 900 of the estimated 1100 injuries were passengers. In 1916 San Francisco labor leader Thomas Mooney would attempt to re-organize the Carmen's Union in San Francisco, a prelude to his notorious trial later that year.

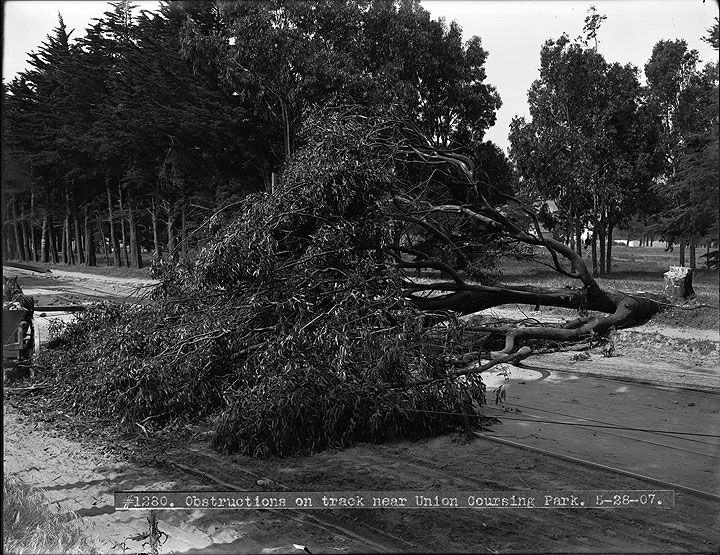
Striking workers fell tree to obstruct tracks during strike.

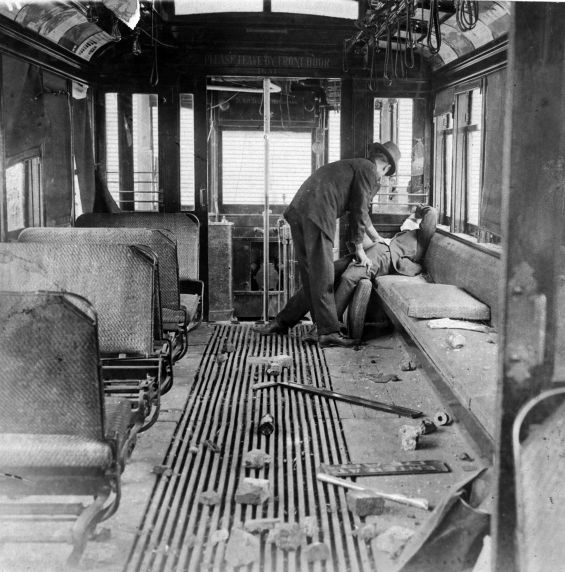
Strikebreaking motorman injured after streetcar attacked.

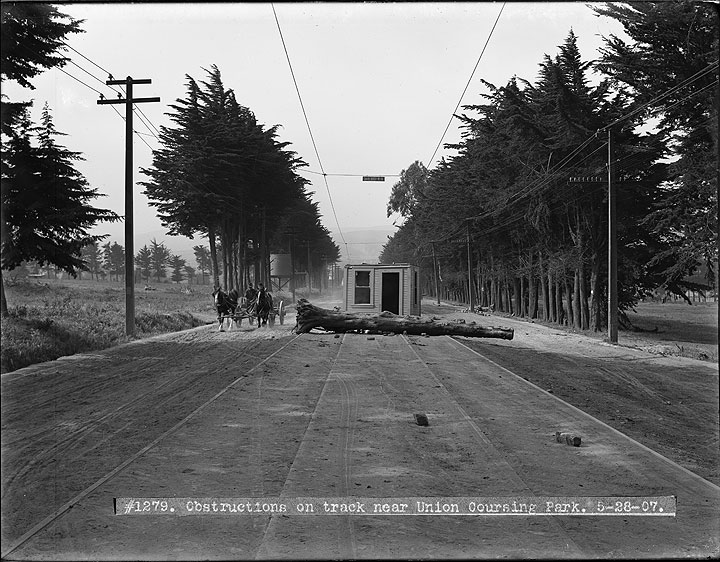
Workers blockade tracks to stop the streetcars from running.

Scenes on two occasions when sympathetic teamsters blocked traffic on the public streets.

== See also ==
- Streetcar strikes in the United States
- St. Louis streetcar strike of 1900
- Murder of workers in labor disputes in the United States
