= 1916 Atlanta streetcar strike =

Labor strike in Georgia, US

The Atlanta streetcar strike of 1916 was a labor strike involving streetcar operators for the Georgia Railway and Power Company in Atlanta, Georgia. Precipitated by previous strike action by linemen of Georgia Railway earlier that year, the strike began on September 30 and ended January 5 of the following year. The main goals of the strike included increased pay, shorter working hours, and union recognition. The strike ended with the operators receiving a wage increase, and subsequent strike action the following year lead to union recognition.

== Background ==
The streetcar strike followed a previous labor dispute regarding linemen of the Georgia Railway and Power Company earlier that year. In June, the linemen requested a ten percent wage increase from the company, which was refused. Following this, the linemen brought William Pollard of the International Brotherhood of Electrical Workers (IBEW) to the city to help organize a labor strike (a local of the IBEW in Atlanta had been established years earlier in 1890). On August 12, the linemen went on strike over the firing of five linemen, of whom three had union affiliations. (Note: One source mentions a walkout that occurred a day prior.) The strike ended as the company agreed to reinstate the two non-union affiliated men and, while not recognizing the IBEW, did acknowledge the linemen's right to unionize. The local newspapers gave relatively little coverage of the event. Preston S. Arkwright, then-President of Georgia Railway and Power, alleged that following this incident, Pollard began to assist in the unionizing of the streetcar operators. Hardy Teat of the Brotherhood of Locomotive Firemen assisted, and together they began to organize streetcar operators under the Amalgamated Association of Street and Electric Railway Employees, affiliated with the American Federation of Labor (AFL). On September 28, Pollard was called to the offices of the Atlanta Chief of Police under accusations of plans to incite violence and a riot. Two days later, Pollard was called to testify before Atlanta Mayor James G. Woodward, where Woodward warned him that he would be arrested if a strike were to occur.

== Course of the strike ==
On September 30 at 6 pm, Teat called The Atlanta Journal to notify them that a strike involving conductors and motormen of the Atlanta Railway had commenced. The main goals of the strike were higher wages, union recognition, and shorter hours. Additionally, the strikers were opposed to the mandatory membership in the company's "benevolent society", which required dues of 50 cents per month. In downtown Atlanta, several streetcars were left abandoned as the operators deserted their posts. Because of the profile the operators held among Atlanta's blue-collar workers, the strike received a considerable degree of support from the general public. In East Point, Georgia, a crowd of several hundred had formed to cheer as 16 cars were abandoned. Georgia Railway had prepared for the strike by assembling 30 men (Note: One source gives this number as 300.) to take over, and within a few minutes of the strike's beginning, the streetcars in downtown were again running, though suburban routes, such as those in East Point and Fort McPherson, were not resumed.

Following the commencement of the strike, large groups of spectators and strike supporters formed in downtown, with strikers yelling at passing streetcars and urging the operators to join the strike. While The Atlanta Constitution initially reported that the crowd's were "boisterously good-natured", the crowds became more restless as the strike carried on. Strikers began to shout at the replacement workers, calling them scabs and attempting to pull them from the streetcars and steal their badges and caps. By 10:30 pm, the company called all their streetcars to return to their carbarns, citing a lack of protection from the police. Within an hour of this, a federal judge in Atlanta issued a restraining order on two unions and several union leaders. As the dispute continued, incidents of violence regarding the strikes were reported. Around 9 pm, a streetcar stop was torched, and there were many reports of strikers greasing tracks and damaging streetcars. Dynamiting was reported in several cases, including an incident in which two women were severely injured. However, there is debate as to who was responsible for the incidents of dynamite. Several streetcar operators, interviewed years after the strike, alleged that the company had placed dynamite on several streetcars and blamed the union.

On October 2, a group of prominent Atlanta citizens held a meeting at the Atlanta Chamber of Commerce and formed a committee on law and order. This group, headed by an executive committee that had Coca-Cola Company founder Asa Griggs Candler as its chairman, collaborated with the police and county commissioners during the course of the strike. On October 3, the president of the newly created Amalgamated Association Local 732 released five points as the cause of the strike, which included long hours, low wages, mandatory membership in the company's benevolent society, expression of political opinions as grounds for firing, and claims that issues were caused by outside interference. That same month, strikers and strike supporters began operating jitneys in order to recuperate lost wages and put more pressure on the railway company. While Woodward had banned the strikers from addressing the public from public areas, such as the Henry W. Grady statue, on October 13, a pro-strike rally at the Municipal Auditorium was attended by approximately 8,500 people. Among these supporters were local members of the Socialist Party of America.

In November, Warren Akin Candler, brother of Asa Candler and a bishop in the Methodist Episcopal Church, South, banned the use of Methodist churches in the city for strike meetings. Prior to this, many pro-strike meetings were held in the city's Methodist churches. That same month, Pollard, who had been indicted for insurrection, was placed on trial. On December 6, his case ended with a mistrial. On January 5, 1917, the company agreed to a pay increase for the operators, but refused to rehire fired union members or recognize the union. While this ended the strike, tensions between the union and company remained high for several months afterwards regarding the lack of union recognition, and on July 16, 1918, another strike commenced. Lasting only four days, this subsequent strike ended with arbitration from the National War Labor Board and lead to the company agreeing to recognize the union.

== See also ==
- Streetcar strikes in the United States
- Streetcars in Atlanta

== Bibliography ==
- Garrett, Franklin M. (1969). Atlanta and Environs: A Chronicle of Its People and Events, 1880s-1930s. University of Georgia Press. ISBN 978-0-8203-0264-5 – via Google Books.
- Kemp, Kathryn W. (2002). God's Capitalist: Asa Candler of Coca-Cola. Mercer University Press. ISBN 978-0-86554-782-7 – via Google Books.
- Kuhn, Clifford M.; Joye, Harlon E.; West, E. Bernard (1990). Living Atlanta: An Oral History of the City, 1914-1948. University of Georgia Press. ISBN 978-0-8203-1697-0 – via Google Books.
- Martin, Jean (Winter 1976). "Mule to Marta, Volume II, 1902–1950". Atlanta Historical Bulletin. XX (4). Atlanta Historical Society: 1–208 – via Atlanta History Center.
- Scott, Carole E.; Guynn, Richard D. (Fall 2000). "The Atlanta Streetcar Strikes". The Georgia Historical Quarterly. 84 (3). Georgia Historical Society: 434–459. ISSN 0016-8297. JSTOR 40584340.
