= Thomas Lowry =

American lawyer (1843–1909)

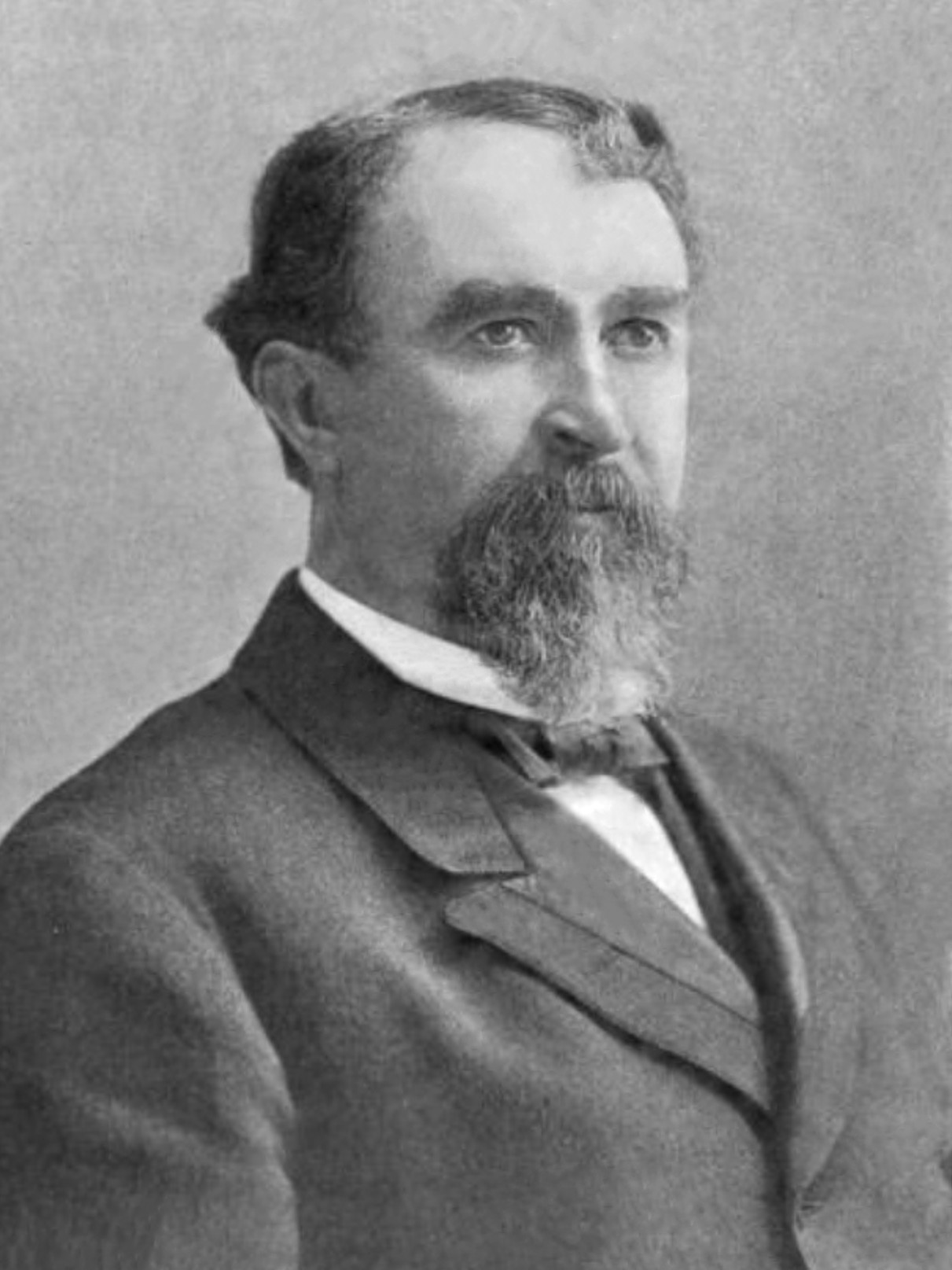
- Lowry in 1902
- Born: February 27, 1843; Logan County, Illinois, U.S.
- Died: February 4, 1909 (aged 65); Minneapolis, Minnesota, U.S.
- Resting place: Lakewood Cemetery
- Relatives: Jane Lowry (granddaughter)

Thomas Lowry (February 27, 1843 – February 4, 1909) was an American lawyer, real-estate magnate, and businessman who oversaw much of the early growth of the streetcar lines in the Twin Cities area of Minneapolis, St. Paul, and surrounding communities in Minnesota. He became head of the Minneapolis Street Railway Co., later to become part of Twin City Rapid Transit (TCRT).

== Early life ==
Lowry was born in Logan County, Illinois, where he attended country schools. At age 17, he attended Lombard University in Galesburg, Illinois but left the college at age 20 due to tuberculosis. He spent a year traveling along the Missouri River before finishing his education, reading law at the office of Judge John C. Bagby in Rushville and passing the bar in 1867.

== Career ==
He then came to Minneapolis in 1867. He entered a law partnership with Austin H. Young who became Judge of the Court of Common Pleas for Hennepin County in 1871. Around the same time, Lowry married Beatrice Goodrich and began investing in real estate. During the 1870s, more than one-third of the property that is now Minneapolis passed through Lowry's hands. He built his family's home in the Minneapolis neighborhood still known as Lowry Hill, then at the edge of the city. He was hurt financially by the panic of 1873, which inspired him to seek work in the railway industry.

In 1875, he was recruited to join the Minneapolis Street Railway, which was rushing to begin operations along with Colonel William S. King. Two years later, in 1877, he had a controlling interest in the company. and in 1878 became president. He managed the company and organized finances, while his brother-in-law Calvin Gibson Goodrich handled other details. In the early days, Lowry spent a lot of time arranging loans so the railway could be expanded. Lowry had the idea to extend rails out into areas that had not yet been developed, much of that land being owned by him. He also owned the St. Paul City Railway Company. The companies merged after the first "interurban" line connected the Twin Cities. The merger became effective at the beginning of 1892. The venture became profitable as the Twin City Rapid Transit Company (TCRT). In 1898, TCRT began building a number of its own streetcars, rather than purchasing them from other companies. The first one of these was a special car for Lowry that had large window panes at one end so that he could see more as the car traveled through the region. It was used by the company on several special occasions, and United States President William McKinley made use of it on a visit to Minneapolis around 1900. In 1914, Lowry began expanding his streetcar line to Lake Minnetonka, advertising it as a tourist destination.

Lowry was involved in labor disputes as a company owner, including the 1889 Twin Cities streetcar strike.

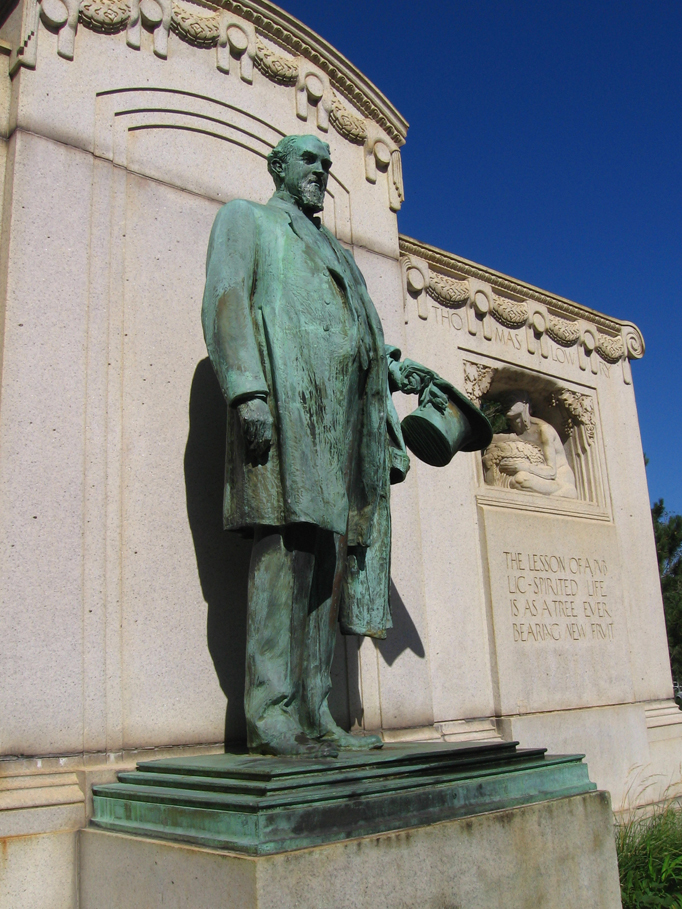
Closeup view of the Thomas Lowry Memorial statue in Smith Triangle Park at the intersection of Hennepin Avenue, Emerson Avenue, and 24th Street in Minneapolis. The inscription reads: "The lesson of a public-spirited life is as a tree ever bearing new fruit."

Lowry also served as president of what would become Soo Line Railroad from 1889 to 1890 and again from 1892 to 1909. He also worked with William de la Barre and Charles Alfred Pillsbury on the Lower Dam Hydro Plant below St. Anthony Falls, with the TCRT using the plant power as soon as it was completed. He also helped to build the West Hotel and bring the 1892 Republican National Convention to Minneapolis. He was a founding member of the Minneapolis Library Board and a sponsor of the city's 1887 Industrial Exposition.

== Personal life ==
Lowry married Beatrice Goodrich. The couple had a son, Horace Lowry, on February 4, 1880. Horace would eventually follow in his father's footsteps, becoming president of Twin City Rapid Transit until his death on August 22, 1931. Lowry Sr. was a member and benefactor of the First Universalist Church of Minneapolis (a.k.a. Church of the Redeemer).

Lowry was a member of the Minnesota Academy of Natural Sciences from its inaugural year and sent for two mummies from Egypt "for the entertainment of children".

During the last four years of his life, Lowry again battled tuberculosis. He gradually withdrew from public life and spent the winter months in Arizona and Texas for his health. Lowry died on February 4, 1909, at his home in Minneapolis. He was buried at the Lowry mausoleum in Lakewood Cemetery.

== Legacy ==
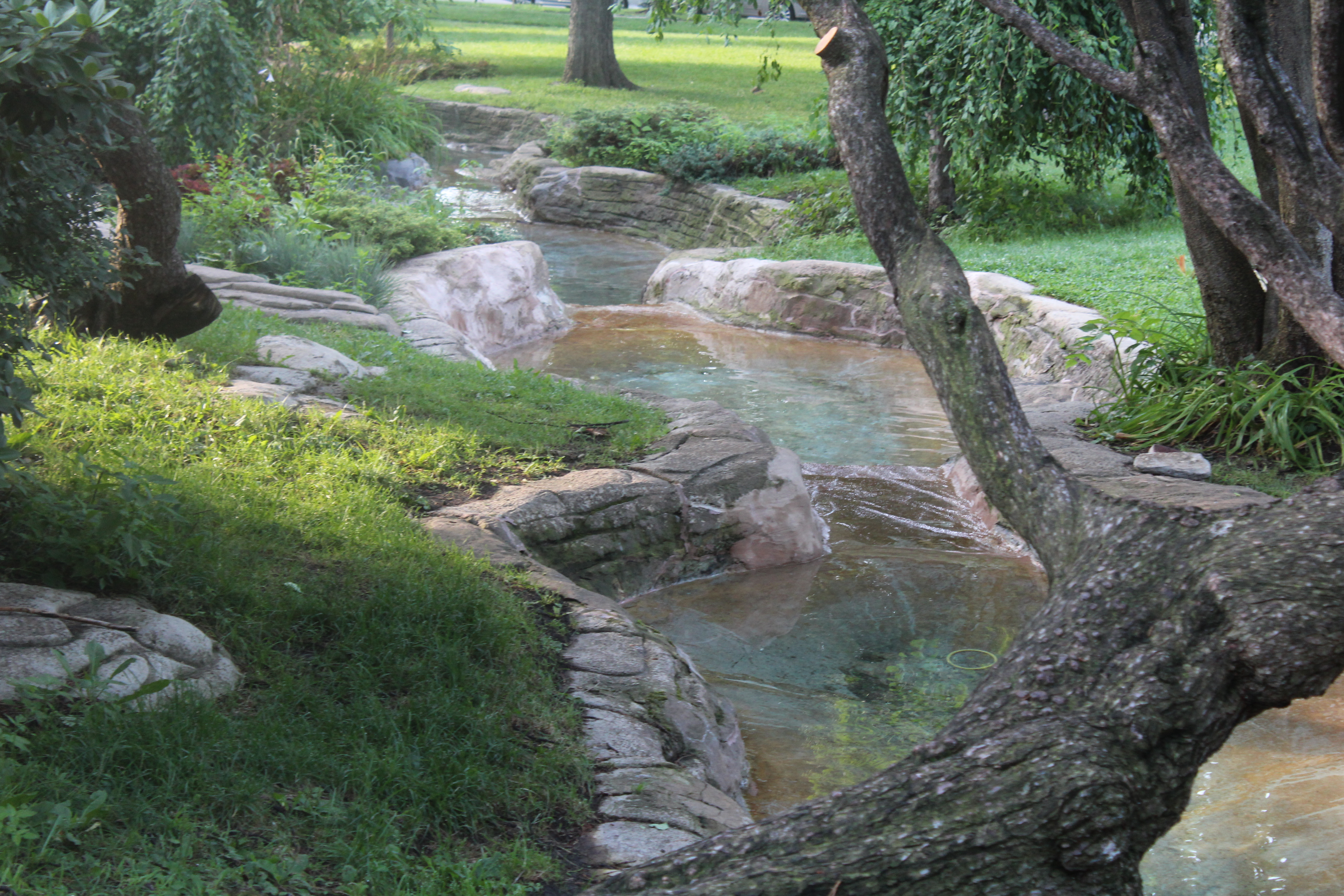
Built in 1924, part of seven cascading pools in Thomas Lowry Park at 900 Douglas Ave. S., Minneapolis

Several sites in Minneapolis are named for Lowry because of his efforts to expand the rail system in the area. Thomas Lowry Park is located at Douglas and Mount Curve Avenues in Lowry Hill, also in memorial of Thomas Lowry.

A memorial by Karl Bitter was dedicated to him at the intersection of Lyndale and Hennepin Avenue in 1915. Originally, the memorial was meant to serve as a welcome to the southwest neighborhoods of Minneapolis. The statue was moved to Smith Triangle Park on Hennepin Avenue in the 1960s due to the construction of the Lowry Hill Tunnel, which reconfigured the Hennepin/Lyndale intersection.
