= Indianapolis streetcar strike of 1913 =

Streetcar strike

Indianapolis streetcar strike
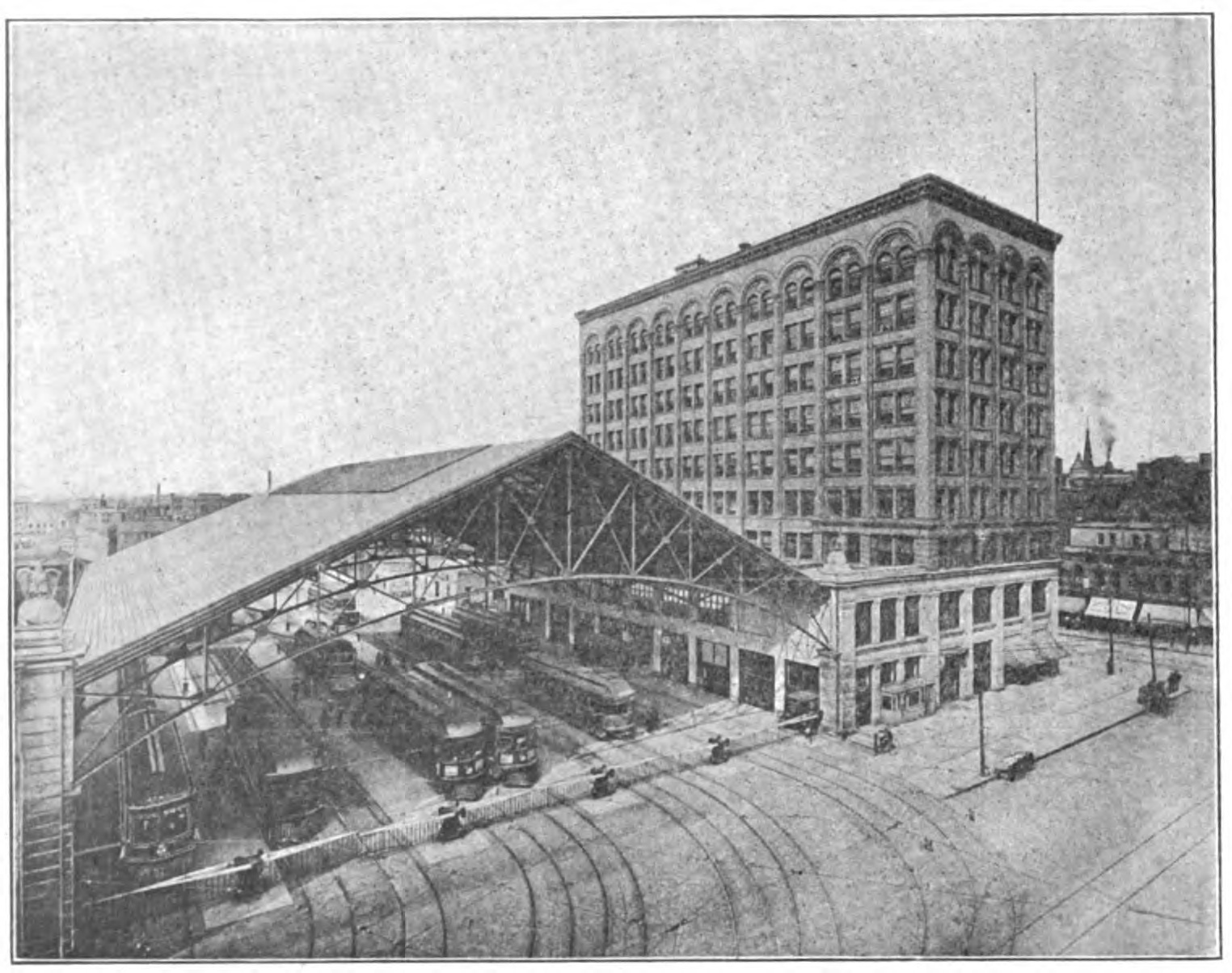
- Indianapolis Traction & Terminal Company's central terminal complex
- Date: October 31, 1913 – November 7, 1913
- Location: Indianapolis, Indiana
- Methods: Striking
- Result: Declaration of martial law

Casualties
- Deaths: 6
- Injuries: 100+

The Indianapolis streetcar strike of 1913 and the subsequent police mutiny and riots was a civil conflict in Indianapolis, Indiana. The events began as a workers strike by the union employees of the Indianapolis Traction and Terminal Company and their allies on Halloween night, October 31, 1913. The company was responsible for public transportation in Indianapolis, the capital city and transportation hub of the U.S. state of Indiana. The unionization effort was being organized by the Amalgamated Street Railway Employees of America who had successfully enforced strikes in other major United States cities. Company management suppressed the initial attempt by some of its employees to unionize and rejected an offer of mediation by the United States Department of Labor, which led to a rapid rise in tensions, and ultimately the strike. Government response to the strike was politically charged, as the strike began during the week leading up to public elections. The strike effectively shut down mass transit in the city and caused severe interruptions of statewide rail transportation and the 1913 city elections.

A riot that lasted four days broke out on November 2 when strikebreakers attempted to restart transit services. At its height, eight to ten thousand rioters flooded downtown Indianapolis and vandalized the city's main business district. Numerous workers, strikebreakers, policemen, and bystanders were injured. Two strikebreakers and four union members were killed. The city police were unable to control the situation and refused orders to combat the rioters as the violence worsened. After pleas for help from city leaders following continued rioting on Election Day, Governor Samuel Ralston called out the Indiana National Guard and put the city under martial law on the evening of November 5.

On November 6, an angry crowd surrounded the Indiana Statehouse, listed their grievances, demanded the military leave the city, and threatened more violence if their demands were not met. Ralston addressed the crowd to promise concessions if the workers would return to work. His speech was credited by the press with ending the strike. After three days of peace, the military withdrew from the city. The Indiana General Assembly met later that month and enacted Indiana's first minimum wage laws, regular working hours, workplace safety requirements, and began projects to improve the city's tenement slums.

Arbitration between the company and its employees by the Indiana Public Service Commission resulted in a decision mostly favoring the company. The employees were permitted to unionize, guaranteed wage increases, a minimum monthly salary, and certain days off work. The company, however, was permitted to continue hiring non-union employees and to bar union membership solicitation on the company's property.

== Background ==
Beginning with the rapid industrial growth that began in Indiana during the gas boom of the late 19th-century, labor unions began to form with goals of increasing wages and providing other benefits to workers through collective bargaining. The Indianapolis Traction and Terminal Company was founded to own and operate the interurban terminal in downtown Indianapolis, and operate the Indianapolis Street Railway under a lease agreement for a term of 31 years. In 1892 the employees of Indianapolis Traction and Terminal Company launched a short-lived strike. The company was the primary public transportation provider in Indianapolis and operated the central transportation hub for the city of Indianapolis and state of Indiana. The company offered small concessions, and the workers returned to work without unionizing.

Leaders of AASEREA continued a campaign to unionize public transportation companies in American cities. The Indianapolis Street Railway Company, a smaller transportation company, did unionize in 1899 when its employees became part of the Amalgamated Association of Street and Electric Railway Employees of America (AASEREA). After a series of successful AASEREA supported strikes, the latest in Cincinnati, Ohio, during May 1913, the union leaders turned their attention back to Indianapolis.

John J. Thorpe, vice president of AASEREA, led the renewed unionization effort, and he and a group of men traveled to Indianapolis. Drawing support from union employees of the Indianapolis Street Railway Company, Thorpe began a campaign to unionize the employees of the Traction and Terminal Company in August 1913. The 900 non-union employees of the Traction and Terminal Company were generally paid much less and worked longer hours than the union workers of the smaller transportation company, and Thorpe considered them to be a prime target for the union organizing attempt.

A committee, headed by Thorpe, was established to recruit employees and headquartered itself at Labor Hall. Throughout September and October, many employees began to join the union, but the Terminal and Traction Company responded by firing employees who joined and refused to recognize the union. After the failure of their initial attempt to have the union recognized by the company, the committee petitioned the United States Department of Labor to mediate discussions between them and the management of the business. On October 27, 1913, the department offered Ethelbert Stewart, head of the Bureau of Labor Statistics, to mediate. To begin negotiations, the workers' committee submitted a list of grievances to the company and Stewart. The company, however, refused his services, denied there was a labor problem and said no attempt at unionizing was being made. They insisted that only a small minority of workers were behind the troubles and alleged that it was outside influences behind the unionizing effort. In a later report, the Department of Labor claimed that had their offer of mediation been accepted, the subsequent strike and riot could have been averted.

The company feared the unionization attempt and hired labor spies to follow the union leaders and determine their plans. The company leadership thought the AASEREA's demands were unreasonable, and believed it to be unfair for the employees' wages to exceed the income the business provided its shareholders. The union men discovered the spies and attacked and injured them. This began a rapid rise in tensions. Less than half of the company's employees had joined the AASEREA, denying Thorpe's committee enough support from the company's employees to enforce a strike. The AASEREA instead sought assistance from other Indianapolis unions. On October 30, a letter signed by Thorpe and other members of the committee was sent to Robert L. Todd, president of the Traction and Terminal Company. In the letter he made a series of demands, including wage increases, reduced work hours, and the reinstatement of men fired for joining the union. The committee informed the company that the demands had to be met if a strike was to be averted.

== Strike ==
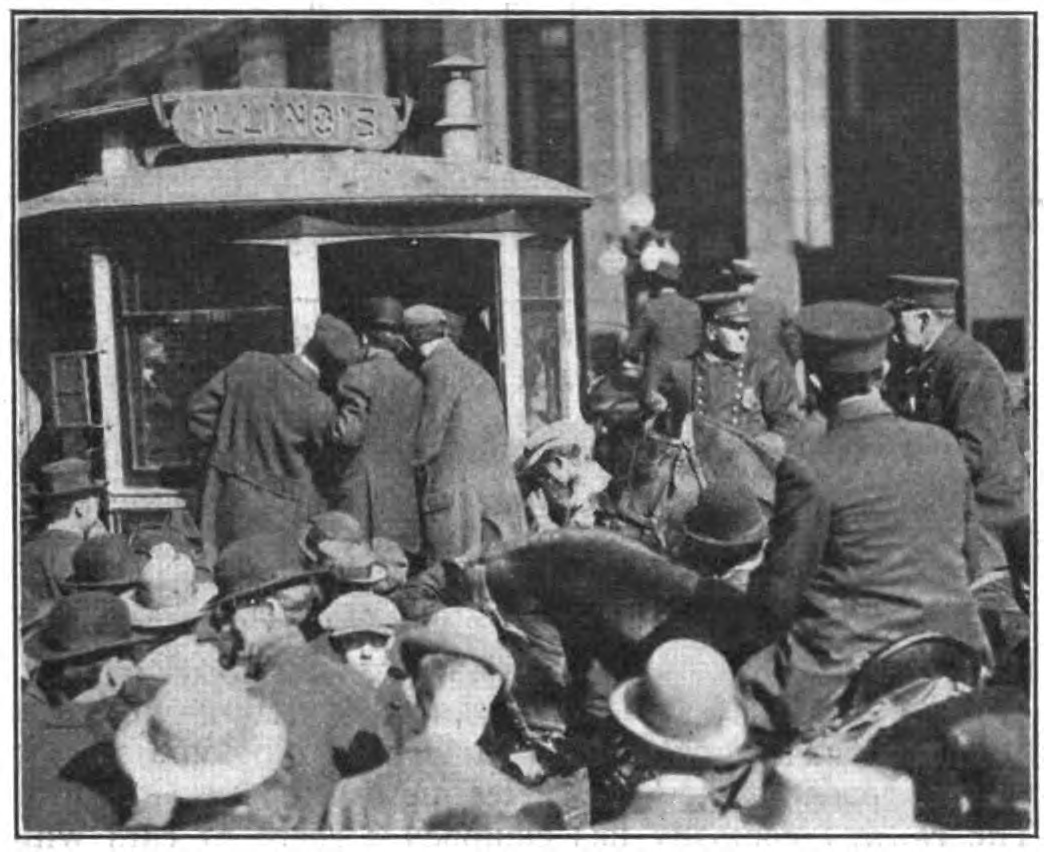
A crowd of strikers surrounds and boards a streetcar being protected by mounted police

On the night of Halloween, October 31, pro-union men called a mass meeting at Labor Hall and those in attendance resolved to support the strike. Aided by the carnival atmosphere of downtown Indianapolis' Halloween festival, the men dispersed around the city to attack streetcars and in some cases forcibly take streetcar drivers to Labor Hall to make oaths in support of the union. Some who resisted were severely beaten.

=== November 1 ===
The following day, the majority of the company's workers appeared for duty, but many were absent. The 65 crews of workmen were able to operate half of the normal routes, and were dispatched to continue operations. The strikers, supported by thousands of other pro-union men, continued their campaign. They blocked streetcar tracks, harassed workers, and demanded that the union be recognized by the company. Dozens of streetcars were vandalized, some were completely destroyed, the overhead electric cables that powered the cars were cut, and passengers were threatened not to ride the cars. Some company employees were forcibly taken multiple times to Labor Hall to repeat their oaths of loyalty to the union before they were convinced or intimidated to join the strike.

As the vandalism had shut down service at the central hub, a police squad was organized and dispatched to protect repairmen while they fixed the overhead cables at the main terminal building. The repairmen and the police were quickly surrounded by the strikers who hurled bricks and beat them with clubs. The police and repairmen were forced to flee and were prevented from restoring power to the terminal's lines. By the afternoon of November 1, the strikers were able to force a complete shut down of the urban central hub and halt all city streetcar operations. The shut down also stopped most of Indiana's inter-city light rail transportation, but regional routes outside of Indianapolis continued to operate. The shut down caused widespread disruption of public transportation and its effects were immediately felt by the public.

=== November 2 ===
After the events of November 1, the Terminal and Traction Company hired 300 professional strikebreakers from the Pinkerton Agency in Chicago to operate the streetcars. Todd wrote an open letter to the city leadership alleging that illegitimate forces from outside the state were behind the events, and that his workers did not truly desire to unionize. He wrote that if his workers could only get adequate police protection, they could resume normal operations.

After the arrival of the strikebreakers on the afternoon of November 2, Indianapolis Police Chief Martin Hyland had mounted city police escort them from Indianapolis Union Station to the company's maintenance and storage carhouses, one block south of the terminal building. The police broke a path through the strikers to allow the strikebreakers into the building so they could prepare to launch the cars. Organized labor leaders held two mass meetings and unions across the city agreed to send additional men to support the strikers against the strikebreakers. A riot began as the strikebreakers attempted to restore transit service. Whenever the strikebreakers launched a streetcar from the storage barns, the strikers attacked them with rocks and brick. They boarded the streetcars, dragged the crews from the cars and lit the cars on fire. Many injuries occurred on both sides and ambulances were called to carry the injured to a hospital. After the destruction of six cars, the strikebreakers abandoned their attempts to restart service.

Despite the widespread vandalism and violence, only twenty arrests were made on the day. The strikers intimidated the police, and only a few were willing to arrest vandals. Chief Hyland and many officers were sympathetic to the strike, but the local judicial magistrates were not. According to one union report, union members who were arrested faced fines up to $50, while the arrested strikebreakers were immediately acquitted by a local judge.

The government response to the strike and riot became a political football between the Republican leadership of Indianapolis, and the Democratic leadership of the state. The refusal by the city police to battle the strikers was met with approval by Mayor of Indianapolis, Republican Samuel Shank. Shank informed Governor Samuel Ralston that the strike was growing beyond what he could control and insisted the Governor should take responsibility for dealing with the situation. Shank asked Ralston to call a special session of the Indiana General Assembly to end the strike through a compulsory arbitration law, but Ralston refused because he thought it unlikely that the General Assembly could agree to such legislation in a timely manner. Ralston believed Shank was undermining the police effort and told him to order the city police back into action, but Shank refused. Ralston then bypassed the mayor and requested that County Sheriff, Democrat Theodore Porttens, bring in county police to reestablish order.

=== November 3 ===
On November 3, Sheriff Porttens deputized two hundred men and they marched to the terminal building where they attempted to assist the strikebreakers in moving the streetcars from the street and vulnerable terminal building to the more easily protected carhouse across the street. Todd led the strikebreakers in the effort while the police provided protection. The police were able to hold back the crowd at first, using clubs to hit anyone who attempted to interfere. The rioters increased the intensity of their attack, and men on the rooftops began throwing stones and bricks. Todd was hit multiple times and was rushed to the hospital with severe injuries. The greatly outnumbered police began to abandon their posts and the strikebreakers fled into the storage buildings. People in the crowd opened fire on a storage building and killed one of the strikebreakers and injured others. By the end of November 3, after two days of protecting the cars, less than fifty policemen remained on duty in the city. Meanwhile, the strike degenerated into a riot encompassing the entire downtown.

Sheriff Porttens was outraged that the police fled and rounded up the officers who were missing and ordered them to protect the streetcars, but thirty-three resigned rather than follow the order. Mayor Shank supported the police mutiny and their refusal to protect the streetcars. He insisted that the situation required Governor Ralston to take action. Without police protection, the Traction and Terminal Company shut down operations and refused to restart them until adequate protection could be provided.

Under the terms of its contract with the city, the company could not cease operations. A lawsuit was brought by a pro-union citizen of the city, A. C. Pearson, against the company to revoke its contract or to force it into receivership so a receiver could negotiate with the strikers. The first court hearing was held on November 4, but the judge put the case on hold until the strike could be resolved. The case was later annulled on November 7 when the same judge ruled that Pearson had no standing to bring such a suit before the court.

=== November 4 ===
On November 4, Election Day for Indianapolis political offices, bands of pro-union men roved the city and vandalized property, burnt streetcars, harassed public officials, and effectively shut down much of the city in the worst violence of the strike. Sheriff Porttens again ordered the police to protect the streetcars, but another twenty-nine officers resigned; because the force was so short on men, the sheriff refused their resignation and put them on other duties.

A group of about 1,500 men began marching towards the electric distribution center used to power the entire streetcar system, several blocks away from the terminal building. The police had maintained a heavy guard around the building during the ongoing strike and Sheriff Porttens had given orders to use firearms to disperse any attempt by the strikers to take the building. As the crowd neared the building, the police opened fire. Several were injured and the crowd was driven away.

Multiple unions across the city declared sympathy strikes and joined the growing crowd. Between 8,000 and 10,000 rioters flooded Illinois Street, the main business district of the city, lighting fires, destroying property, and attacking people.

Strikebreakers made another attempt to move the streetcars into their carhouses to protect them from being vandalized. When rioters in the mob realized what was being done, they attacked the policemen protecting the strikebreakers, and the police clubbed the rioters to drive them back. The rioters fled, and the police resumed their attempt to move the cars only to have the rioters renew the attack. Strikebreakers opened fire on the crowd; four rioters were killed. Numerous injuries were reported, including among the policemen. The rioters eventually overpowered the police and strikebreakers and forced them to abandon their efforts.

=== November 5 ===
After the violence of November 4, the Indianapolis Merchant's Association and other business leaders petitioned Governor Ralston to call out the Indiana National Guard. Members of both parties accused the union leaders of trying to prevent their voters from reaching the polls. The riots made national news and public leaders began to consider them an embarrassment to the state. Union leaders informed the Governor that calling out the guard would only cause them to escalate the riot and lead to more bloodshed.

Ralston, however, finally heeded the calls for action and declared martial law to protect the city and to force an end to the strike. He mobilized 2,200 men of the Indiana National Guard, assembling them in the city's armory and in the basement of the Indiana Statehouse. Companies of troops were armed and set up to protect the important areas of the city while patrols began to enforce a curfew on the night of November 5. Armed companies set up Gatling guns around the headquarters of the Traction and Terminal Company, but Ralston refused a request from company leaders that he order the guard force to operate the streetcars; Ralston instead insisted that business leaders allow him to act as an arbiter between the company and the strikers.

=== November 6 ===
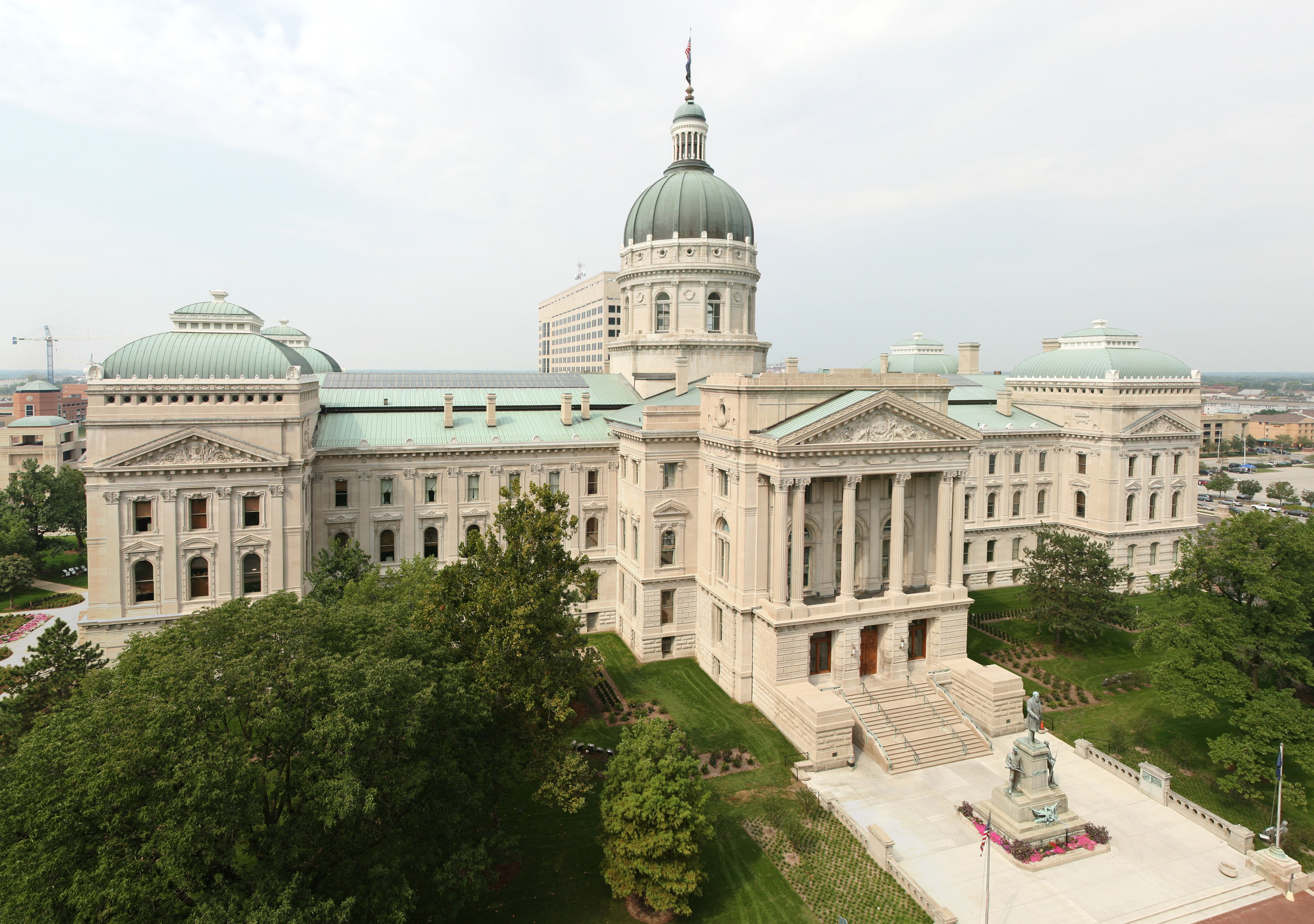
The Indiana Statehouse

At noon on November 6, an angry crowd began to gather at the Indiana Statehouse. Leaders issued a series of demands to the governor and began clamoring for him to appear and address their demands in person. They wanted him to order the guard to leave the city, and call a special session of the Indiana General Assembly to have their grievances addressed by legislation. If the governor refused, they threatened more violence. Although advised by his friends to avoid contact with the crowd, Ralston, escorted by armed guardsmen, exited the statehouse and spoke to the crowd from the steps of the building. He delivered an impassioned speech and stated his reluctance at declaring martial law, but said he was forced to do so to prevent the further loss of life. He promised to withdraw the troops, negotiate with the union leaders, and draft legislation to reform working conditions. In exchange the strikers had to return to work and prove their good faith. His speech calmed the situation and the crowd began to disperse. Ralston was credited by the press and civic leaders like Jacob Piatt Dunn for ending the strike.

On November 7, Ralston called a meeting with company and union leaders to begin negotiations to resolve the strike. The temporary solution was that all workers who had not been involved in violence could return to work, the company would raise wages by five percent, recognize the union, guarantee a minimum weekly salary, and Thorpe and national union leaders would immediately leave the state. The union and company agreed to later submit all grievances to the Indiana Public Service Commission for arbitration, and agreed that their decisions would be final. The arrangement was submitted to a workers' vote and was approved unanimously; the strike ended at 6:00 pm.

== Aftermath ==
The strikebreakers were escorted out of the city by the National Guard on November 8. They left by train to return to Chicago. The same day, the employees returned to work and normal operations resumed. There was a brief disturbance when pro-union employees refused to work on cars with non-union employees. Ralston immediately interceded in the dispute, and threatened to use the National Guard to run the streetcars until the Indiana Public Service Commission could resolve the dispute. The employees dropped their objections and returned to work. The National Guard remained in the city until November 9 without incident. They demobilized on November 10.

Ralston and Ethelbert Stewart cooperated to formalize a longer-term arbitration agreement, and on November 12 finished work on a binding agreement whereby all employees agreed to continue work and maintain all their former seniority, excepting workers involved in violence—all of whom were to be arrested. The strike had lasted eight days, four strikers and two strikebreakers had been killed, several others shot, and hundreds on both sides were injured during the clashes between the police, rioters, and strikebreakers. The events were the "greatest breakdown in public order ever seen in Indianapolis" according to historian William D. Dalton.

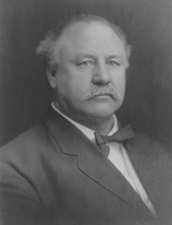
Governor of Indiana Samuel M. Ralston

Sheriff Porttens charged 33 officers with insubordination on November 12 because of their refusal to obey orders during the strike. The police threatened a strike of their own. With the support of Mayor Shank and a petition that received several thousand signatures, the police were permitted to retain their jobs. Sheriff Porttens promptly resigned after 29 years on the force. Indianapolis Mayor Shank resigned from office after the city council threatened impeachment because of his encouragement of the police mutiny. He left office on November 28, four weeks before the end of his term.

When the General Assembly convened in January, Ralston proposed several acts aimed to improve work conditions. Among the laws he promoted, and the Assembly passed, were acts that banned the sale of narcotic drugs for the first time, a minimum wage, and free vaccinations for several prevalent diseases. Ralston successfully lobbied for other improvements to the living conditions of the urban poor that included funding to provide clean running water and children's playgrounds.

The AASEREA submitted a list of twenty-three grievances to the Indiana Public Service Commission on November 14. The arbitration by the commission lasted several months. Progress was initially stalled when the AASEREA objected to the participation of two of the five members of the commission in rendering a decision. The two members eventually agreed to recuse themselves from participation in the arbitration proceedings. The commission issued the final agreement on February 14, 1914. The commission ruled in favor of the Traction and Terminal Company on most of the grievances. The commission ruled that new employees would not be required to join the union, and employees who did not join the union were ineligible to receive the benefits of the arbitration. For the employees, wages were increased from 21 cents to 28 cents per hour—much less than the increase to 35 cents the AASEREA called for. All workers were guaranteed a minimum of $45 per month and at least one Sunday off work each month.

Following the ruling, the company barred the union from soliciting new members on the company property and began offering incentives to new workers to sign contracts wherein they promised not to join the union. The AASEREA objected to the company's policy and the prior agreement required the Public Service Commission rule on the matter. The commission sided with the company on both issues on August 26, 1914, and barred union solicitation on company property, and upheld the right of the company to hire non-union employees.

== See also ==
- History of Indianapolis
- 1892 Indianapolis streetcar strike
- St. Louis streetcar strike of 1900
- Murder of workers in labor disputes in the United States
- List of incidents of civil unrest in the United States
