= 1910 Columbus streetcar strike =

Union strike in Columbus, Ohio in 1910

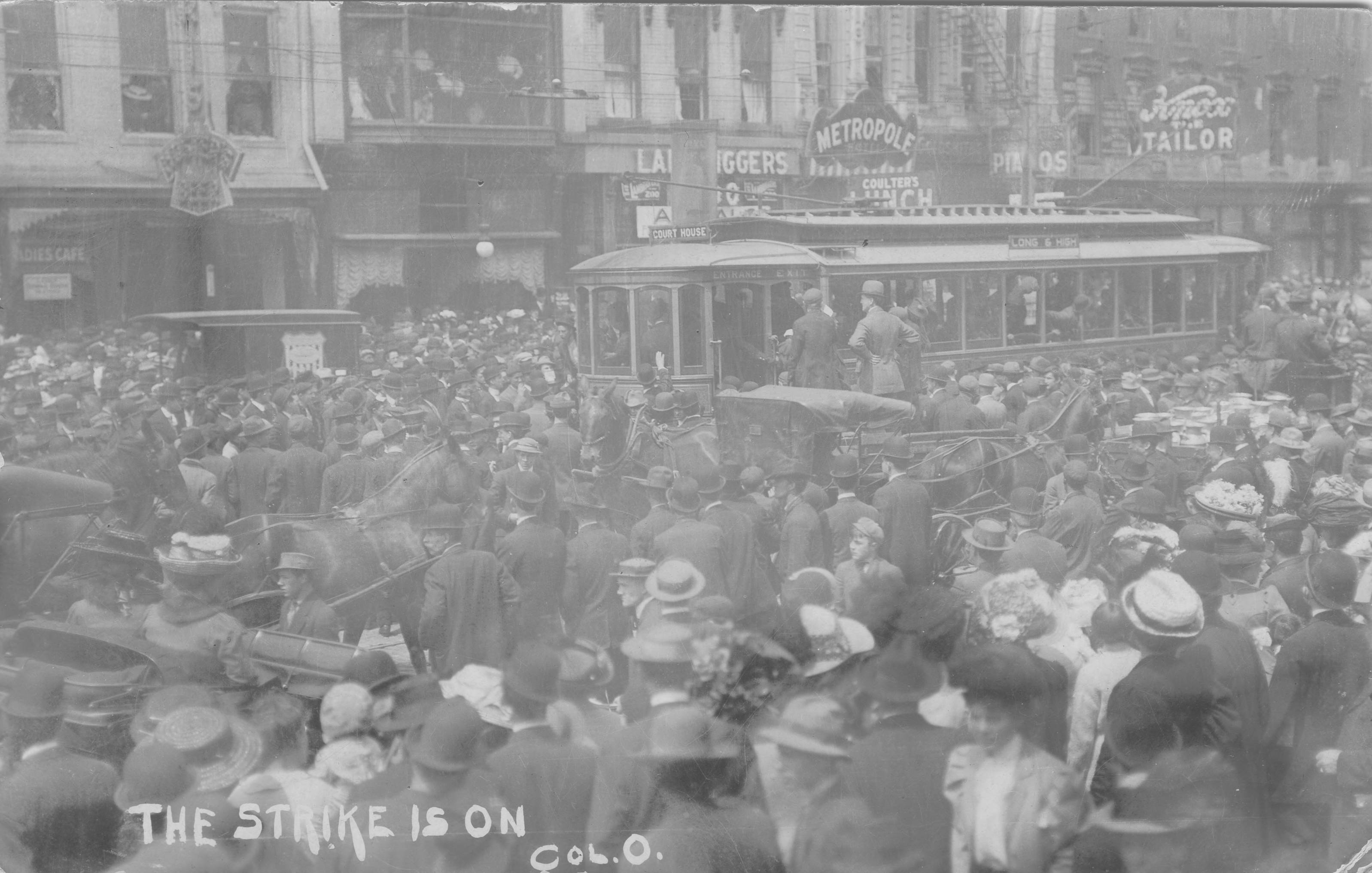
- Crowd during the strike
- Date: July 24 – October 18, 1910
- Location: Columbus, Ohio
- Caused by: Low wages, long hours, fired workers
- Methods: Strike, riot
- Result: Unsuccessful, workers returned to work or left for work elsewhere

Parties
Amalgamated Association of Street and Electric Railway Employees local chapter	Columbus Railway and Light Co. John J. Mahoney Detective Agency

Casualties
- Deaths: 1
- Arrested: at least 24

The 1910 streetcar strike was a union protest against labor practices by the Columbus Railway and Light Co. in Columbus, Ohio, in 1910. The summertime strike began as peaceful protests, but led to thousands rioting throughout the city, injuring hundreds of people.

== Background ==
Conditions for the streetcar workers were difficult at the time. The operators worked for only 19–20 cents per hour, worked 60–65 hours per week, and worked for years without a day off. These conditions led to a high turnover rate, yet the job was not complicated and workers could be easily replaced, prompting the adverse working conditions. The Columbus Railway and Light Co. paid its riders to report on irregular employee activities, and the company would not require hearings before firing employees for dishonesty. In early 1910, 35 employees of the company met with manager E.K. Stewart, requesting increased wages. The company fired the entire group as a result. In March, about half of the Columbus Railway and Light Company's employees formed a local chapter of the Amalgamated Association of Street and Electric Railway Employees labor union. The union sought the reinstatement of the 35 workers, along with pay raises, better working conditions, and job stability. The streetcar company chose a hard-line position, with no compromise offered.

== Strike ==
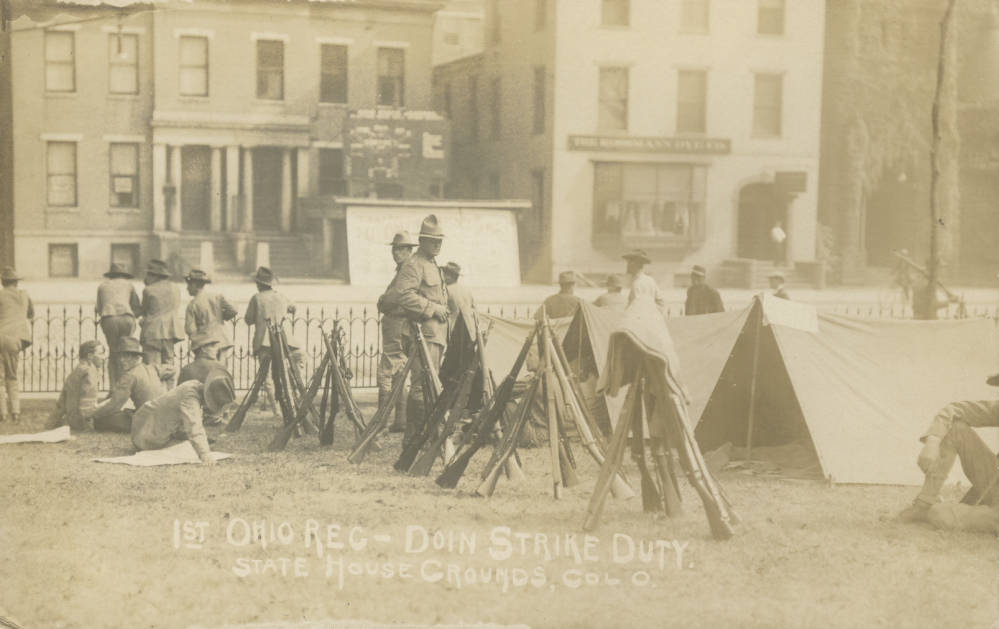
1st Ohio Regiment camp on the Statehouse grounds

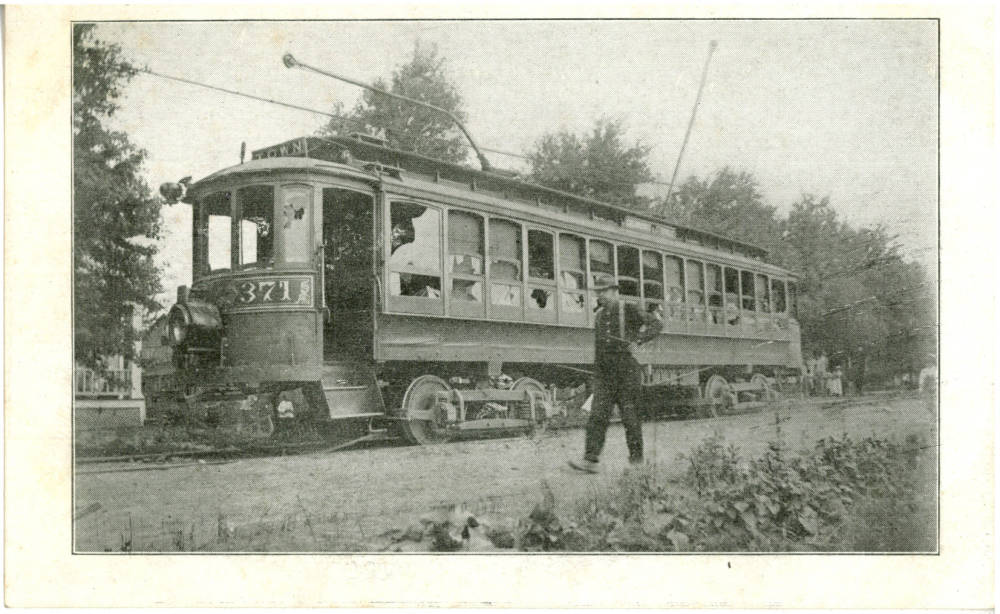
Damaged streetcar after the strike

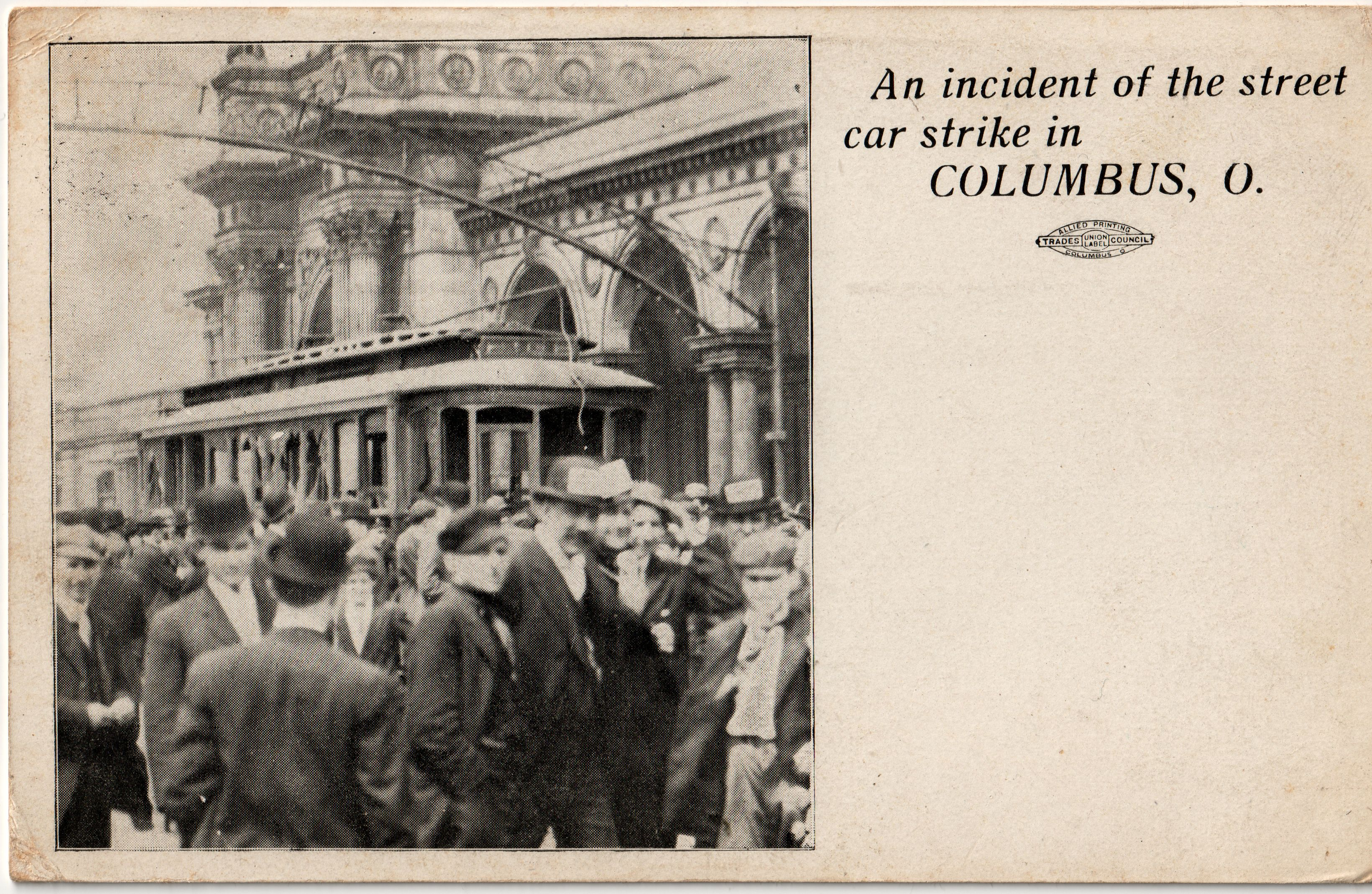
People surround a streetcar during the strike of 1910 in Columbus, Ohio

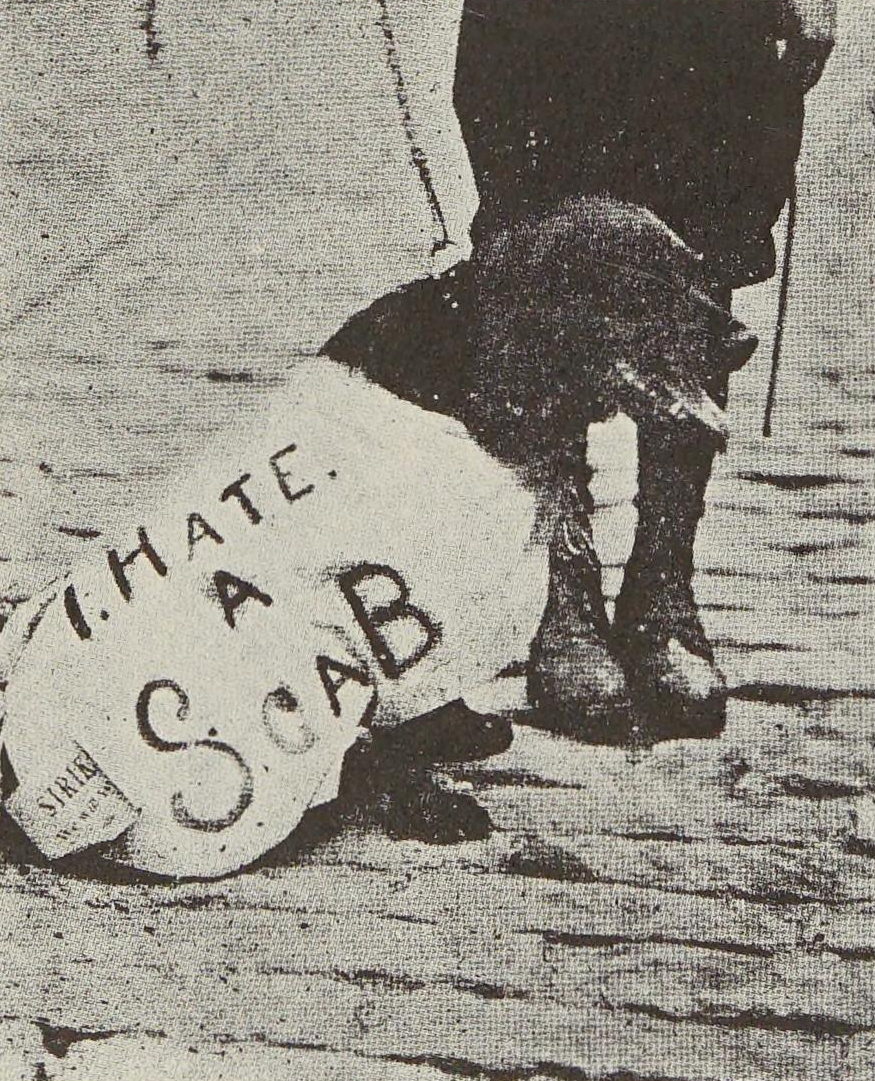
A dog wearing a sign reading "I Hate a Scab" during the strike

The public primarily sided with the union. The Columbus Chamber of Commerce, anticipating conflict, hosted a mandatory meeting between the union and company in June 1910. On July 23, its hearings concluded, finding that both parties were partly at fault, and that a peaceful resolution should be found. The meeting mostly added to tensions, however, and the strike began the next day at 4 am. The union's chapter had grown to 600 members by this point. They planned to not show up for work, instead selling union buttons around the city and picketing the company's streetcar barns. The streetcar company chose to hire strikebreakers at $30 per week, over double the standard wage of $12.50. They also hired a special policing force, supplied by the local John J. Mahoney Detective Agency, to protect the streetcars and facilities. The strike ended up more serious, as crowds barricaded streetcar tracks and threw bricks and rocks into the streetcars. The company police responded with gunfire. That night, 76 people were arrested, though riots continued on the following day. Mayor George Sidney Marshall called in about 5,000 members of the Ohio National Guard. The troops kept order in the city until their departure on August 7. More rioting than took place, with shootings, barricades, stonings, and empty streetcars blown up with dynamite. It led to the National Guard returning, and the union and public more so aiming for a peaceful end to the riots. Still, about 3,000 to 4,000 strikers, sympathizers, and disrupters continued to riot. It led to a bad public image of the city, hurting business activity, and worrying the city planning for a state fair in September. On October 18, the union admitted defeat, and its 570 striking workers either returned to work or moved to work elsewhere in Columbus, or for Cleveland streetcar companies.

== See also ==
- History of Columbus, Ohio
- Public transit in Columbus, Ohio
- Streetcar strikes in the United States
