= Springfield Traction Company =

Past operator of Trams across Springfield Metro

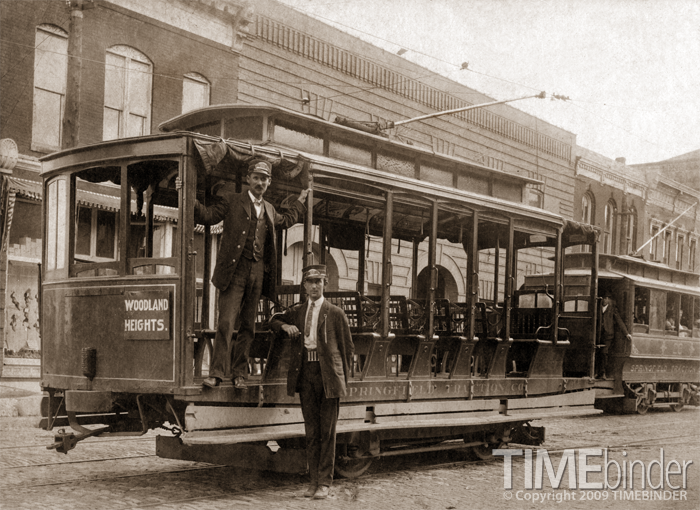

Overview
- Locale: Springfield Metro
- Transit type: Streetcar
- Number of lines: 6 (or more)
- Headquarters: Springfield

Operation
- Train length: 1

Technical
- System length: 23 miles (37 km)

Springfield Traction Company was a company that operated surface Horse, Steam, and Electric Trams and Streetcars across the Springfield Metro from around 1869 to August 1937.

== Lines run ==
The known lines the Springfield Traction Company ran, these lines went from the center of the city, now known as Park Central Square to the city limits in each cardinal directions.

- Woodland Heights Line
- Nichols Street Line
- Park Avenue Line
- Atlantic Street Line
- Doling Park Line
- Broad Street Line

== History ==
The original horse and mule powered street railway in Springfield, Missouri began operation around 1869. It operated on a line connecting the Square to the Commercial Street district along Boonville, then down Benton to what was then the passenger train depot.

By 1929 the electric streetcar system covered what was then the entire city limits, giving citizens access to public transportation. Streetcar lines radiated in four directions from Park Central Square, creating a beehive of activity in the heart of the city.

In 1936, the Springfield Traction Company announced that the next year the electric streetcars would be replaced by gasoline-powered buses. To them, it seemed “the modern thing to do.” A final streetcar parade was held on August 2, 1937, with people cramming into the cars for one last ride.
