= Eva Valesh =

Eva McDonald Valesh
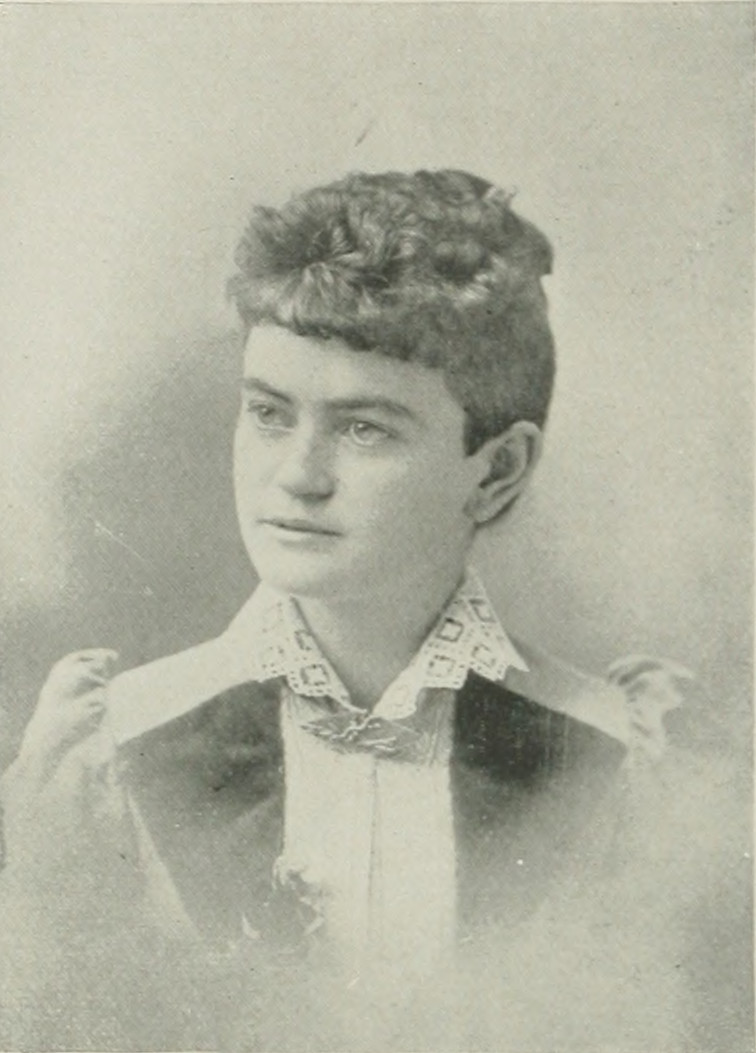
- Valesh, "A Woman of the Century" (c. 1885)
- Born: September 9, 1866; Orono, Maine
- Died: November 7, 1956 (aged 90); Norwalk, Connecticut
- Occupation: Journalist
- Known for: Labor rights activism

Eva McDonald Valesh (September 9, 1866 – November 7, 1956) was an American journalist and labor rights activist. Valesh was an activist for, and reported on conditions of laborers in Minnesota's garment factories. She was also a speaker for the Knights of Labor movement and the National Farmer's Alliance.

== Early life ==
Born Mary Eva McDonald, Valesh was born in Orono, Maine in 1866 to John and Elinor Lane McDonald, a couple of Scotch-Irish origin who had immigrated to the United States by way of Canada. Valesh's father, a carpenter by trade, was politically active. Following the timber business, the family moved to Minnesota when Valesh was 11 or 12 years old. She graduated from a Minneapolis public high school at the age of 15.

Valesh entered teacher-training school. However, she found the profession "dreary," and had difficulty landing a job because of her young age. She began writing for the society pages of the Saturday Evening Spectator but was discouraged by the low pay. Instead, she trained as a typesetter and joined the typographer's labor union while continuing to work for the Saturday Evening Spectator. With the encouragement of her father, Valesh began submitting her writing to the newspaper. In 1888, through the recommendation of Minnesota Knights leader Ignatious Donnelley, Valesh became more involved in the labor union and began to pursue investigative journalism, writing columns for the St. Paul Globe.

== Minnesota journalist and labor activist ==
=== Undercover reporter ===
Valesh started writing a column for the St. Paul Globe under the pseudonym Eva Gay in 1888. Her first piece was titled "'Mong the girls who toil," which opened with: "Working girls and their lives. How little the outside world knows of them. And yet, there are thousands of them in Minneapolis." Valesh wrote of guarded factories, where supervisors sought to prevent information about working conditions and pay from becoming public. As a result, the reporter proposed "to carry Globe readers with me through a series of articles and show the life, home life and shop life, of the working girls and women of Minneapolis." She described the crowded conditions and "stifling" air in three garment factories. Valesh detailed several common themes among the female factory workers she interviewed, including that they were paid by the piece, rather than for their time, that many were self-supporting or supporting other family members with their wages, and that wages had been cut within the past year. Of the women she spoke to, weekly wages averaged from $1.75 to $4 (though some earned as much as $7 or $8 per week), with average room and board costing from $2 to $3 weekly.

According to Rhoda Gilman, writing for Workday Minnesota, a Minnesota-based labor news organization, by the late 1880s, factory work in Minnesota had attracted large numbers of young women from rural areas, with the promise of a more exciting life and the chance for improved pay. However, the "mills and factories that employed them would today be called sweatshops." Two weeks after Valesh's piece came out, women workers at the Shotwell, Clerihew and Lothman garment factory went on strike, in part as a response to a new pay cut. It was the first women's strike in Minnesota, and Valesh gained notice, as some credited her with helping spark the strike. The Knights of Labor, a workers organization, helped organize and encourage the strike. During the 1880's, the organization had gained membership and encouraged strike action across the United States. However, by 1888, the Knights organization was beginning to lose some influence. The strike itself was only partially successful. Public opinion in the weeks following the strike generally supported the women workers, with some newspapers hailing the "striking maidens." In a bid to draw workers in, the company promised to pay new workers a minimum of $3 per week, up from $2. However, the company refused to fire a supervisor some of the workers considered abusive, nor guarantee that all the women could have their jobs back. As time went on, many of the women found work elsewhere, and some people boycotted the products of the factory. A few months later, the factory shut down.

On April 15, 1888, another Valesh column,"Working in the wet," was published. This article exposed conditions in several laundry works in Minneapolis. In the column, she reported that conditions were very poor. She described how a laundry had several tiers of work, with the wash room being particularly wet, hot and poorly ventilated. Within it, many of the workers were foreign-born. "It's no good to hire American girls to run these heavy machines, those girls wear out too quick," explained one interviewee. Valesh went undercover to one laundry, posing as a job applicant. She found that starting wages as a sorter taking in the bales of soiled laundry were $3.25 per week, with the chance to make $4.25 weekly with experience. The bookkeeper explained that women were expected to work around ten hours per day, five days a week, but could work sitting down and earn a year-end bonus after a few years of service to round pay up to $5 per week. When Valesh spoke to the workers, she found a different story, with the women often working up to 12 hours per day, not the advertised 10, that the hard physical work precluded sitting down, and that very few workers lasted long enough at the job to earn the promised bonus.

Additional columns on similar themes followed. The recurring column often featured Valesh going undercover to see conditions for herself, trying out unskilled domestic work, various types of factory jobs and clerk positions. Valesh appeared so young and unassuming that she could easily go undetected. Factories that employed women in Minnesota began to pay attention, and tried to avoid being "tricked" by the young reporter. However, she was able to slip into workplaces without consequence for more than a year.

Even as Valesh began traveling and speaking, she continued to work for the Globe as editor of the labor section. She directed the coverage of the Minneapolis and St Paul street railway strike of 1889. Later, Valesh worked for the Minneapolis Tribune.

In 1895, Valesh traveled to Europe, intending to write about factory conditions there. She was reportedly shocked by the terrible working conditions and by the number of mothers who worked at the factories. She was able to finance most of the trip by selling these articles, some of which appeared in the American Federationist.

=== Speeches and activism ===
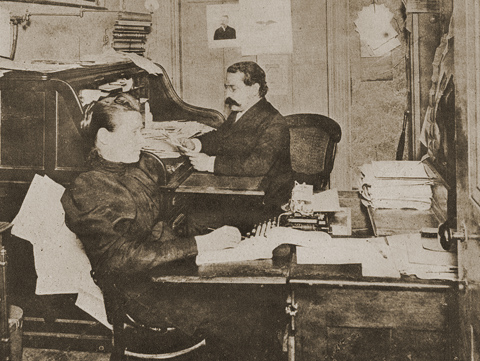
Samuel Gompers, Valesh's mentor and president of the American Federation of Labor in 1887. Pictured with unidentified co-worker in the AFL office.

By 1889, Valesh was more directly involved with the Knights of Labor and the Farmers' Alliance and the following year, she joined the Alliance and Populist campaign lecture circuit throughout the Midwest and New York. She advocated for an eight-hour workday. Valesh was not the only woman speaking on behalf of populist labor causes. Both the Knights of Labor and the Farmers' Alliance sought female members and elevated woman speakers; Valesh's peers included lecturers Sue Ross Keenan of Oregon and Emma DeVoe of Illinois.

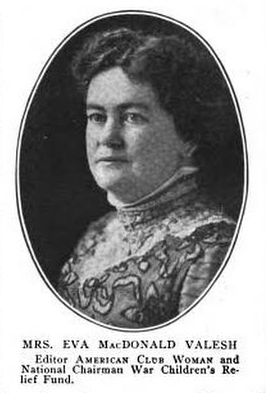
Eva MacDonald Valesh, from a 1916 publication.

Within a few years, Valesh became associated with the American Federation of Labor (AFL). In 1891, Valesh was invited by Samuel Gompers, then the president of the AFL, to speak at the national convention, which took place in Birmingham, Alabama. She delivered a lecture, titled "Women's Work." She also toured with Gompers, speaking alongside him. In one such speech, Valesh spoke in Indianapolis on October 1, 1891 to a crowd of female factory workers. She pointed out that female workers were paid half as much as men, that their wages often did not cover the cost of living, and that the respect women may once have been afforded as industrious members of a small community was gone. Women were denied the right to vote, and treated as cheap and dispensable labor:

Life is simply a tug and a struggle to keep the wolf from the door, with none of the sunbeams to drive out the shadows. When my grandma was a girl, she was accounted the belle of the little village in which she lived, because she had the reputation of spinning three miles of flax a day. What round of the social ladder could her granddaughter occupy today if she worked in a factory, no matter if she spun 1000 miles of flax a day? Society has no round for the working girl of today, not even a bottom round. There is no economic reason why women should be forced into the factory or shop. Employers argue they can obtain the services of women for less money than they can that of a man. I don't doubt that, and I don't blame employers for wanting to have their labor done at the cheapest cost. But the more I study this labor question, the greater am I impressed with the fact that human machinery is ever on the decrease. If an old loom wears out or a wheel breaks, it costs $20,000 probably to repair the damage, but if a woman breaks down, she is cast out and twenty fresh others step up to take her place at the same old starvation wages.

In 1893, Valesh spoke at the Chicago World's Fair before an audience of 25,000 union-members.

=== Political career ===
In 1888, at the age of 22, Valesh ran as a Democrat for the Minneapolis School Board. She was the first woman to ever run for the position and did not win. Although women were allowed to vote in school board elections, some women voters considered her too working-class.

Valesh spoke on behalf of the Farmer's Alliance during the 1890 elections, and was subsequently elected by Farmer's Alliance members to the position of state lecturer for the Minnesota chapter in January, 1891. Later that year, she was elected assistant national lecturer for the Alliance.

In 1896, she introduced populist presidential candidate William Jennings Bryan when he campaigned in Minnesota.

== Return to the East Coast ==
Shortly after her reporting trip to Europe in 1895, Valesh moved to Washington D.C. and lived with Samuel Gompers and his wife, Sophie. She worked at the AFL head office and continued reporting.

=== Muckraking reporter ===
By 1897, through a connection at the Minneapolis Tribune, Valesh was able to secure a low-level reporting job at the New York Journal, a William Randolph Hearst publication. She moved to New York City and worked in the city room of the paper. At first, the job was a struggle. Valesh was an outsider with few connections and was paid only if her pieces appeared in print, and then only by the number of inches of space the print took up. Although she was able to get some small pieces published, by the end of her first three months, she believed her position at the paper was becoming untenable. One of her editors, Charles Edwards, was against women reporters, saying of her, according to Valesh, that "I just don't like a woman on the paper, that's all. I've got nothing against that girl." Another editor, she discovered, had given her an "impossible assignment" that several other reporters had already failed to do, with the plan of firing her for cause when she could not complete it. The assignment was to identify a young woman who had committed suicide by drinking carbolic acid and write an article about her. Through a connection, Valesh was able to discover the identity of the woman and write the article, saving her job and paving the way for better subsequent assignments.

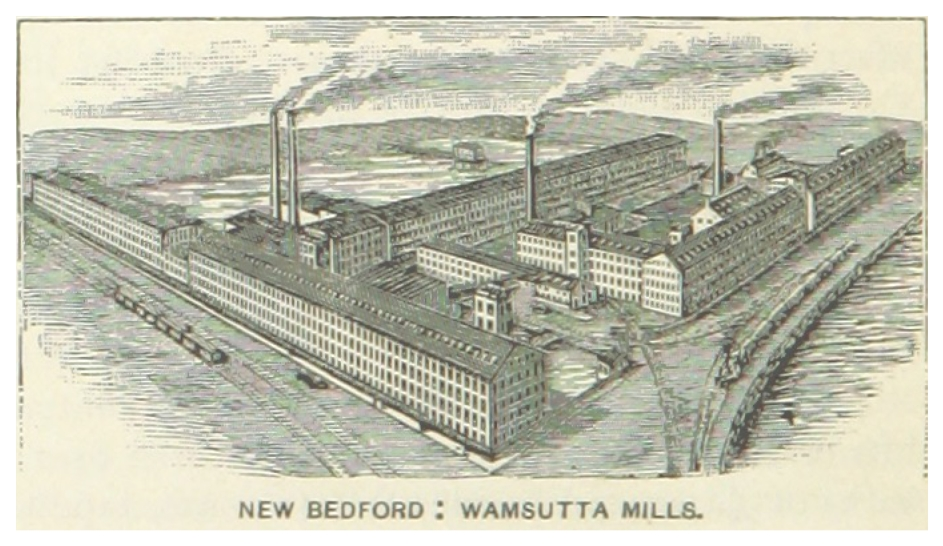
Drawing depicting the Wamsutta textile mill in 1891, one of the mills that employed the New Bedford workers whose strike was covered by Eva Valesh on behalf of the New York Journal

At the beginning of 1898, Hearst personally assigned Valesh to cover a group of female textile workers striking in New Bedford, Massachusetts. The publisher tasked her with covering the strike with an eye for the "sensational." The paper followed the strike in sympathetic detail, reporting on January 24, 1898, for example, that the women workers, coming to pick up a final paycheck before going out on strike, were forced to wait outside in the rain, rather than being allowed inside as usual. Valesh herself became more of a figure at the newspaper, with Hearst rebranding the reporter with the official-sounding title: "international labor commissioner." Valesh did not remain a disinterested observer, and testified on behalf of a bill she helped write to address the grievances of the striking weavers before the Massachusetts state legislature in early February of that year. The bill's easy passage was hailed as a victory by the New York Journal, which claimed credit for helping resolve the strike. In fact, the law was for investigative purposes only, with no power to compel owners or workers to resolve their differences.

Valesh, however, was able to parlay her newfound influence into an interview with President William McKinley. When the article ran in the newspaper, the headline described Valesh as an "expert," meeting with the president to deliver her first-hand account and impressions of the strike. The newspaper published a photograph of Valesh alongside the president. Despite the theatrics, Alice Fahs, historian and author of "Out on Assignment: Newspaper Women and the Making of the Modern Public Space" described the article as "rather bland" and "innocuous." To ameliorate the conditions of the workers, McKinley advocated for increased immigration restriction, while musing on the business demands of the mill owners. In the aftermath, Fahs notes, Valesh continued to insert herself into coverage of the strike, "trumpeting her own achievements" and "self-promoting." Valesh was committed to a style of reporting promulgated by Hearst, a "journalism that acts," and continued to involve herself in the New Bedford strike. She was allowed to cross-examine mill owners and workers during a hearing on a bill in the Massachusetts legislature on regulations for the mill's practice of worker fines, one of the major issues at the heart of the strike. Despite Valesh's work, some of the local strike leaders believed that Valesh did not understand their point of view or share their priorities. On February 10, 1898, the Fall River Herald described Valesh as a woman who was "conspicuous largely because of her nerve and frequently uttered disbeliefs in the truth of anything that is said by anyone but herself."

=== American Federation of Labor ===
Valesh's attention was redirected from New Bedford following the explosion of the USS Maine in February 1889. Her editor reassigned her to cover the unfolding story in Cuba, and she sailed to the island aboard a Standard Oil-owned yacht, the Anita, alongside some U.S. senators and their wives. She served as the official hostess for the trip. Upon her return to New York, Valesh hurt her back in an accident and was unable to work for a time. This precipitated her return to Washington D.C., where she rejoined her mentor and sometime boss, Samuel Gompers. For some months in 1889 and 1900, she earned her living as a ghostwriter for political figures, started a political newsletter and became a columnist. She later described this time as the happiest period of her life.

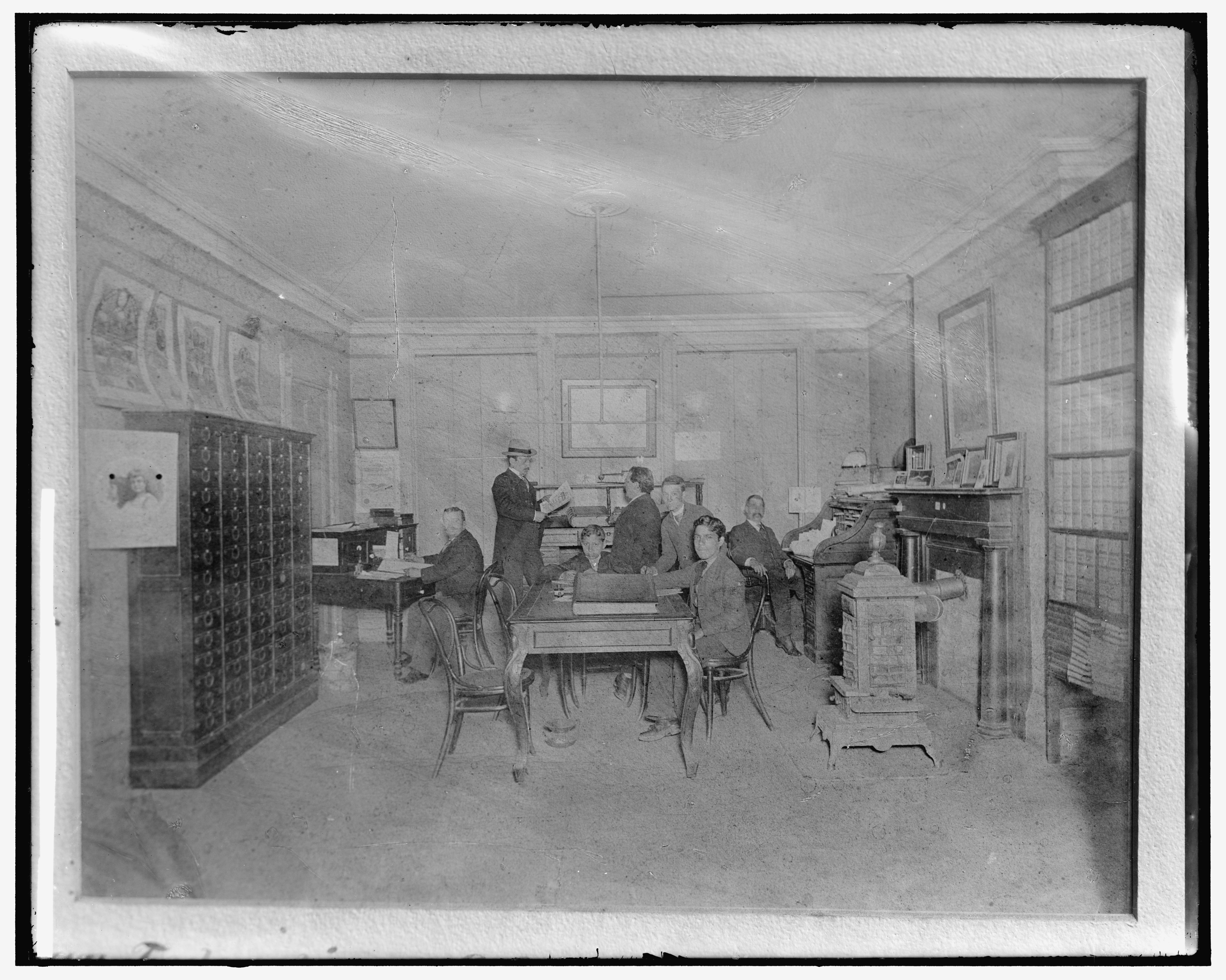
Offices of the American Federation of Labor, early 1900s

By 1900, Valesh was officially hired by Gompers to work for the AFL. At the time, she was the third highest paid member of the organization, at $16/week, and held the title "general organizer." Valesh mostly focused on writing for and editing the labor-affiliated publication The American Federationalist. Although Valesh and Gompers worked on behalf of labor, they tried to separate themselves from some of the socialist ideology prevalent in other parts of the labor movement. As a contributor to The American Federationalist, Valesh advocated against child labor, welfare programs and unemployment insurance, believing these reforms would weaken the character of the American worker.

Valesh worked for the AFL for eight years, however tension developed with Gompers. Elizabeth Faue, who authored a biography of Valesh, surmised that issues arose both because of differing personal styles between the two and as a result of the larger social context within which the pair worked. While Gompers was considered an "axe" of an editor, excising any superfluous detail, Valesh preferred to add more to the article and insert her personality. This had allowed her to develop a following for her work in the past. However, she was usually unable to write under her own byline for the Federationalist, obscuring the depth of her contributions. Valesh also chafed under the sexism and social confinement that held back her ambitions at the organization. While she was Gompers' "right-hand man," according to Faue, and a dedicated activist, Gompers did not allow her name to appear on the masthead of the publication, and acknowledged her publicly only as his aide.

=== Increasing conservatism ===
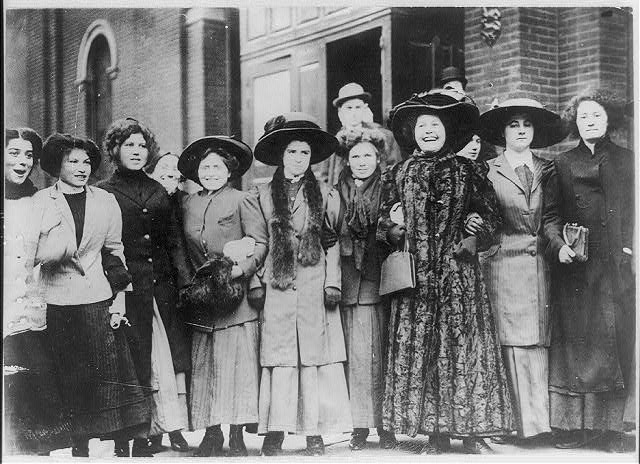
Women workers of the New York shirtwaist strike, in 1909

During her tenure, Valesh expanded the publication's focus on the women's labor movement and the impact of child labor. She seized an opportunity, during a period when Gompers traveled out of the country, to add her name to the masthead with the assistant editor title. When Gompers returned in 1909, he rebuked Valesh, and she resigned. While this event may have been the final blow, by 1908, Valesh had already begun building new ties to a wealthy class of New Yorkers. She spoke at the Colony Club, an elite venue, and tried to persuade the wives and daughters of industrialists to take an interest in improving worker conditions. Valesh became involved with the Women's Trade Union League, an organization founded in 1903 to represent the interests of women in the labor movement. The league counted as members both working class and upper class women, including Alva Vanderbilt Belmont and Anne Tracy Morgan, whose contingent of socialite women was nick-named the "mink brigade" within the movement.

However, on January 28, 1910, Valesh made a fiery speech, essentially accusing the League of being in the pocket of radical socialists. The League was heavily involved with helping the women workers of the shirtwaist strike in New York. In her speech, she accused the strike committee of being dominated by socialist interests, rather than looking out for the workers:

What is that strikers' committee? Eighteen men and two girls were present the day I saw them -- the men all socialists, connected with the trade perhaps, but ignorant of what the girls want. And to show you the feminine view point, those girl strikers are actually grateful to the men who are using them for their own purposes. "It's so nice of the men, who know so much more than we, to serve on our committees," they say. I propose to start a campaign against socialism. This strike may be used to pave the way for forming clean, sensible labor unions, and I want to enroll every woman of leisure, every clubwoman, in the movement. The existing unions aren't doing what they ought to stem the tide of socialism in this country. The Woman's Trade Union League is dominated by socialism, though I won't deny they have helped the shirtwaist strikers some. Socialism is a menace, and it is alarming to one who has been, as I have, away from New York for some years, to come back and see how socialism has grown here. I've been down to Clinton Hall, and I am terrified at the spirit that fills the people that congregate there. There's nothing constructive about socialism.

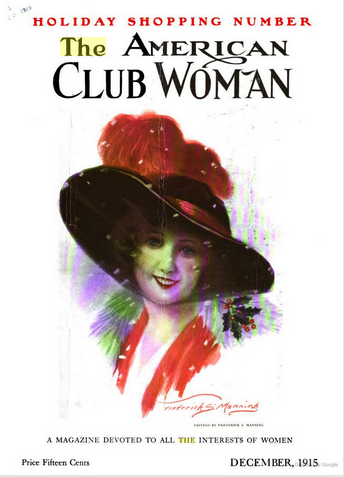
Front cover of The American Club Woman for the December 1915 issue. Valesh was the founder and editor-in-chief of the publication during its run from 1911 to 1919.

Following the speech, members of the League refused to attend a conference Valesh had organized in March, 1910 to discuss labor issues. Subsequently, some leaders of the League began agitating for Valesh's expulsion. Valesh tendered her resignation and disaffiliated from the organization; however the league held a meeting (which Valesh did not attend) to try and sentence her to expulsion anyway. One of Valesh's associates among the upper class reformers, Anne Morgan, was forced to publicly disavow Valesh's position and Valesh became less and less involved with these wealthy, reform-minded women. According to Valesh's biographer, Elizabeth Faue, Valesh had attempted to moderate between the working class girls driving the labor struggle forward, and the sympathetic, but more removed, upper class women she had begun to associate with. Instead, the workers began to distrust Valesh's motives. Once Valesh lost her place at the center of the labor struggle, she held little interest to her former wealthy friends. As an ambitious woman of working class origins, Valesh had difficulty finding her own place within the social strata of the movement.

=== The club movement ===
In 1911, Valesh embarked on a new venture, publishing the magazine The American Club Woman. The magazine was published monthly, with Valesh serving as president and editor-in-chief. The magazine more closely hewed to Valesh's conservative brand of activism, while also covering topics of general interest. The magazine attempted to represent the interests of women involved in the club movement, the drive for civic clubs for women of middle and upper classes to participate in various social, political and educational activities. Many clubs of the period were focused on local issues, such as schools, food safety and community service. For example, in January, 1914, in a letter from the editor, Valesh advocated for allowing schools to remain open at night as social and civic centers for children, prison reform, increased kitchen sanitation and awareness of the number of adulterated food products being sold at the time. Valesh also helped organize relief funds for children and families affected by the war starting in 1914. In 1918, the magazine stopped publishing, after its financial backer ran out of money. Valesh suffered a heart attack in 1919 at the age of 53, but survived.

Valesh's activities slowed down after this point. She worked as a copy editor for The New York Times starting in 1925, until a few years before her death in Norwalk, Connecticut on November 7, 1956.

== Personal life ==
In 1891, Valesh married labor politician and trade unionist Frank Valesh. Together, they had one son, Frank.
