= 1900 St. Louis streetcar strike =

St. Louis streetcar strike
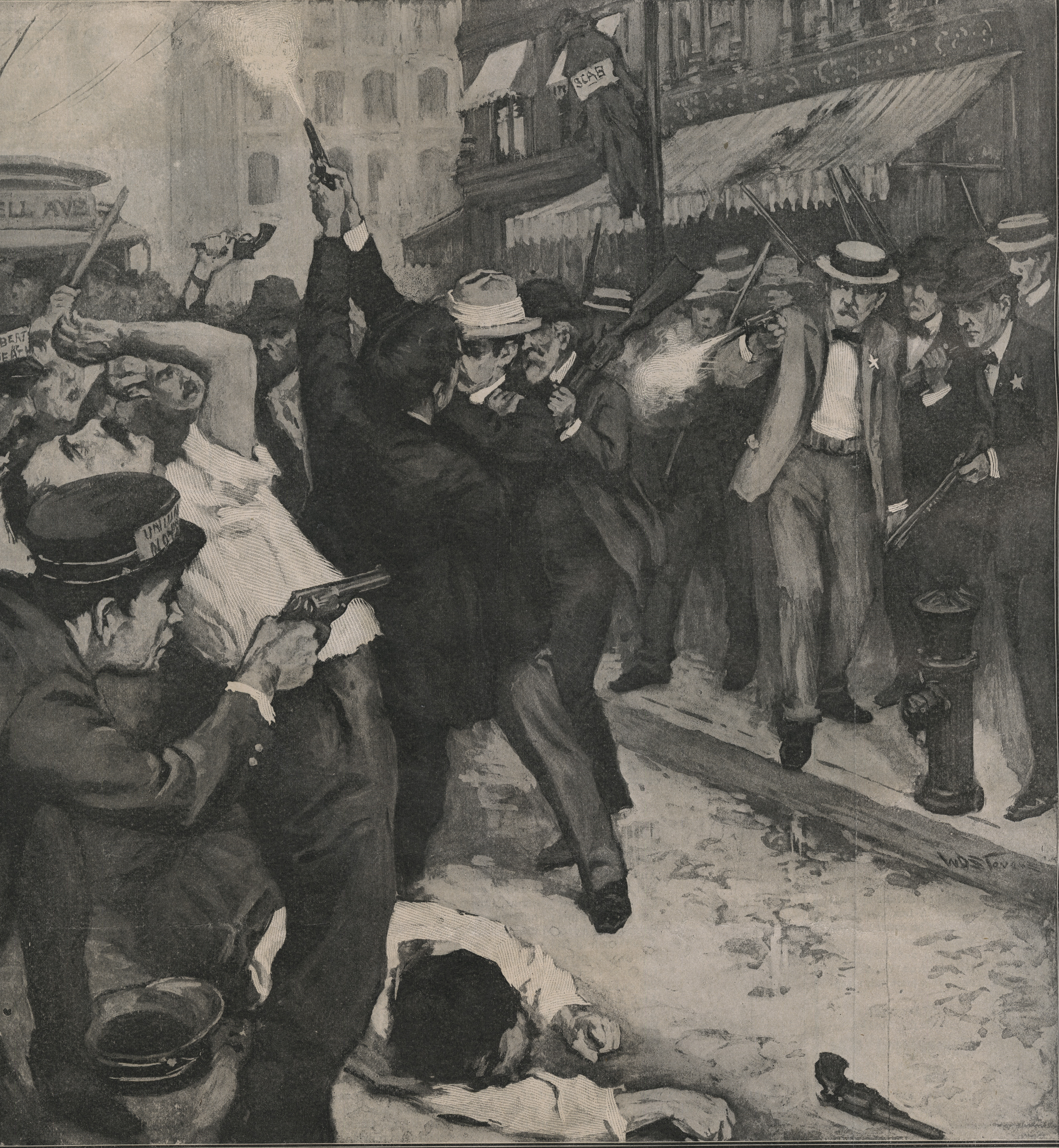
- Fatal conflict between strikers and posse comitatus
- Date: May 9, 1900 – September 14, 1900
- Location: St. Louis, Missouri
- Methods: Striking

Parties
Amalgamated Association of Street Railway Employees of America	St. Louis Transit Company; Metropolitan Police; Posse comitatus

Lead figures
	Edwards Whitaker; John H. Cavender

Number
3,000 Workers	1,000 Policemen; 2,500 Posse comitatus

Casualties
- Deaths: 14
- Injuries: 200

The St. Louis streetcar strike of 1900 was a labor action, and resulting civil disruption, against the St. Louis Transit Company by a group of three thousand workers unionized by the Amalgamated Street Railway Employees of America.

Between May 7 and the end of the strike in September, 14 people had been killed, and 200 wounded.

== Background ==
Until 1899 there had been ten independent streetcar operating companies in St. Louis, providing regular transit service in the fourth-largest city in the United States. (Note: After New York City, Philadelphia & Chicago) That year, those ten lines were consolidated into two: the St. Louis & Suburban Railway, and the St. Louis Transit Company, headed by Edwards Whitaker.

Under pressure of long hours, low pay, and poor working conditions, the employees of both lines attempted to unionize as Local 131. Whitaker fired his 3,300 workers summarily and was soon running streetcars only with the help of the St. Louis Metropolitan Police Department, who had volunteered up to a thousand men for that duty.

== Civil disruption ==
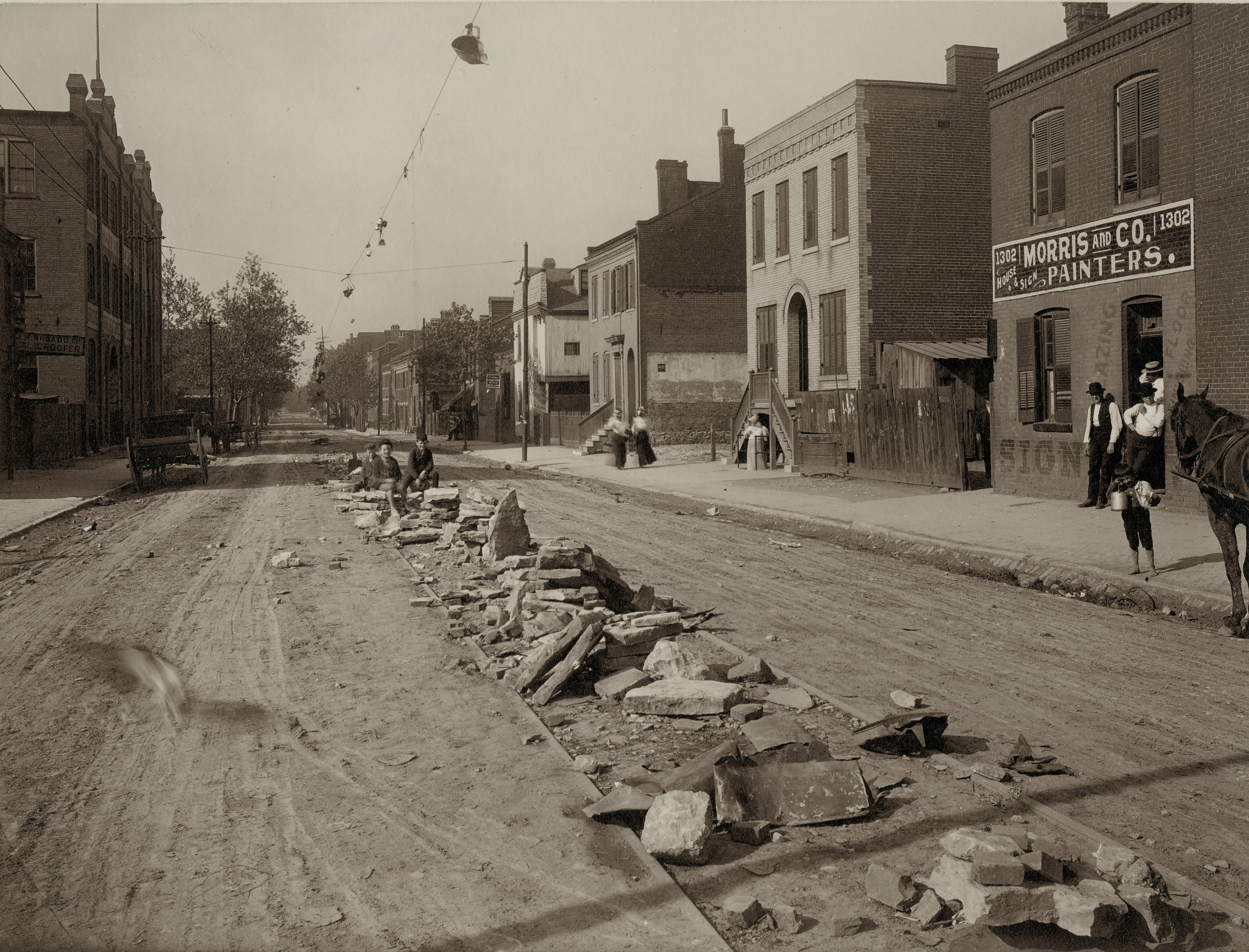
Stones piled on tracks and debris on overhead cables during strike.

On the first day of the strike, May 9, the St. Louis Republic reported a full page of riot conditions across the entire city: multiple bystanders shot, an attempted lynching, a crowded streetcar being stoned by a mob sympathetic to the strikers, and policemen assaulted with thrown bricks and bottles.

Strikers sought to disrupt service by cutting cables, lighting bonfires, and piling boulders, rubble, and other obstructions onto the tracks. St. Louis had significant union membership, and many working-class citizens shut down the lines in their own neighborhoods in solidarity.

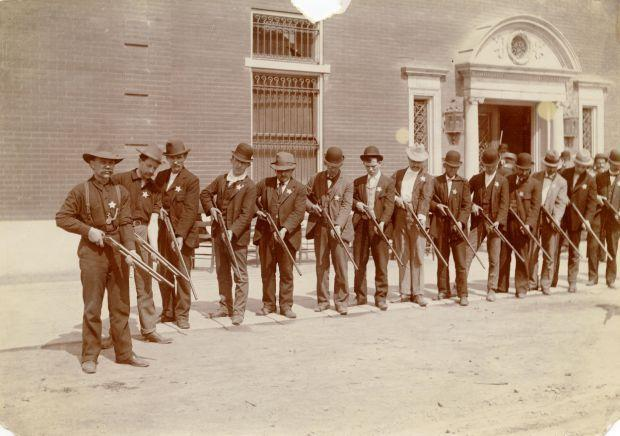
A gathering of armed deputized civilians that patrolled streetcars during the 1900 streetcar strike. Many of its members rode on the cars with their shotguns.

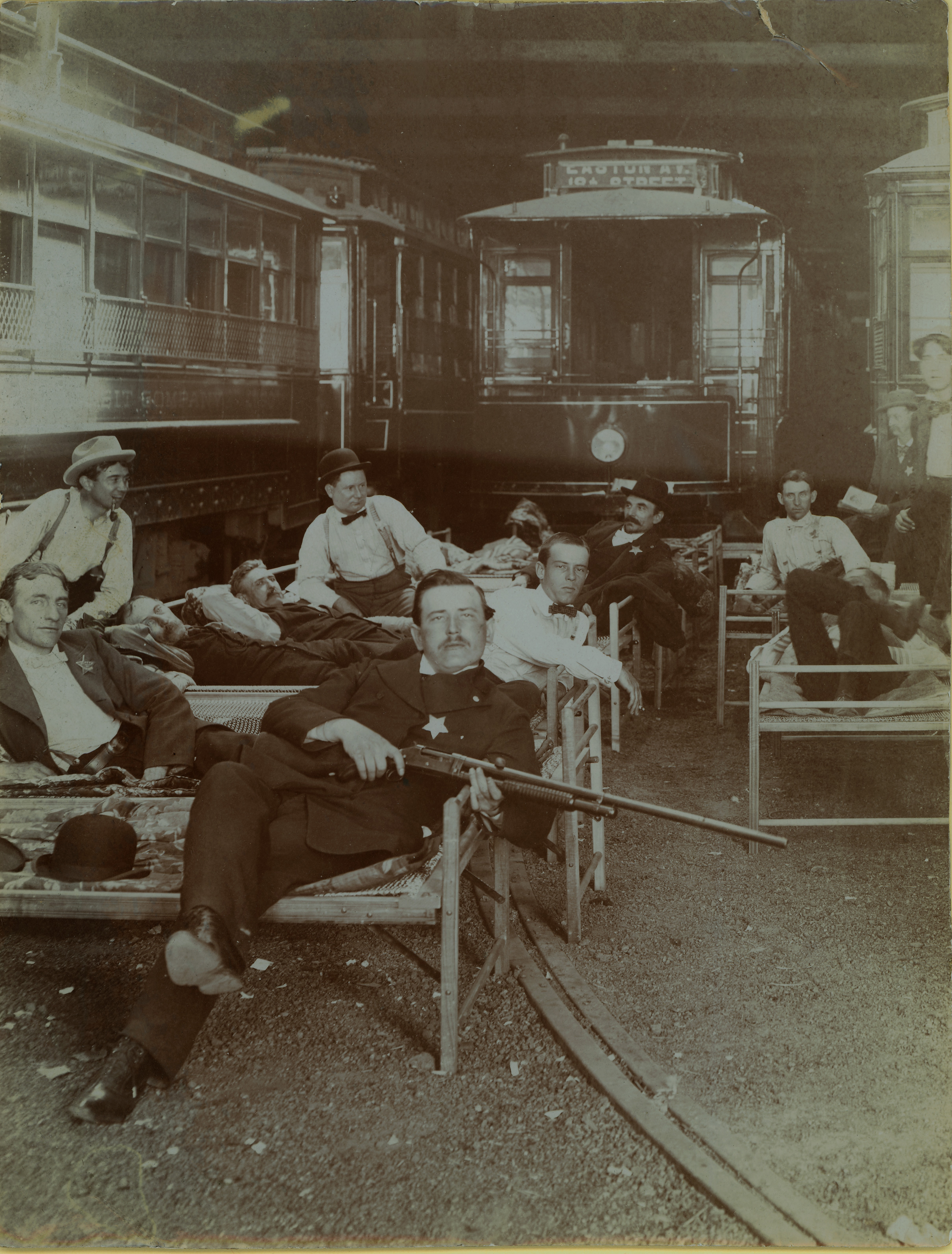
St. Louis sheriff's deputies and Posse members resting on cots in the United Railway car barn.

On May 29 Whitaker's own attorney wrote to a local labor commissioner lamenting the increasing lawlessness in the city stated that: "On Wednesday last a transit car, without a light about it, was loaded with armed men, and while the car was running at a rapid speed by the corner of Mississippi and Park Aves., the men in the car, absolutely without a shadow of provocation, fired into a hall 100 feet away in which a few striking employes were assembled, and several people on the streets were wounded and the lives of many were endangered. Last Thursday night a similar unprovoked outrage was committed at the corner of Compton and Park Aves., where several citizens, some not connected with the strike, were seriously wounded. Other outrages of this nature could be cited, which were committed by ruffians armed by the company and loaded on its cars and scattered through the city."

The Police Board swore in 2,500 citizens in a posse comitatus commanded by a local realty agent, John H. Cavender, who had played a similar paramilitary role in the bloody 1877 Saint Louis general strike. On the evening of June 10, men of that posse fatally shot three strikers returning from a picnic, leaving 14 others wounded. A dozen or more eyewitnesses disputed the sheriff's statement that they'd been armed. For their part the strikers made three unsuccessful attempts to dynamite the housing for the temporary workers in the car barns at Easton and Prairie Avenues. On July 2, Whittaker signed an agreement to take back the workers and let them unionize, but then reneged on the deal.

The strike sputtered to a close in September with no advantage to the exhausted workers.

But the strike indirectly led to the "sensational exposures of the boodle ring". A young lawyer named Joseph W. Folk represented the striking workers in the settlement, was soon working as the city prosecutor pursuing the city's corrupt Democratic boss Edward Butler, and by 1904 was Governor of Missouri. The same spirit of reform saw the election of Mayor Rolla Wells on a reform platform, and an exposé of St. Louis corruption by Lincoln Steffens published in McClure's in 1902 (later collected in The Shame of the Cities), said to be the first example of muckraking journalism.

Whitaker thrived as a St. Louis businessman—in 1910 he became president of Boatmen's Bank.

Similar streetcar labor actions with similar results happened in Cleveland in 1899 and Indianapolis in 1913. St. Louis streetcar workers would strike again in 1918.

== See also ==
- Murder of workers in labor disputes in the United States
- 1877 St. Louis general strike
- 1892 Indianapolis streetcar strike
