= Midori Naka =

Japanese actress (1909-1945)

- Midori Naka
- Born: Midori Naka; 19 June 1909; Chūō, Tokyo, Japan
- Died: 24 August 1945 (aged 36); Tokyo, Japan
- Occupation: Actress
- Years active: 1928–1945

Midori Naka (仲みどり; 19 June 1909 – 24 August 1945) was a Japanese stage actress of the Shingeki style. She initially survived the atomic bombing of Hiroshima on 6 August 1945, but died 18 days later. She was the first person in the world whose death was officially certified to be a result of radiation poisoning. Her notability helped publicize the adverse effects of exposure to radiation and encouraged more research on this area.

== Biography ==
=== Early life and acting career ===
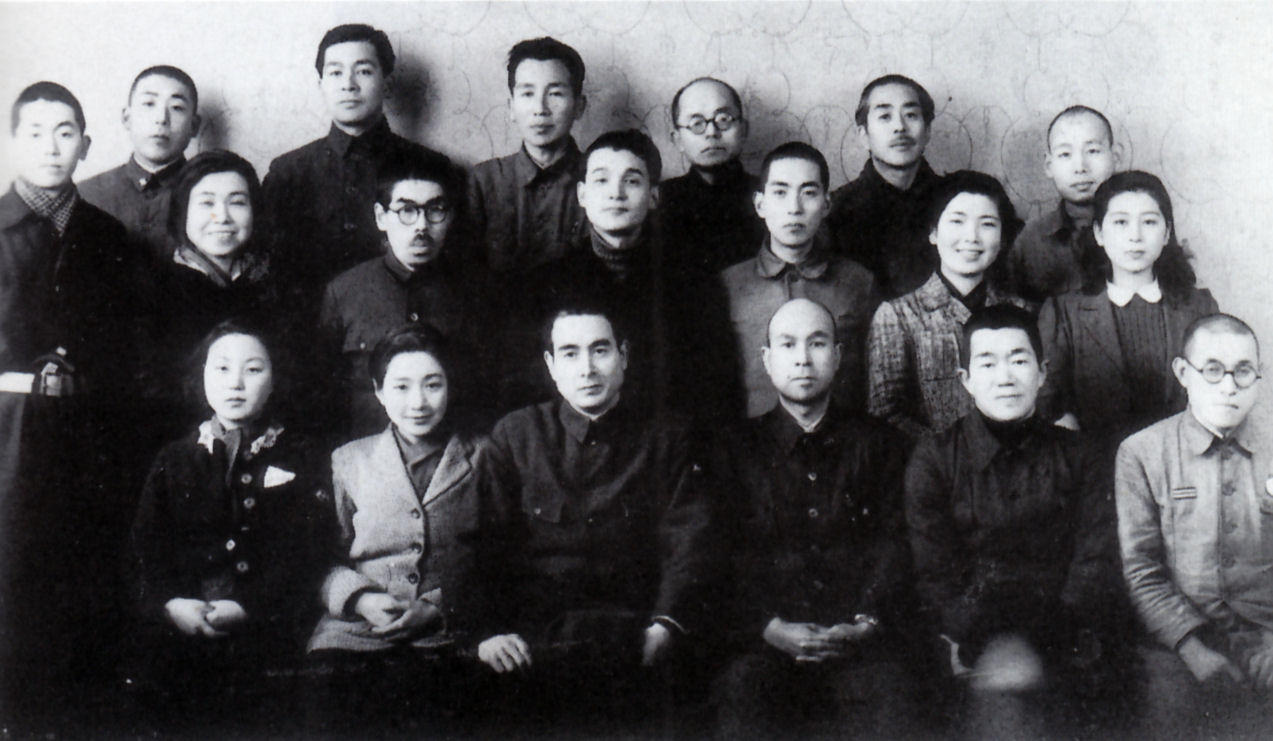
Midori Naka (far left in the middle row) in a January 1945 photo of the Sakura Corps that includes several members who died later that year at Hiroshima.

Midori (Japanese for "green") Naka was born in the Nihonbashi district of Chūō, Tokyo in Japan, the third of four daughters of a military officer. She graduated from Osaka Jogakuin College, before joining the Asakusa samurai drama group in 1928. In 1931, she entered the newly formed Tsukiji Shokekijo (Tsukiji Little Theater) and distinguished herself as an actress of the Shingeki style, especially for her performances as the titular character in the production of Lady of the camellias. In the mid-1930s, she helped her sisters run a coffee shop in the Asakusa district in Tokyo. In 1940, the Tsukiji troupe was shut down by the police. She joined the Kuraku-za (Pain and Pleasure) theater company in 1942. Tokyo air raids made activity difficult, and the troupe disbanded in January 1945. In March 1945, Naka became lead actress in the Sakura-tai (Japanese for "Cherry Blossom Unit"), a newly formed mobile theater group organized by actor Sadao Maruyama.

=== Hiroshima bombing ===
Together with the Sakura-tai troupe, Naka moved to Hiroshima on 7 June 1945, intent on spending the season there. The nine members of the troupe rented a house that was located about 650 metres (2,130 ft) from the ground zero of the atomic bombing of August 1945. They shared this house with members of another theater troupe of six members, the Sangoza.

Naka and sixteen of her colleagues were at the house in Hiroshima on 6 August 1945, when an atomic bomb detonated over the city. Thirteen of the seventeen actors were killed instantly. Naka survived, along with Sadao Maruyama, Keiko Sonoi and Shozo Takayama. Naka later described her experience:

When it happened, I was in the kitchen, since it was my turn to make breakfast for the company that morning. I was wearing a light housecoat, colored red and white and had a scarf tied about my head. When a sudden white light filled the room, my first reaction was that the hot water boiler must have exploded. I immediately lost consciousness. When I came to, I was in darkness and I gradually became aware that I was pinned beneath the ruins of the house. When I tried to work my way free, I realized that apart from my small panties, I was entirely naked. I ran my hand over my face and back: I was uninjured! Only my hands and legs were slightly scratched. I ran just as I was to the river, where everything was in flames. I jumped into the water and floated downstream. After a few hundred yards, some soldiers fished me out.

=== Illness and death ===
A few days later, thanks to her fame as an actress, Naka was able to find a seat into one of the rare trains that were then travelling to the capital. On August 16, Naka voluntarily entered the hospital of Tokyo University where she was examined by some of the foremost radiation experts in Japan at the time. In the hospital, she was given repeated blood transfusions by the doctors in an attempt to save her life. At the beginning of her hospitalization, her body temperature was 37.8 °C and her pulse 80 bpm. In the following days, her hair began to fall out and her white blood cell count sank from the normal count of 8,000 to 300–400 (other sources indicate 500 to 600 white blood cells), much to the surprise of the doctors. Her red blood cell count was at the 3,000,000 level. By August 21, her body temperature and pulse had risen to 41 °C and 158 bpm respectively. On August 23, twelve to thirteen purple patches appeared upon her body. The same day, Naka maintained she felt better. However, she died the following day, on 24 August 1945. She was the last surviving member of Sakura-tai; all three other survivors had already died by then, also due to radiation poisoning. Naka provided the first testimony of the Hiroshima bombing to be widely publicized in the media.

== Legacy ==
Midori Naka was the first person in the world whose death was officially certified to be a result of "atomic bomb disease" (radiation poisoning). Journalist Robert Jungk argues that the publicity surrounding the illness of Midori Naka, owing to her status as a public figure, was instrumental in catapulting the so-called "radiation sickness" to the public eye. Until Naka's story came forward, there was confusion and obscurity surrounding the mysterious "new sickness" from which many of the atomic bombing survivors were suffering. Jungk argues that, thanks to the prominence of Naka and her personal story, proper investigation and examination of the radiation poisoning phenomenon commenced, potentially saving the lives of many of the people exposed to radiation during the bombings.

On 11 September 1945, the results of 37 autopsies of bomb victims conducted by the scientific team of Kyoto University were confiscated by the US Army General Thomas Farrell. The confiscated material removed to the United States included the remains of Naka. Her remains were carefully studied and were returned to Japan in 1972, in a set of glass preserving jars. They are since exhibited in the Hiroshima Peace Memorial.

French poet Jacques Gaucheron references Naka in his poem Sous le signe d'Hiroshima (Under the Star of Hiroshima), likening her to a "flake of snow". (Note: To clarify, the Gaucheron poem in question is not included in Genbaku-shi hyaku-hachijūnin-shū, which was later published in English as Against nuclear weapons: a collection of poems by 181 poets 1945–2007, Coal Sack Publishing.) (Note: The Gaucheron poem in Japanese translation by the late Hakko Oshima is "Hiroshima no hoshi no moto ni ヒロシマの星のもとに", available via oshimahakko.work. Originally published in print in Oshima tr. (2003) Fushinban, Koyo Media, which was translated from Gaucheron, État de veille (and other works).) The long poem was first published in the literary journal Europe: Revue Littéraire Mensuelle in 1970.

In 1988, a docudrama that dealt with the formation of the Sakura-tai and the fate of its members was released. The film, Sakura-tai Chiru was directed by Kaneto Shindō. Midori Naka was portrayed by actress Yasuko Yagami.
