= Lynching of Thomas Williams =

1927 lynching of a Black man in Tennessee

- Location: 35°07′03″N 89°58′16″W; Memphis, Tennessee, USA
- Date: September 28, 1927
- Target: Thomas Williams
- Attack type: Lynching
- Weapons: Noose, gun(s)

Thomas Williams was an African-American man who was lynched by a mob in Memphis, Tennessee, on September 28, 1927.

John R. Steelman, who wrote his PhD dissertation on "mob action in the South", listed Williams as one of the cases, wrote: "'The bullet-riddled body of Thomas Williams, alleged to have attacked a fifty-year old white woman, was found in Pleasant Union Churchyard, two miles from the scene of the crime' - near Memphis."
