= Keiko Sonoi =

Japanese actress (1913 - 1945)

- 園井恵子
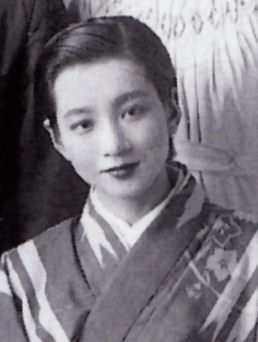
- Sonoi in her Takarazuka days
- Pronunciation: Sono'i Kei'ko
- Born: Tomi Hakamada (袴田トミ); August 6, 1913; Matsuo, Iwate (now Hachimantai)
- Died: 21 August 1945 (aged 32); Kobe, Hyogo
- Other name: Kiyono Kasanui (笠縫清乃)
- Education: Takarazuka Revue
- Occupation: actress
- Years active: 1930–1945
- Known for: film, theatre
- Notable credit: Muhōmatsu no isshō (1943, Daiei Film)
- Height: 155 cm (5.09 ft)

Keiko Sonoi (園井 恵子, Sonoi Keiko; 6 August 1913 – 21 August 1945) was a Japanese actress, who was a member of the all-female musical-performing Takarazuka Revue during the 1930s and the 1940s, best known for her role as an officer's widow in the wartime film Muhōmatsu no isshō (1943), and for being part of the Sakura-tai or Cherry Blossom Unit of traveling shingeki play actors who died as a result of the 1945 Hiroshima bombing.

The fate of the Cherry Blossom Unit was later dramatized by playwright Hisashi Inoue, and also made into a feature film by director Kaneto Shindo.

The actress appears to have had a long-held desire to perform shingeki plays, but that was not economically viable due to the need to her support her parents and siblings. As a Takarazienne, she had the manga comic artist Osamu Tezuka as a childhood fan who lived on her block, and Astro Boy may have been influenced by Sonoi's performance of Pinochio ("Pinocchio") from April to May, 1942.

== Biography ==
=== Early life ===
Keiko Sonoi was born Tomi Hakamada (袴田トミ, Hakamada Tomi) on 6 August 1913 in Matsuo, a village in Iwate Prefecture. She was the first-born daughter of Seikichi Hakamada (袴田清吉) and his wife Kame (カメ), who both ran a business that made and sold sweets.

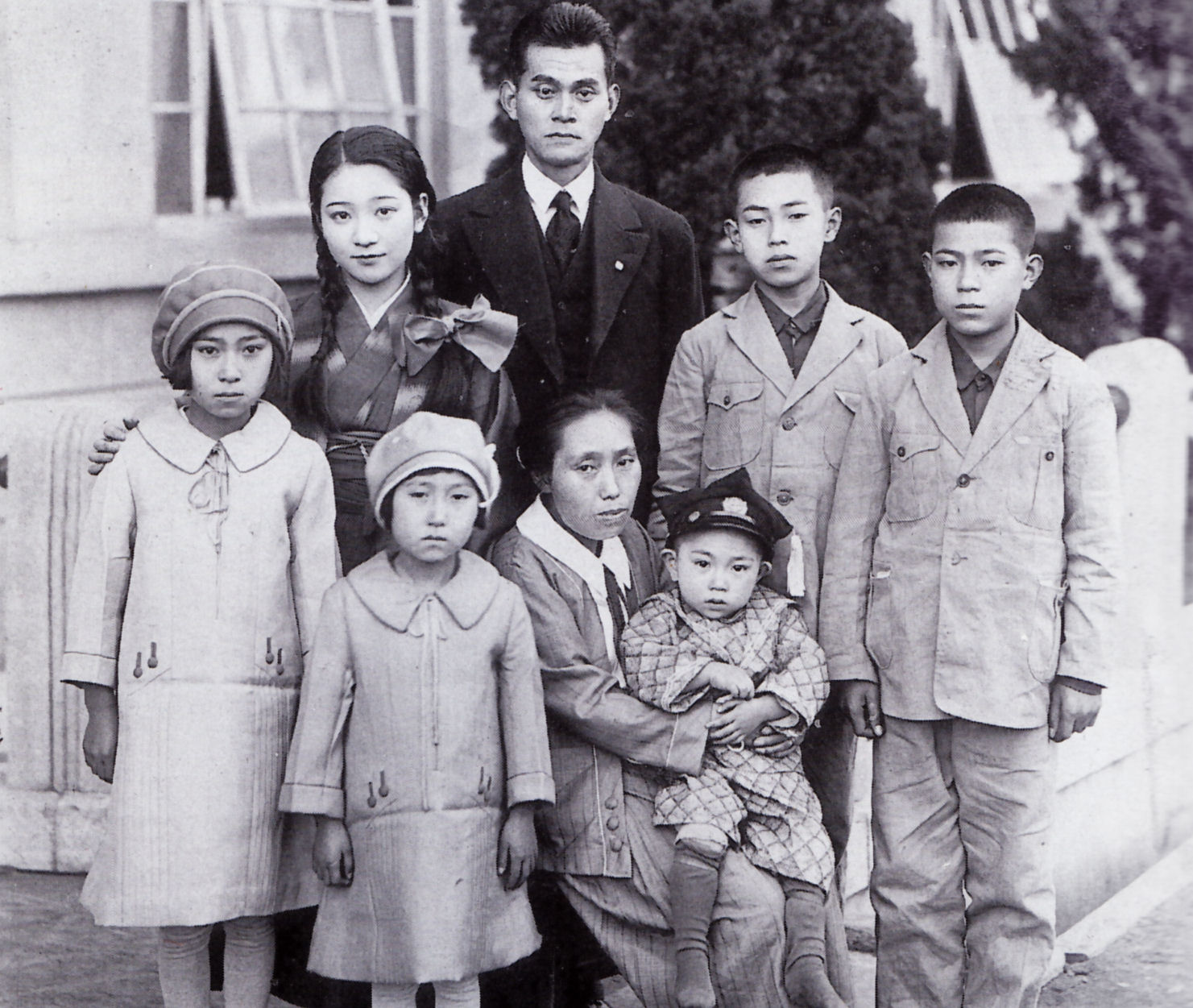
Keiko Sonoi with her uncle Tasuke's family in 1931.

She moved to Morioka to stay with her uncle Tasuke (多助)'s family, (Note: The uncle was also a purveyor of sweets.) in order to attend the "upper elementary school" there. (Note: Namely, the "Upper Course" (kōtō-ka) at the Iwate Women's Normal School's Attached Elementary School. In pre-war Japan, there was a six-year "Lower Course" followed by a two-year "Upper Course". So this was effectively middle school.)

Later, she and her uncle moved to Otaru, where she attended Otaru Higher Girls' School.

Her real name was "Tomi", as officially registered in her koseki (family register). But during childhood, this name provoked the taunting of other children, who chanted the line iyasa, Otomi (いやさ、お富) from the kabuki play Yowa Nasake Ukina no Yokogushi. She therefore decided to re-christen herself Hideko (英子), by which she was exclusively known as during her time in the Takarazuka Revue. She later called herself Masayo (真代), and her last letter, written four days before her death, was signed with that name. She allegedly chose these aliases from being immersed in onomancy (seimei handan), a type of fortune-telling based on the name.

=== Takarazuka aspirations ===
She learned of the existence of the all-girl Takarazuka Revue through girl's magazines, and by the time she graduated (upper) elementary school, she wished to join this musical revue theatrical company, but this was foiled when her mother opposed the decision.

During the time she attended the Otaru high school, she had opportunity to see a musical revue/musical play (歌劇, kageki) for the first time in her life. (Note: The show was put on by a company called Shimai-za (姉妹座), billed as a Takarazuka girl's revue, as best as she could recall.) Her determination to join Takarazuka remained steadfast, and after dropping out of high school, she entered the Takarazuka School of Music and Musical Theatre (Takarazuka Ongaku Kageki Gakkō) in March 1929.

A rather different perspective is taken by other sources, according to which Sonoi as a high schooler went to see a proletarian shingeki play put on by the Tsukiji Shōgekijō (Tsukiji Little Theater) performing on road in Otaru, and thenceforth, her true aspiration was to perform as shingeki actor. (Note: The play she saw was probably Kaisen ("Sea Battle"). This piece as well as the theater group was being treated as taboo even by recent theatrical circles, as according to Miwa Yanagi. Also, the organizer who invited the theatrical company to Otaru was the proletarian novelist Takiji Kobayashi, well-known for being tortured to death by the tokko police in an interrogation as a communist party member and supporter.) However, that would be a road to economic hardship, and instead she entered the Takarazuka School, which paid even first-year students (yoka-sei) a 10 yen (or 15 yen) monthly salary, most of which she would send to her family. (Note: Inoue & Komori 2003, Zadankai Showa bungakushi p. 174; reprinted from a piece in Subaru 20 (4), 1998.) (Note: Sonoi's father Seikichi Hakamada had co-signed a loan taken by a kindling and coal company, and when that company failed, Seikichi had to declare himself bankrupt in 1930. The family all moved to Takarazuka, Hyogo to depend on her. Sonoi then had to sustain her family in the place of her ailing father. Juzo Kobayashi, the Hankyu-Takarazuka group's founder and president, learned of her ordeal and once gave her an encouraging letter enclosed with 100 yen.)

One of the principal actors at the Tsukiji Little Theater was Sadao Maruyama, and Keiko Sonoi later did indeed retire from Takarazuka to become a shingeki actor under Maruyama's direction.

As a student she earned the nickname Hakama from her real name Hakamada, and was particularly close to her roommate Hisako Sakura.

=== Takarazuka Revue ===
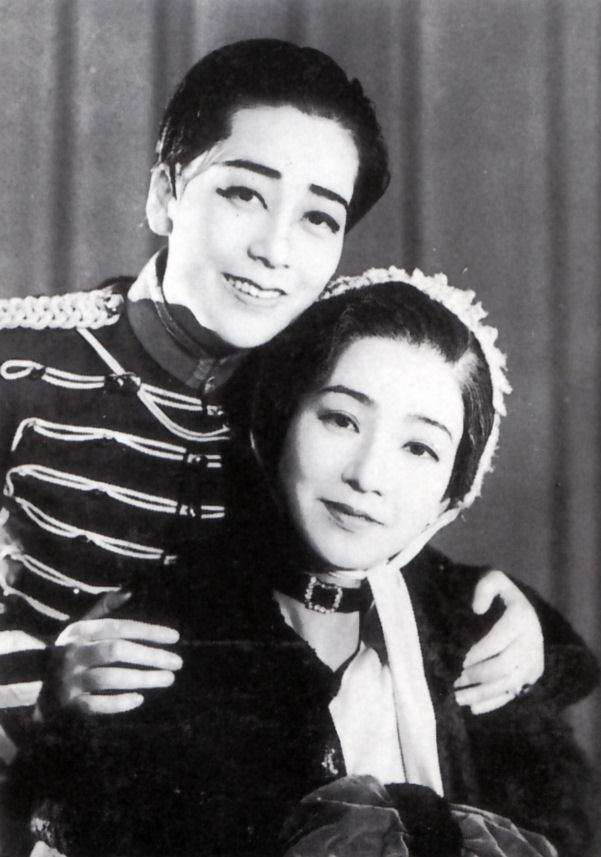
Sonoi (seated), as the mother of Frédéri (Kuniko Ashihara). L'Arlésienne (1934).

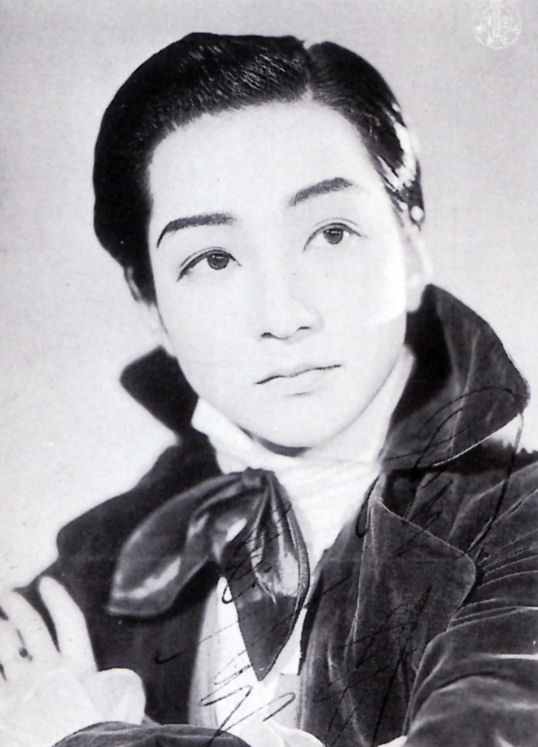
In a male role, as Simon in Aikoku daigakusei ("Patriotic College Student", 1939)

In 1930, she became second-year student (yoka-sei) and was now a performing member of the 19th class. She was assigned to the Hana-gumi (花組, "Flower Troupe") group, and initially performed under the stage name of Kiyono Kasanui making the stage debut in Haru no odori in April. She changed her stage name later that year to Keiko Sonoko.

After graduating in 1931, she was assigned to the Tsuki-gumi (Moon) then moved to other troops. In October, she was cast as the old gate-keeper lady in Tetsuzo Shirai's Lilac Time, and was praised as "the greatest (fruit of my endeavor) this year" by Ichizō Kobayashi, the head of the Hankyu-Toho conglomerate.

==== Typecasting ====
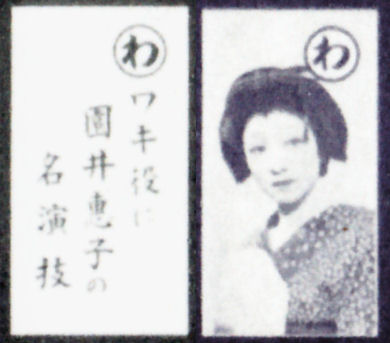
Sonoi is touted for her fine supporting role acting (waki-yaku) in this karuta card mock-up. Takarazuka Graph, December 1937.

She became recognized as a skilled and versatile supporting actress, especially in comedic roles. Her close colleagues Hisako Sakura and Kuniko Ashihara recalled that she excelled in her role as Frédéri's mother in Aruru no onna (1934), which was the Takarazuka adaptation of L'Arlésienne. (Note: Shiryōshū (1991), pp. 204–205, 214, 222–224. Including Ashihara interview.) Other comments include: "Not flashy but giving a 'flavorful' performance"(Yoshio Sakurauchi, politician well known as zuka-fans), "Skillfully executes cheery, witty roles" (Ken Harada, another politician), "Skillfully executes cheery, witty roles" (Issei Hisamatsu, Takarazuka stage director and writer).

Because she was considered too small of stature for male roles, but largish for female roles, she became type-cast for the sanmaime (a short-of- handsome, comic male) or elderly role. Even though one Takarazuka director, Chōken Maruo asserted that the Revue had precious few sanmaime talents, and "only the truly skilled can execute sanmaime parts", Sonoi herself despised being called sanmaime.

==== Takarazuka Films ====
In 1938, Takarazuka Films was established, and she was cast in several of its movies, until the production company was forced to shut down in 1941 as the war-times situation turned more serious. She appeared in Gunkoku jogakusei ("Female Students of a Military Nation", 1938), Yama to shōjo ("A Mountain and a Girl", 1939), Yukiwarisō ("Primrose" 1939), Minami jūjisei ("Southern Cross", 1941).

==== Playing outside repertoires ====
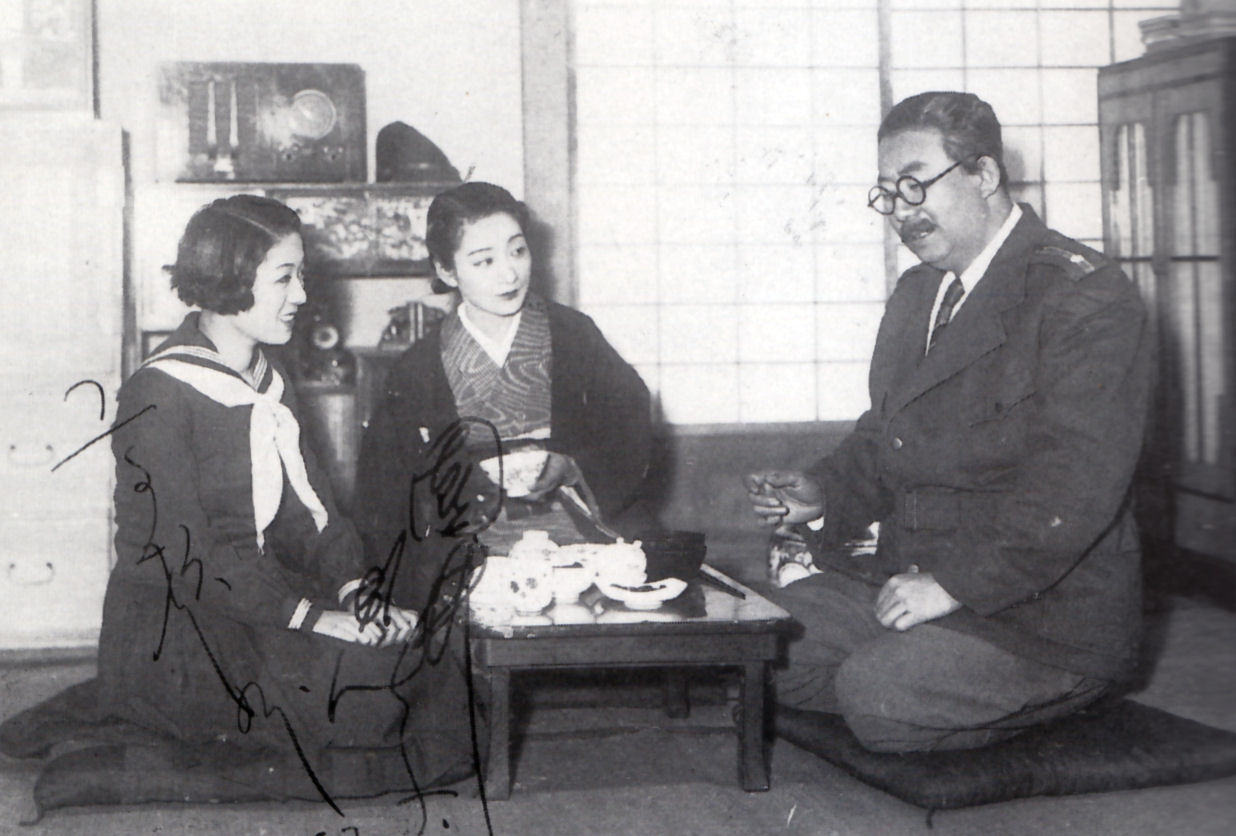
Stage scene from Wagaya no kōfuku (1942). Left to right: Taeko Takasugi, Sonoi, Roppa Furukawa.

In January 1941, Sonoi and Toho Studio movie star Hideko Takamine made guest appearances in theatrical productions by comedian Roppa Furukawa's company in Tokyo. (Note: At the Yūraku-za theater, operated by the Tokyo Takarazuka Theater Co., Ltd., (which later became Toho). The main Takarazuka Revue company is based in Takarazuka, Hyogo near Osaka/Kobe.) This received notice as the first time a current Takarazuka member was seconded to appear on stage elsewhere. According to some sources, Sonoi was specially picked out by playwright Kazuo Kikuta who wrote for Roppa's troupe; Kikuta had already regarded Sonoi as a promising talent and insisted she be cast in his Sekijūji-ki wa sususmu at Takarazuka in 1940.

==== Leaving Takarazuka ====
Around this time, Sonoi had already indicated her inclination to convert to Shingeki acting. Correspondence from Jūzaburō Yoshioka at the Tokyo Takarazuka office (Note: Yoshiwaka was later to become president of Tokyo Takarazuka; he was also an officer of the parent company.) shows that management was aware she "wanted to do plays like the Tsukiji" (Tsukiji Little Theater, i.e., shingeki plays), but Yoshioka suggested she settle for performing with Roppa for the time being.

In the end, she would not be persuaded to remain, and after starring as the original cast lead in Pinochio (ピノチオ; "Pinnochio", April– May, 1942), Sonoi resigned from Takarazuka Revue. Shigenori Utsumi who wrote the script later recalled being stunned by this choice of casting, but Yachiyo Kasugano, long-lived doyenne of Takarazuka, revealed that she had been tapped for the part, but lobbied to cede the role to Sonoi after learning of her imminent departure.

The Takarazuka Revue tried to retain her by offering her terms that would allow her some leeway to perform in film or shingeki theater, but the compensation and performing restrictions they offered were unsatisfactory, according to her correspondence to Shizu Nakai. (Note: Shizu Nakai was a graduate of an older class at Sonoi's high school, Otaru Higher Girls' School, who lived in the Kobe area, and became the president of the high school alma mater organization, which was effectively a support group for Sonoi at Takarazuka. Nakai remained close to Sonoi, and she figures later in the Hirsohima episode (see below).)

=== Film role in Matsu ===
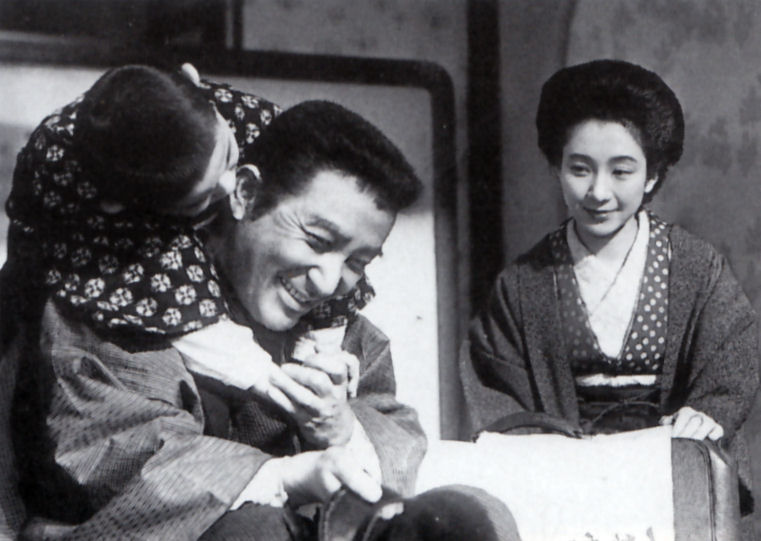
Sonoi in a still shot from Muhōmatsu no isshō (1943). With Tsumasaburo Bando as Matsu. The child was played by Hiroyuki Nagato.

In 1943, Sonoi was cast opposite top leading actor Tsumasaburō Bandō in Muhōmatsu no isshō, where she played Mrs. Yoshioka, whom Muhōmatsu (or Matsu the Untamed, played by Bandō) becomes romantically but unrequitedly attached to. (Note: A later version (1958) was filmed starring Toshiro Mifune and aforementioned Hideko Takamine.) The film became a box office hit.

The child actor billed as Akio Sawamura (actor Hiroyuki Nagato of later years) said he earnestly wished he could marry a woman like Sonoi.

The director, Hiroshi Inagaki recalled that Takako Irie and Fukuko Sayo had been the first choices for the role but were not available, and the offer was made to Sonoi on Sayo's recommendation.

Due to success of this film, Daiei offered Sonoi a studio contract, but she declined saying she preferred to continue studying with her theatrical company, Kuraku-za (cf. below). The director, Hiroshi Inagaki was eager to sign Sonoi onto his new projects at the time; in later years, the director reflected that Sonoi was "not so much a skilled performer as someone with a passion for performing. She had the basics of inhabiting the persona of her role, down pat".

=== Non-musical theater ===
The theatrical troupe Kuraku-za (苦楽座; "Pleasure and Pain Company") was formed afterwards, on July 8, 1942 (2 months prior to Sonoi leaving Takarazuka) by Sadao Maruyama and others, namely Tokuemon Takayama (Kenji Susukida), Keita Fujiwara (Kamatari Fujiwara), and Musei Tokugawa. Of the initial run of three plays, Sonoi was cast in Genkanburo ("entryway bath"). She continued performing for the troupe, appearing in Yume no su ("Dream's nest", 2nd run, June 1943 at the Hōgakuza), Eien no otto ("Eternal husband". 3rd run, January 1944 at the Kokumin Shingekijo (Note: This was Tsukiji Little Theater, forced to change its name to Kokumin Shingekijō (People's Shingeki Theatre) due to wartime regulation.)).

Sonoi played the widow's role as in the movie when the troupe produced the theater adaptation of Muhōmatsu no isshō, first in Kuraku-za's 4th run at Hōgakuza in October 1944, after which the troupe took this play on the road, traveling through a large part of Western Japan.

After the regional tour finished in December, the bombing raids intensified in Tokyo and food procurement became difficult. The Kuraku-za decided to disband, but Maruyama suggested the members regroup as a traveling troupe with the objective of comfort-visiting (慰問, imon) the populace beleaguered by war, and twelve other actors joined. They came up with the name "Sakura-tai" for the new troupe while they were at the Tsunagi Hot Spring in Sonoi's hometown of Morioka, Iwate, rehearsing for Shishi ("Lion", written by Jūrō Miyoshi). But this name was not made official until June 1945 after they became stationed at Hiroshima.

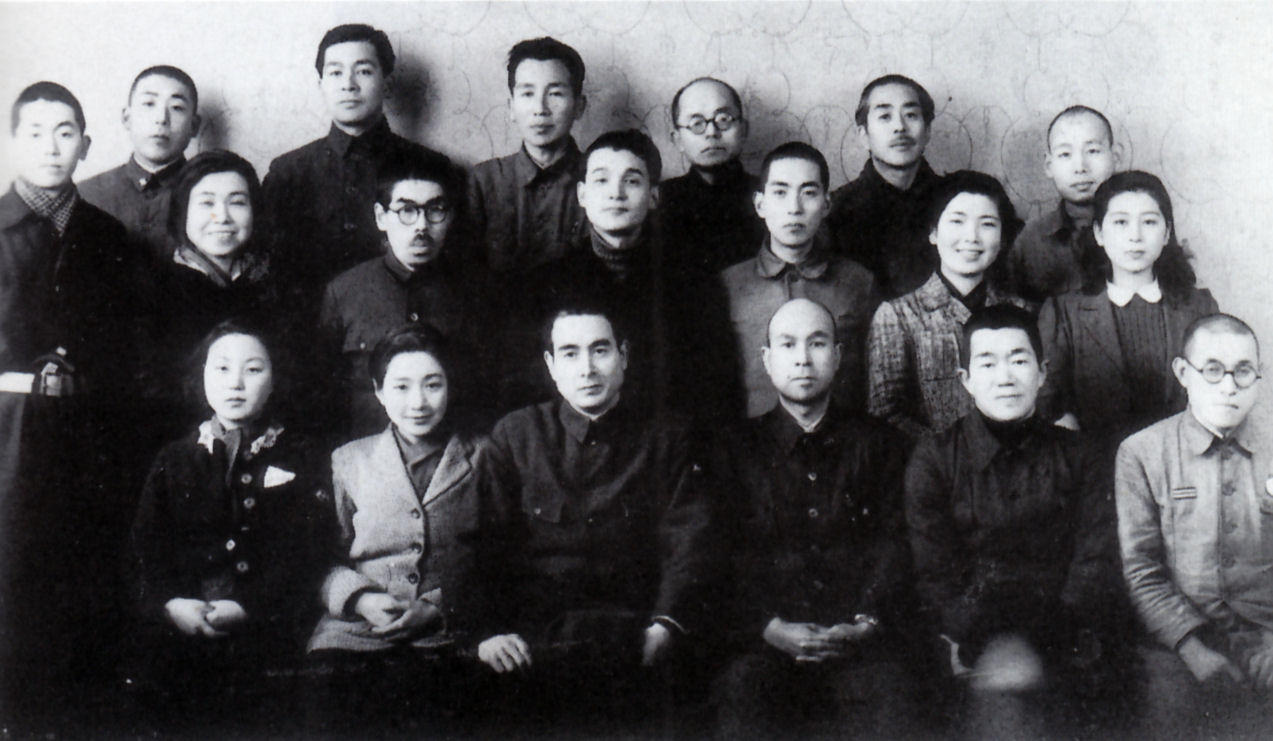
Sakura-tai unit (Formally still Kuraku-za's mobile unit). At Fuji Film's Ashikaga Plant where they performed January 1945. Front row, left to right: Tsuyako Shimaki, Keiko Sonoi, Yasushi Nagata, X, Sadao Maruyama, X. Middle row: Midori Naka, Motoo Hatta (stage director), Jun Tatara, Seiki Iketa、Harue Tone, Junko[?] Emori. Left row: Shozo Takayama, X, Ichiro Tetsu (acting coach), Yoshio Endo (lighting), Miezō Mizutani (prop manager), Kohei Hijikata (stage effects), X. (Note: "X" stands for personnel connected with Fuji's manufacturing plant. Shimaki, Sonoi, Maruyama, Naka, Shozo Takayama became hibakusha in Hiroshima.)

The mobile troupe was only able to do a grand tour briefly, from January to March 1945, travelling to parts of the Kanto area and then Hiroshima. In Kanto they mainly visited manufacturing plant workers, but in Hiroshima they "comfort-visited" wounded soldiers as well. The Nihon Ido Engeki Renmei (Japan Touring Theatre League) then instructed all troupes to cease touring city by city, and perform in the confines of an evacuation (sokai) area. It was decided Kuraku-za would be assigned to stay in Hiroshima or its vicinity.

=== Hiroshima ===
The choice of Hiroshima as their evacuation zone was a source of consternation for members, because the city remained relatively unscathed despite its military strategic importance, and a major strike was thought imminent. Sonoi wrote in April stating that she tried to refuse going to Hiroshima and remain in Tokyo (which had been incinerated in the March bombing), but was pressured to change her mind. (Note: April 1945 Correspondence from Sonoi to Shizu Nakai) Also while she was still at Tokyo, she went to the Toho Studio office asking if there were any film roles for her, which she wanted to take to extricate herself from touring under heavy bombardment. In fact director Kajirō Yamamoto was hoping to cast her in his new film (Kaidanji) but the office replied no, and she had left.

The Kuraku-za's mobile unit, now officially renamed Sakura-tai (櫻隊; "Cherry Blossom Unit") reached Hiroshima on June 22. From July 5, they toured the San'in region. Due to illness, (Note: Maruyama coming down with pleuritis.) the troupe returned to Hiroshima prematurely ahead of schedule. (Note: And leaving the task of comfort-visit to Sango-za (Coral Troupe) made up of Shinpa actors and Yoshimoto Kogyo performers.) This marked the end of performance by the Sakura-tai.

Members either dropped out of Sakura-tai or left Hiroshima, so that in August only 9 members remained at their office in Hiroshima. Sonoi spent time recuperating in Kobe (at the home of Shizu Nakai and husband Yoshio) August 2 to August 5, returning to Hiroshima on the fateful day.

Thus Sonoi, Maruyama and others were in Hiroshima when the atomic bomb was dropped on August 6, 1945. They both succumbed to the aftereffects shortly thereafter.

=== Hiroshima A-bomb ===
When the atomic bomb was dropped on Hiroshima, Sonoi was thrown from the hallway to the yard by the blast, and momentarily lost consciousness, but otherwise had no visible wounds. She found actor Shōzō Takayama (son of Kuraku-za co-founder Tokuemon Takayama aka Kenji Susukida) lightly injured, and the two of them fled to Mount Hiji approximately 1 kilometre (0.6 mi) away. Sadao Maruyama and Midori Naka also left the scene, each separately, but were in poor condition were taken into custody at different locations. (Note: Maruyama headed for Mt. Hiji but collapsed and was taken by truck to a temporary facility for the wounded. Naka was found in the water of the Kyobashi River where her strength failed her, and was transported to a Tokyo hospital.) The remains of the five others members were found skeletonized at the burning wreck of the office.

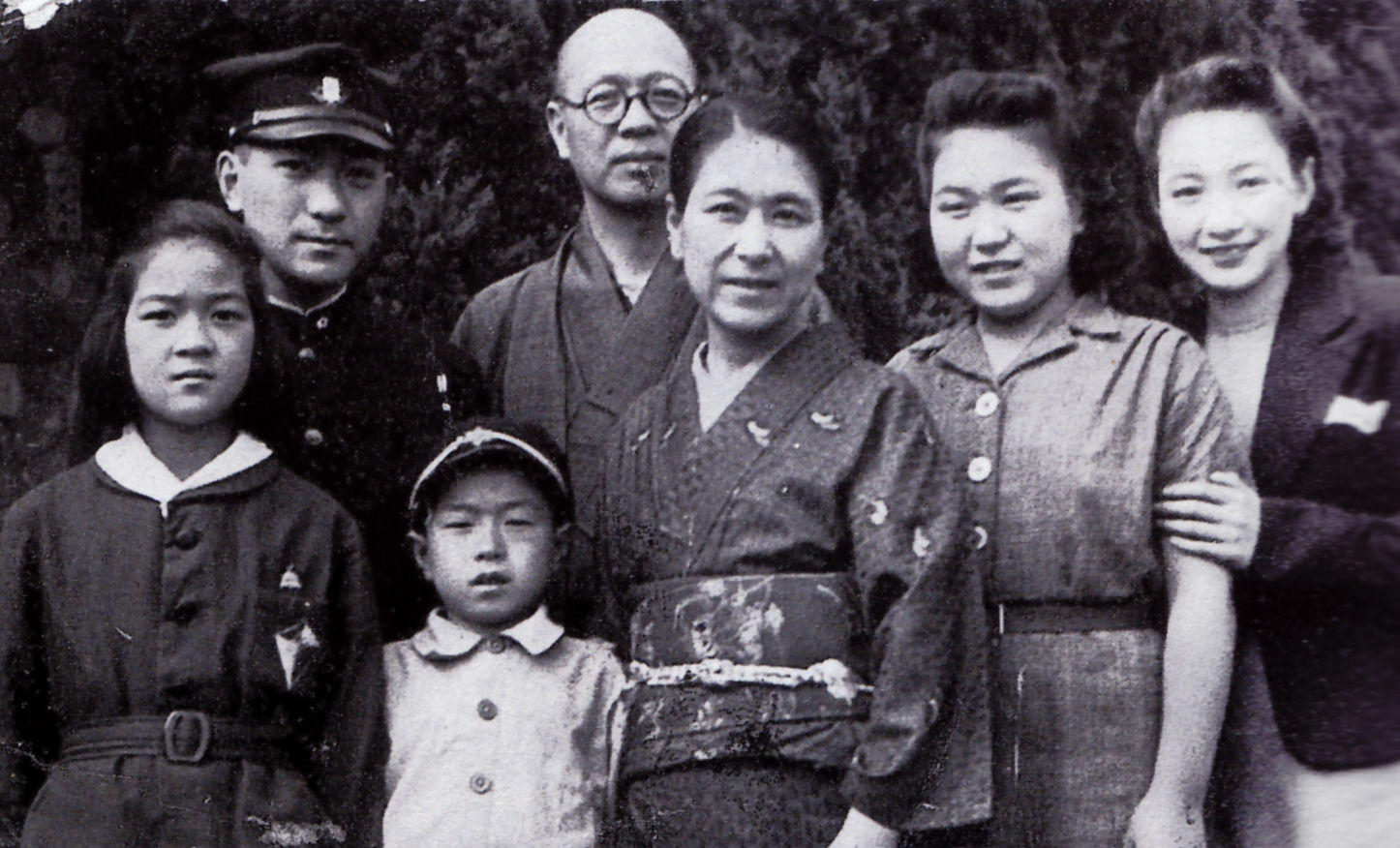
1943, with the Nakai family. From right, Sonoi, Michiko Nakai, Shizu, and Yoshio

Sonoi and Takayama subsequently took the train and reached the Nakai residence in Kobe. (Note: Shizu Nakai whom Sonoi called "(my) mother at Mt. Rokko" lived in Kobe. As noted above, Shizu Nakai was from the same high school as Sonoi and a long-time supporter.) Sonoi's face and clothing were soiled, and she wore a jika-tabi on one foot and a man's shoe on the other, so that she looked "like a beggar" and was nearly beyond recognition.

On August 15, when informed the war had ended, Sonoi expressed her gladness at being able to act to her hearts content to Akiko Utsumi who was visiting, (Note: Akiko Utsumi (stage name Machiko Kako) was Sonoi's junior at the Takarazuka Revue; She was by then married to Shigenori Utsumi a writer/director for the Takarazuka Revue.) and also wrote a letter dated August 17 to her mother Kame in Morioka expressing this sentiment.

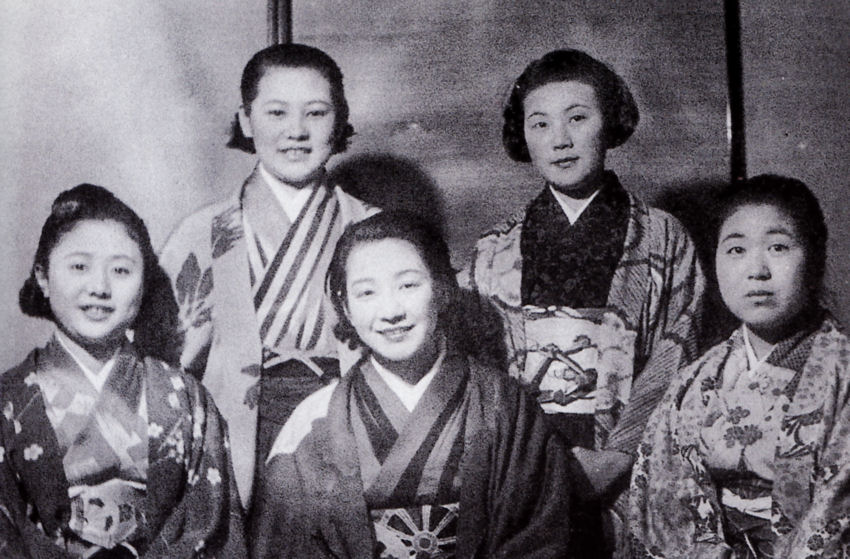
Takarazuka Revue days. From left, Nobuko Otowa, Aiko Kagayaki, Sonoi, Machiko Kako, and Mrs. Nakai's daughter Michiko Nakai.

However, Sonoi's condition deteriorated. Her hair started to fall off at night, before suffering high fever around August 19, according to Mrs. Nakai; Other symptoms such as hematochezia, internal bleeding and delusions also presented.

By August 19, Motoo Hatta who was a stage director for Sakura-tai tracked Sonoi down, and came to see her at the Nakai residence. (Note: Hatta was asked by Sango-za to take along two of its actresses. One of them was Chieko Morokoa, interviewed by the Mainichi Shimbun in the March 2012 article.) Sonoi asked of news about Maruyama, and sensed he must have died. On August 21, Sonoi's fever reached 40 degrees C, and Mrs. Utsumi rushed out to procure ice. Sonoi felt the coolness of the chilled gauze, and said "Oh, how good it feels". Those were the last words she uttered before she died.

Sonoi's remains were cremated the following day, and her bones and ashes buried in Onryū-ji in Morioka.

The story of the Sakura-tai's demise was written up in a book by author Hagie Ezu in 1980, which was adapted into the film Sakura-tai chiru (1988) directed by Kaneto Shindō. (Note: The title of Ezu's book (Ezu 1980) has been variously rendered "Dissolution of Sakura-unit: A theater group's suffering from the atomic bombings" or "Total Annihilation of the Sakura Party, Martyrdom of a Drama Company".)

== Legacy ==
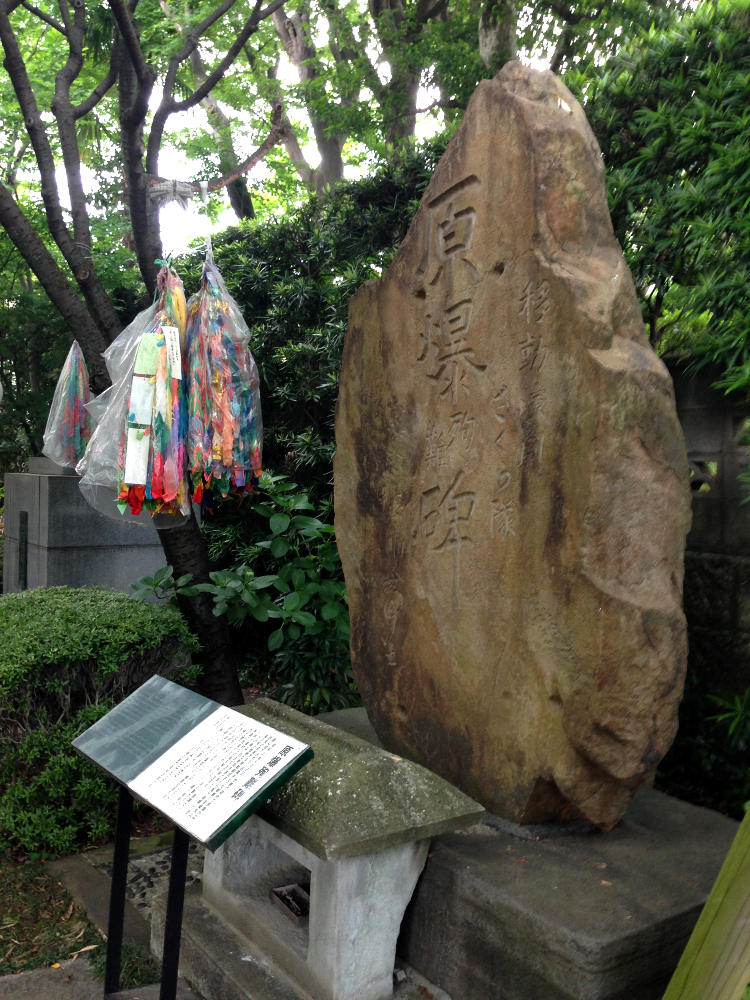
Sakura-tai monument in Goyakurakan-ji, Meguro, Tokyo.

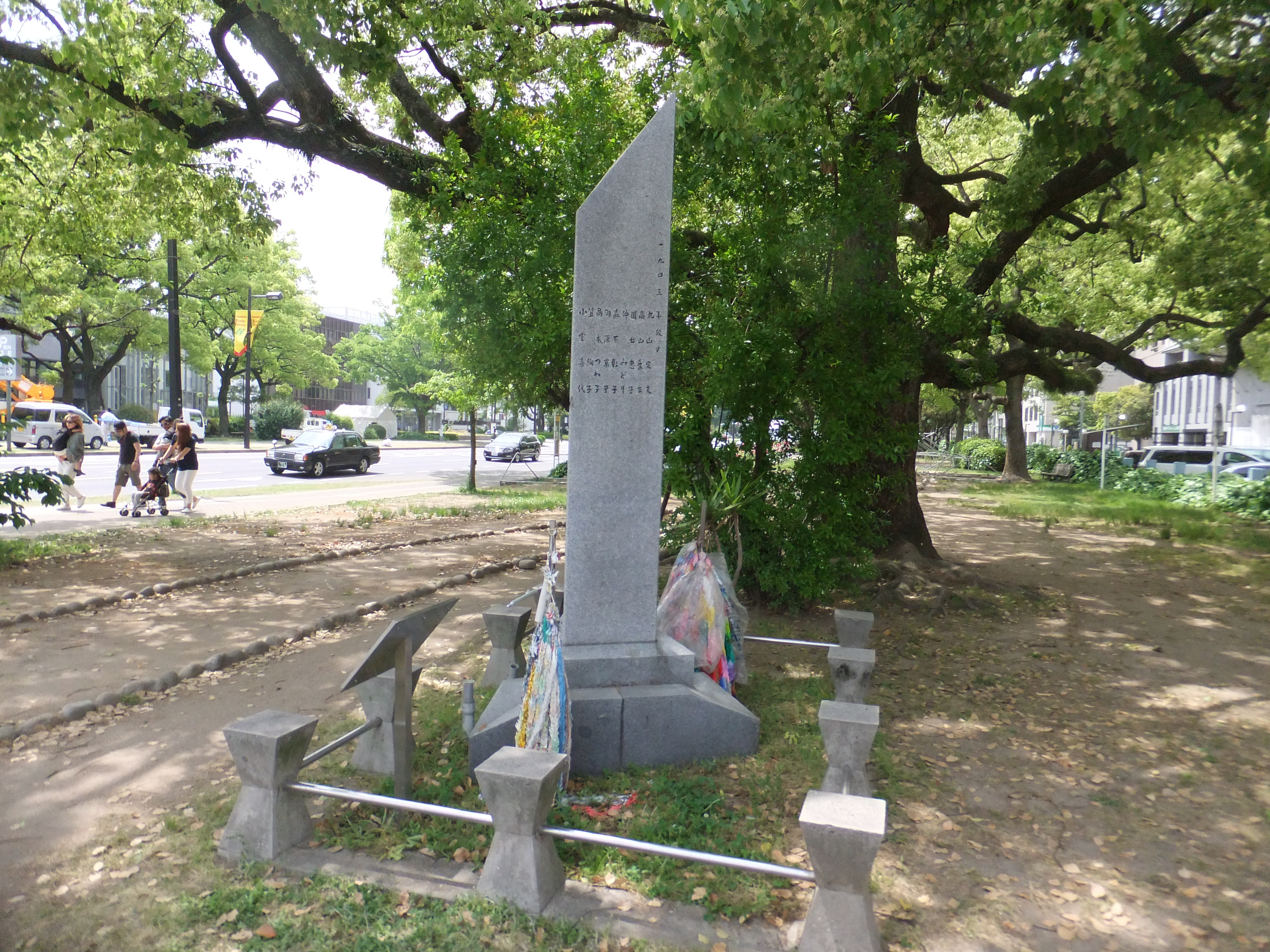
Sakura-tai monument in Hiroshima

Influence on Tezuka's art

The childhood home of manga artist Osamu Tezuka in Takarazuka, Hyogo belonged to a row of houses dubbed "Musical Theater Tenements" (Kageki nagaya), and Tezuka recalls that Keiko Sonoi lived at the end of this block. (Note: Or "off of the block". The phrase hazure is ambiguous.) The manga Ribbon no kishi (Princess Knight) was "totally nostalgia of the Takarazuka Revue", in the comic book artist's own words. He was also a devoted fan of the Takarazuka production of Pinochio (ピノチオ; "Pinocchio", which starred Sonoi), and his Astro Boy may have been influenced by it.

Matsuo village

In 1989 her birthplace Matsuo, Iwate commemorated the centennial of the founding of the village by holding an exhibit of Sonoi's belongings and related printed paraphernalia, publishing a scrapbook compilation entitled Shiryōshū.

== Related works ==
- Hagie Ezu Sakura-tai zemetsu (1980), a non-fiction account of the demise of the troupe.
- Kaneto Shindo dir., Sakura-tai Chiru (1988 film), based on Ezu's non-fiction. Sonoi was portrayed by Takako Miki.
- Hisashi Inoue's play Kamiyacho Sakura Hotel (first run in 1997) Sakura Hotel. Sonoi played by Kazuyo Mita in the original cast.

== See also ==
- Midori Naka
