= National Security Resources Board =

The National Security Resources Board was a United States government agency created by the National Security Act of 1947 whose purpose was to advise the President, in times of war, on how to mobilize natural resources, manpower, and the scientific establishment to meet the demands of the Department of Defense.

== History ==
The board's ultimate goal was to conduct long-term, continuous planning to prepare the United States for adequate industrial and economic mobilization. The board was originally very ineffective, perhaps because authority was shared among all eight members rather than centralized in a single individual. In 1949, this was changed on the recommendation of the Hoover Commission. All power was vested solely in the chairman, and the board was moved to be part of the Department of Defense. It was later reassigned to the Executive Office of the President. Its role was eventually eliminated when its responsibilities were transferred to the Office of Defense Mobilization in June 1953.

== Mission ==
The organization had the following statutory duties:

- policies concerning industrial and civilian mobilization in order to assure the most effective mobilization and maximum utilization of the Nation's manpower in the event of war.
- programs for the effective use in time of war of the Nation's natural and industrial resources for military and civilian needs, for the maintenance and stabilization of the civilian economy in time of war, and for the adjustment of such economy to war needs and conditions;
- policies for unifying, in time of war, the activities of Federal agencies and departments engaged in or concerned with production, procurement, distribution, or transportation of military or civilian supplies, materials, and products;
- the relationship between potential supplies of, and potential requirements for, manpower, resources, and productive facilities in time of war;
- policies for establishing adequate reserves of strategic and critical material, and for the conservation of these reserves;
- the strategic relocation of industries, services, government, and economic activities, the continuous operation of which is essential to the Nation's security.

== Structure ==
The board was composed of eight members, one of whom served as its chairman.

In addition, at the time of its creation, the chairman of the National Security Resources Board also served ex officio as one of only seven permanent members of the National Security Council. The first chairman was businessman Arthur M. Hill.
