= Sakura-tai Chiru =

1988 Japanese film

- Theatrical release poster
- さくら隊散る
- Directed by: Kaneto Shindō
- Written by: Kaneto Shindō (screenplay); Hagie Ezu (story)
- Produced by: Kiyoshi Mizogami; Jiro Shindō
- Narrated by: Nobuko Otowa
- Cinematography: Yoshiyuki Miyake
- Edited by: Mitsuo Kondo
- Music by: Hikaru Hayashi
- Production companies: Kindai Eiga Kyōkai; Gohyaku Rakanji Temple
- Distributed by: Independent Film Center
- Release date: 30 April 1988 (Japan)
- Running time: 110 minutes
- Country: Japan
- Language: Japanese

Sakura-tai Chiru (Japanese: さくら隊散る; lit. "The Cherry Blossom Team Scattered") is a 1988 Japanese documentary film and docudrama written and directed by Kaneto Shindō. Based on a nonfictional story by Hagie Ezu, it depicts the fate of the Sakura ("cherry blossom") theatre troupe, several of whose members were killed in the atomic bombing of Hiroshima.

== Plot ==
In interviews with 30 associates and friends, and in reenactments of the events, director Shindō recounts the history of the Sakura theatre troupe, formed from remnants of left-leaning troupes that had been forced to disband by the militarist regime, and its end in Hiroshima. While five members died instantly, the survivors of the blast, including the troupe's leader Sadao Maruyama and actresses Keiko Sonoi and Midori Naka, died during the following weeks from their injuries. Only two members, who weren't present in Hiroshima at the time of the bombing, survived.

== Cast ==
=== Interviewees ===
- Koreya Senda
- Yasue Yamamoto
- Kappei Matsumoto
- Haruko Sugimura
- Seiji Ikeda
- Osamu Takizawa
- Jūkichi Uno
- Kokichi Makimura
- Taiji Tonoyama
- Hagie Ezu
- Eitarō Ozawa

=== Reenactment actors ===
- Masashi Furuta as Sadao Maruyama
- Takako Miki as Keiko Sonoi
- Yasuko Yagami as Midori Naka
- Satoshi Kawashima as Shozo Takayama
- Oikawa Izo as Kokichi Makimura

== Theme ==
Shindō, who was born in Hiroshima Prefecture, repeatedly attempted to memorialise the bombing of his birthplace and its aftermath in films like Children of Hiroshima (1952), Mother (1963), Sakura-tai Chiru and Teacher and Three Children (2008).

== Release ==
Sakura-tai Chiru was released in Japanese cinemas on 30 April 1988. It was later released as part of a DVD anthology box dedicated to director Shindō in 2002.

Also in 1988, Shindō published the story of the Sakura troupe in book form along with notes on the film's production.

== Reception ==
In Kinema Junpo magazine's list of the 10 best Japanese films of the year, Sakura-tai Chiru reached #7 in 1988.

Upon the film's home media release, film historian Donald Richie commented that Shindō created a picture that would have found the interest of Shindō's mentor Kenji Mizoguchi, looking at the disaster "with clear-eyed compassion".

Comparing Sakura-tai Chiru with Shindō's earlier Children of Hiroshima, Lauri Kitsnik saw a "much more realist style" in the bombing montage sequence. At the same time, Shindō's emphasising of artificiality and mixing of styles and art forms point at "the inevitability of staging in cinema and the impossibility of non-fiction".
