= National Production Authority =

American wartime production coordination agency in the Korean War

The National Production Authority (NPA) was an agency of the United States government which developed and promoted the production and supply of materials and facilities necessary for defense mobilization. It was part of the Department of Commerce.

The agency was created by Department Order 123, issued September 11, 1950, under authority of the Defense Production Act of 1950 and Executive Order 10161 (issued September 9, 1950). The organization's function was to ensure the needs of the civilian economy were adequately represented in defense mobilization efforts, and that small businesses were participating in defense contracts.

In 1951, after the escalation of the Korean War, the NPA was placed under the control of the Defense Production Administration in the Office of Defense Mobilization.

The NPA was abolished by Department Order 152, issued October 1, 1953. Its functions were dispersed among a number of successor agencies, including the Business and Defense Services Administration (1953–1970); the Bureau of Domestic Commerce (1970–1972); the Domestic and International Business Administration (1972–1977); the Industry and Trade Administration (1977–1980); and the International Trade Administration (1980–present).
