= Charles Edward Wilson (businessman) =

American CEO of General Electric

Charles Wilson
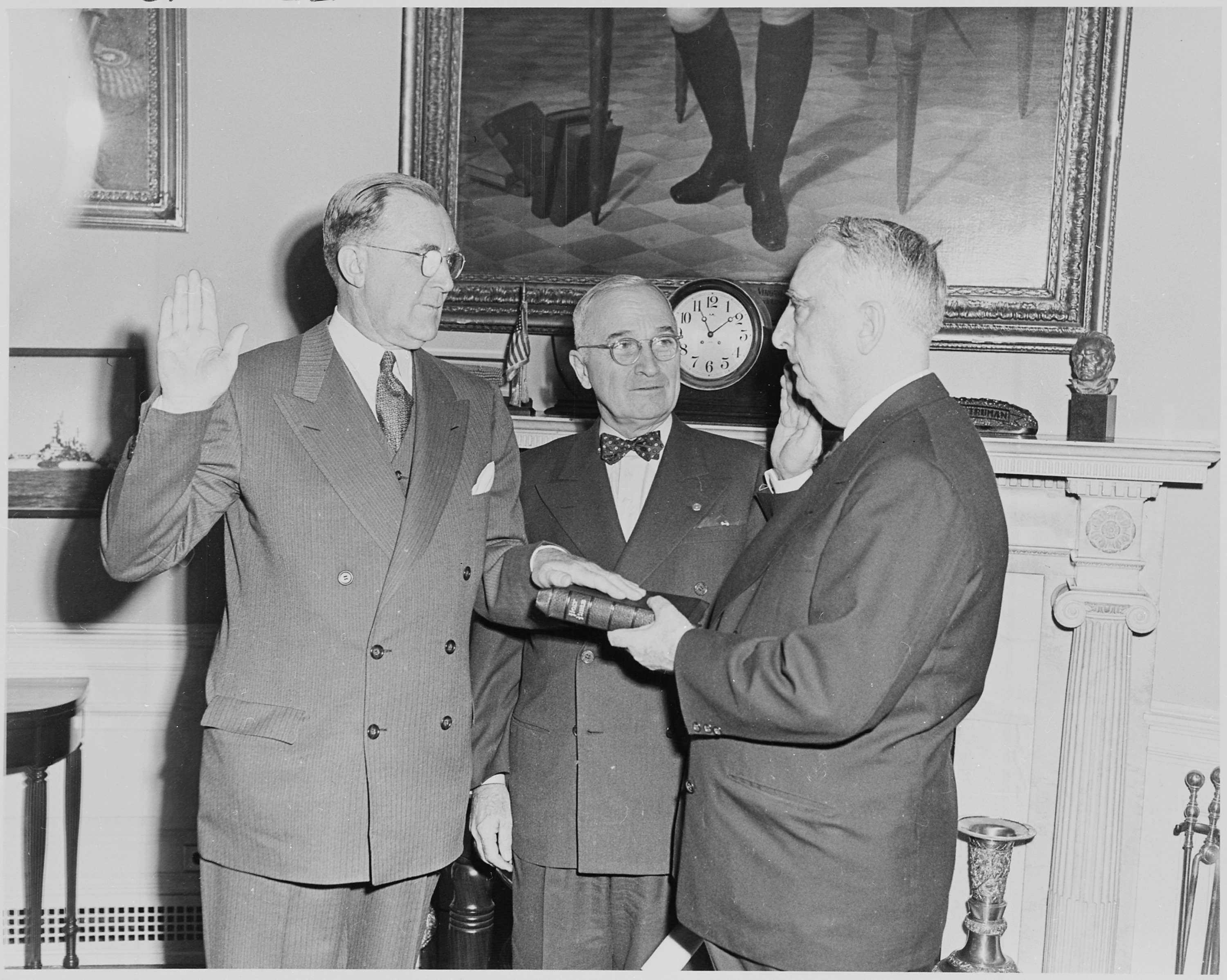
- Wilson (left) being sworn in

Director of the Office of Defense Mobilization
- In office December 16, 1950 – March 31, 1952
- President: Harry S. Truman
- Preceded by: Position established
- Succeeded by: John R. Steelman (Acting)

Chairman of the President's Committee on Civil Rights
- In office December 5, 1946 – December 1947
- President: Harry S. Truman
- Preceded by: Committee established
- Succeeded by: Committee disbanded

Personal details
- Born: Charles Edward Wilson; November 18, 1886 New York City, New York, U.S.
- Died: January 3, 1972 (aged 85) Bronxville, New York, U.S.
- Party: Democratic

Charles Edward Wilson (November 18, 1886 – January 3, 1972) was a CEO of General Electric. During World War II, he served as Executive Vice Chairman of the War Production Board. After leaving GE, he worked at Grace until his retirement in 1956.

== Early life ==
Wilson left school at the age of 12 to work as a stock boy at the Sprague Electrical Works, which was acquired by the General Electric Company. He took night classes to graduate from high school, and he worked his way up to the position of president of the corporation in 1939.

== Public service ==
During World War II, Wilson served on the War Production Board as its executive vice-chairman in September 1942, supervising the huge U.S. war production effort. He resigned in August 1944 after a bitter dispute over jurisdiction with the Department of War and the Department of the Navy. Wilson stated at the time that the US must keep its economy mobilized for war to avoid another Great Depression.

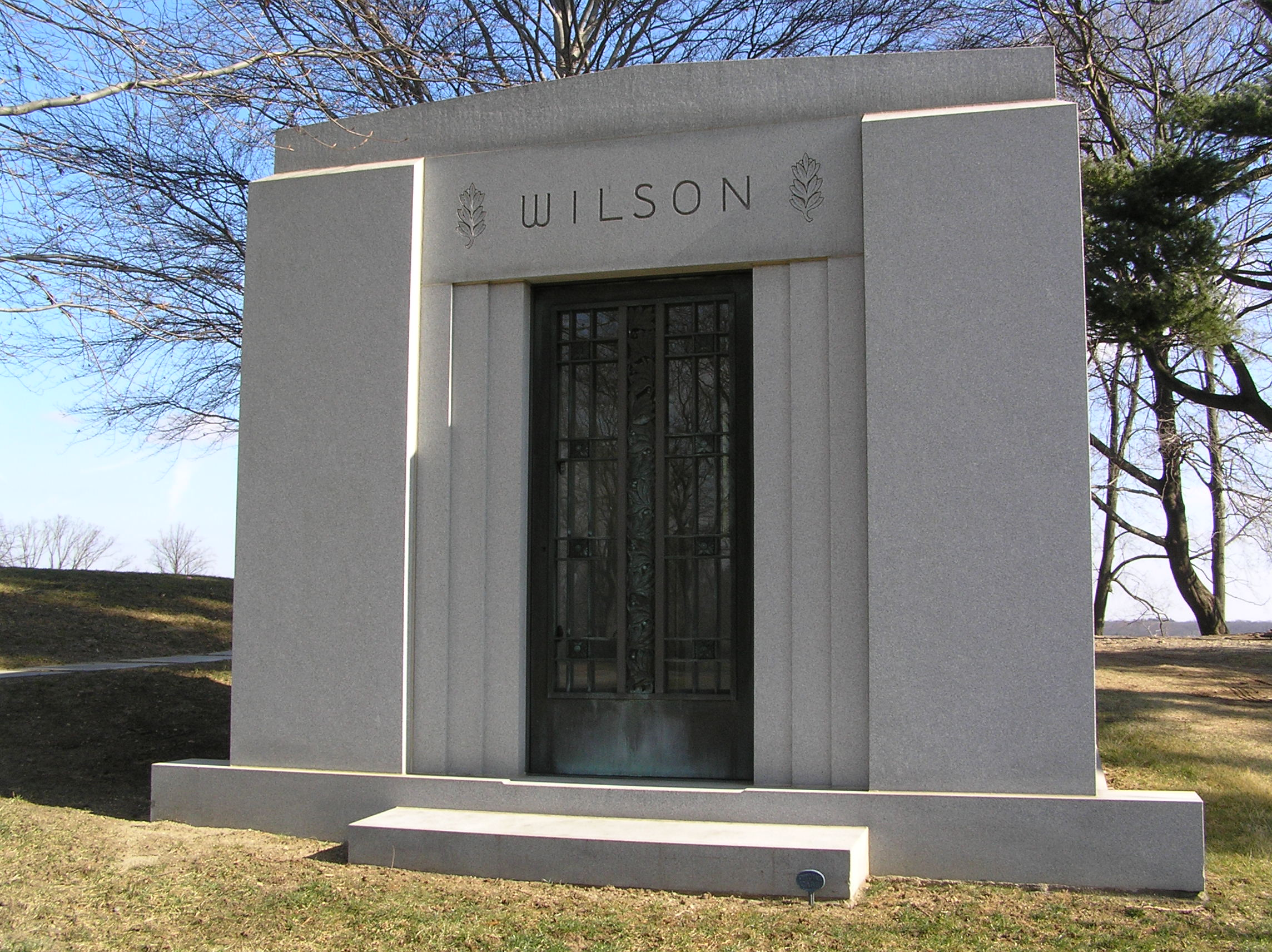
Mausoleum of Charles E. Wilson

== General Electric career ==
After returning to General Electric in 1945, Wilson began an anti-union campaign. He also served President Harry S. Truman as the chairman of the blue-ribbon President's Committee on Civil Rights in 1946–47. The committee recommended new civil rights legislation to protect "all parts of our population." In December 1950, Wilson left GE again to serve Truman as director of the new Office of Defense Mobilization, which imposed controls on the US economy during the Korean War, such as rationing raw materials for civilian production. This position became so powerful that the press began dubbing Wilson the "co-president." After a bitter dispute with his own Wage Stabilization Board, which had recommended wage increases for unionized steel workers without his knowledge, Wilson resigned from his post in March 1952. He had intervened in the dispute to support the steel industry's demand for price increases to offset the wage increases, only to see Truman back the WSB.

== Later life ==
Wilson returned to General Electric briefly, before becoming chairman of the board of W.R. Grace & Co. until his retirement in 1956. He then became the president of the People-to-People Foundation, a nonpartisan organization that promoted international friendship and understanding. John G. Forrest wrote in The New York Times, "Charles Wilson is a big man by any standard, physical, moral, or mental."

== Personal life ==
Wilson and his wife adopted their daughter, Margaret Wilson, from an orphanage when she was 18 years old. Margaret later married Hugh Pierce and they had one son, Charles Edward Wilson Pierce, named for his grandfather and father. Charles Wilson died in Westchester County, New York, in 1972, and his remains are interred in a private mausoleum in the Kensico Cemetery.

== Nickname ==
He was nicknamed "Electric Charlie" to avoid being confused with Charles Erwin Wilson, US Secretary of Defense under President Dwight Eisenhower and earlier the Chairman of the General Motors Corporation, who was nicknamed "Engine Charlie."

Business positions
| Preceded by Gerard Swope | President of the General Electric Company; 1940–1942 | Succeeded by Gerard Swope |
| Preceded by Gerard Swope | President of the General Electric Company; 1945–1950 | Succeeded by Ralph J. Cordiner |
Awards and achievements
| Preceded by Claire Lee Chennault | Cover of Time; 13 December 1943 | Succeeded by Greer Garson |
Political offices
| New office | Director of the Office of Defense Mobilization; 1950–1952 | Succeeded by John R. Steelman; Acting |
