= Thomas Farrell (United States Army officer) =

American general (1891–1967)

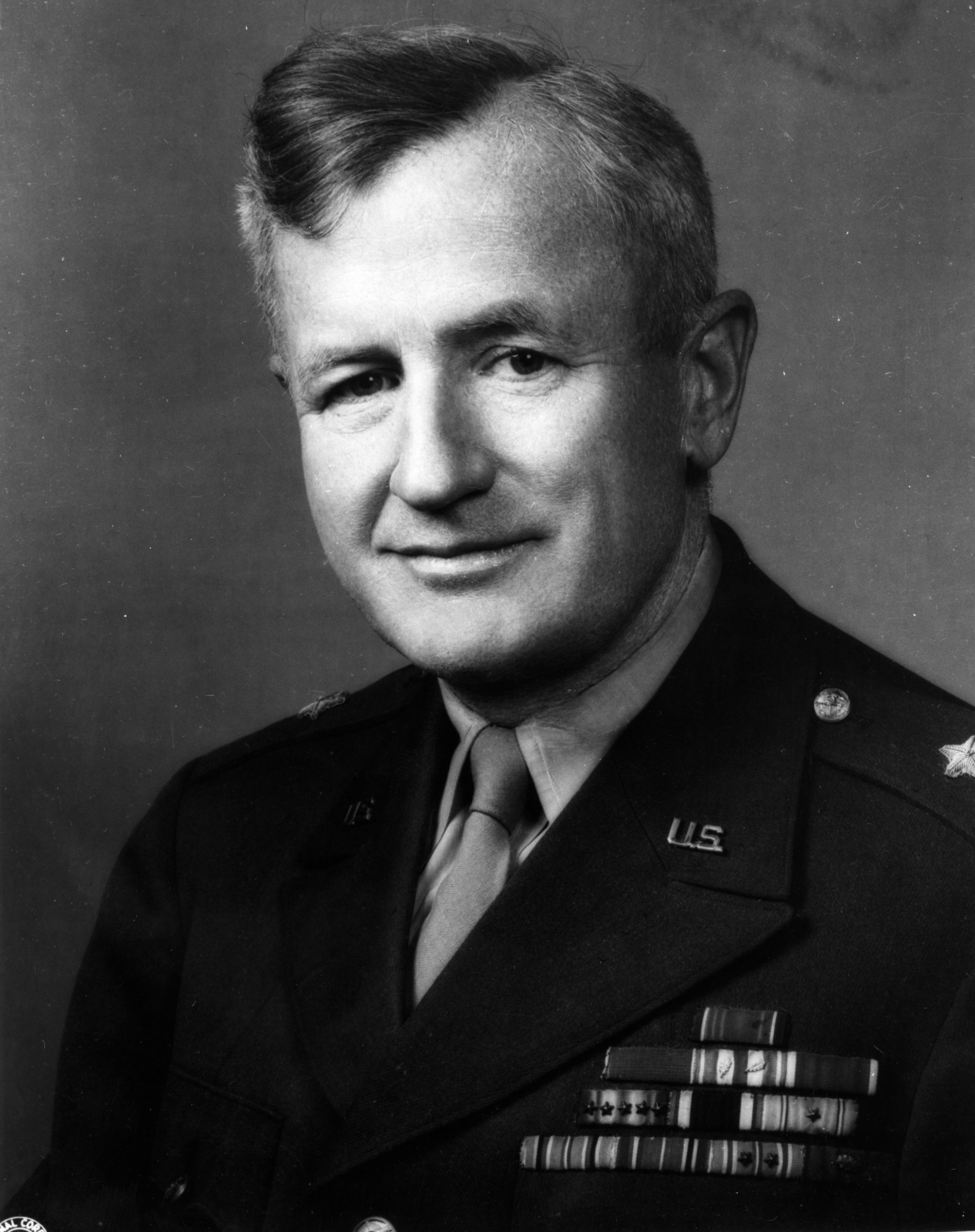
- Born: Thomas Francis Farrell; 3 December 1891; Brunswick, New York, U.S.
- Died: 11 April 1967 (aged 75); Reno, Nevada, U.S.
- Education: Rensselaer Polytechnic Institute (BS)
- Relatives: Barbara Vucanovich (daughter); Patricia Dillon Cafferata (granddaughter); Peter Farrell (great-grandson)
- Military career
- Allegiance: United States
- Branch: United States Army
- Service years: 1916–1946; 1950–1952
- Rank: Major General
- Service number: 0-227201
- Conflicts: World War I; Battle of Cantigny; Aisne-Marne Offensive; Battle of Montdidier-Noyon; Meuse-Argonne Offensive; Occupation of the Rhineland; World War II; Burma Campaign 1944–1945; Bombing of Hiroshima and Nagasaki; Occupation of Japan
- Awards: Distinguished Service Cross; Army Distinguished Service Medal; Legion of Merit (2); Purple Heart; Croix de guerre (France)

Major General Thomas Francis Farrell (3 December 1891 – 11 April 1967) was the Deputy Commanding General and Chief of Field Operations of the Manhattan Project, acting as executive officer to Major General Leslie R. Groves Jr.

Farrell graduated from Rensselaer Polytechnic Institute with a degree in civil engineering in 1912. During World War I, he served with the 1st Engineers on the Western Front, and was awarded the Distinguished Service Cross and the French Croix de guerre. After the war, he was an instructor at the Engineer School, and then at the United States Military Academy at West Point. He resigned from the Regular Army in 1926 to become Commissioner of Canals and Waterway for the State of New York from 1926 to 1930, and head of construction and engineering of the New York State Department of Public Works from 1930 until 1941.

During World War II he returned to active duty as Groves' executive officer in the Operations Branch of the Construction Division under the Office of the Quartermaster General. He went to the China-Burma-India theater to help build the Ledo Road. In January 1945, Groves chose Farrell as his second-in-command of the Manhattan Project. Farrell observed the Trinity test at the Alamogordo Bombing and Gunnery Range with J. Robert Oppenheimer. In August 1945, he went to Tinian to supervise the bombing of Hiroshima and Nagasaki. Afterwards he led teams of scientists to inspect the effects of the atomic bombs.

In 1946 he was appointed chairman of the New York City Housing Authority. He subsequently worked as a consultant for the Triborough Bridge and Tunnel Authority on projects such as the Cross Bronx Expressway. He was a member of the evaluation board for Operation Crossroads, and was an advisor to Bernard Baruch, the United States representative on the United Nations Atomic Energy Commission. During the Korean War, Farrell returned to active duty once more, serving with the Defense Production Administration, and then with the Atomic Energy Commission as its Assistant General Manager for Manufacturing. He oversaw a vast increase in the commission's production capabilities before retiring again in 1951. From 1960 to 1964, he worked on the preparations for the 1964 New York World's Fair.

== Early life ==
Thomas Francis Farrell was born on 3 December 1891 in Brunswick, New York, the fourth of nine children of John Joseph Farrell Sr., a farmer, and his wife Margaret née Connolly. Farrell was raised on the family's 200-acre (81 ha) farm, where his father had an apple orchard, and raised pigs and dairy cattle. The children helped with the farm chores, and delivering the milk, but none stayed on as adults. Farrell graduated from Rensselaer Polytechnic Institute in 1912. His first professional job was working on the New York State Barge Canal. Seeing Irish workers being mistreated by bosses made him a staunch supporter of organized labor. He worked on the Panama Canal from 1913 to 1916.

Farrell joined the Corps of Engineers Officers Reserve Corps in 1916. He married Maria Ynez White in 1917 before departing for France with the American Expeditionary Force (AEF). He joined the 1st Engineers with the rank of second lieutenant, and departed from Hoboken, New Jersey on the USAT Finland on 6 August as the assistant supply officer with the rank of first lieutenant. He became a captain and regimental supply officer in October, and subsequently, with the rank of major, commanded the 2nd Battalion from January to May 1918, Company F from May to July, and finally the 1st Battalion from July 1918.

Farrell participated in the Battle of Cantigny, the Aisne-Marne Offensive, the Battle of Montdidier-Noyon and the Meuse-Argonne Offensive. The 1st Engineers' main role was maintenance of the roads and construction of bridges in the 1st Division area, although detachments also employed Bangalore torpedoes to clear paths through barbed wire. However, during the Argonne battle, Farrell's 1st Battalion was committed to the line as infantry. For his leadership in the action that followed, he was awarded the Distinguished Service Cross. His citation read:

for extraordinary heroism in action while serving with 1st Engineers, 1st Division, A.E.F., at Bois-de-Moncy, France, October 8–9, 1918. On October 8 when ordered to take and hold Hill 269, which was strongly held by enemy forces, Major Farrell with great skill and with undaunted courage and determination led his battalion to the attack, seized and held this vital point despite the fact that he was attacked by greatly superior numbers on three sides and nearly surrounded by strong enemy forces who showed extraordinary determination to regain this highly important position. He held the hill until reinforcements could reach him after darkness had fallen on 9 October 1918. His fearless leadership, utter disregard for his own safety, and complete devotion to duty raised the morale of his battalion to a high pitch and inspired them to acts of great endeavor.

Farrell was also awarded the Croix de guerre with palm for his actions, and the 1st Battalion received a citation from Major General Charles Summerall, the commander of V Corps. After the Armistice with Germany in November 1918, the 1st Engineers participated in the occupation of the Rhineland, with Farrell's 1st Battalion basing itself at Ebernhahn. The 1st Engineers returned to the United States in August and September 1919. After the war, Farrell joined the Regular Army. He served as an instructor at the Engineer School at Camp A. A. Humphreys from 1921 to 1924, and then at the United States Military Academy at West Point until 1926.

Farrell resigned from the Regular Army in 1926, but remained in the reserves. The Governor of New York, Al Smith, appointed Farrell as Commissioner of Canals and Waterway for the State of New York. He was head of construction and engineering of the New York State Department of Public Works from 1930 until 1941. He was considered as a possible candidate to replace Frederick Stuart Greene as Superintendent of Public Works, but Greene did not retire. The Great Depression led to a vast expansion of public works activity, both nationally and in New York. Major projects in New York included the 1939 New York World's Fair at Flushing Meadows–Corona Park, as well as the construction of LaGuardia Airport.

== World War II ==
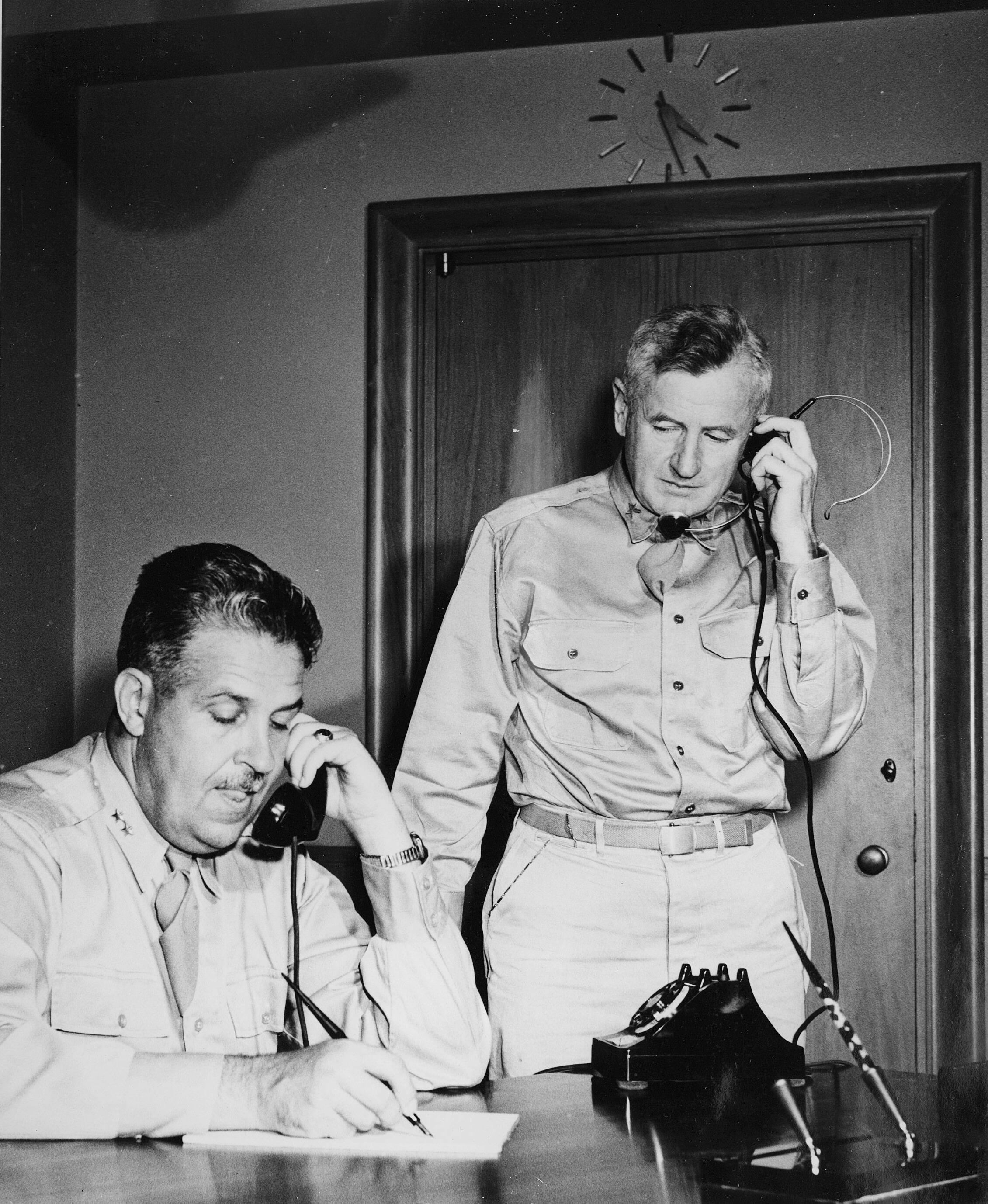
Farrell (right) and Major General Leslie R. Groves Jr. (left), in 1945

=== Construction in the United States ===
Farrell returned to active duty in February 1941 with the rank of lieutenant colonel to act as then-Colonel Leslie R. Groves Jr.'s executive officer in the Operations Branch of the Construction Division under the Office of the Office of the Quartermaster General. At this point, the US Army was about to embark on a national mobilization, and it was the task of the Construction Division of the Quartermaster Corps to prepare the necessary accommodations and training facilities for the vast army that would be created. The enormous construction program had been dogged by bottlenecks, shortages, delays, spiralling costs, and poor living conditions at the construction sites. Newspapers began publishing accounts charging the Construction Division with incompetence, ineptitude, and inefficiency. Farrell and Groves worked out new, simplified procedures for centralized procurement that provided the flexibility needed to get projects done on time with the accountability that such enormous expenditures demanded. He was awarded the Legion of Merit for his services.

=== China-Burma-India ===
In September 1943, the Chief of Army Service Forces, Lieutenant General Brehon B. Somervell, created a special India Committee to coordinate activities in the China-Burma-India theater with those of Army Service Forces back home. Farrell, now a colonel, was appointed to the committee to oversee construction. The creation of a line of communications from India to China would be the largest engineer undertaking of the war. A number of new units were trained in the United States specifically for the task. In a reorganization later that year, Farrell became Chief Engineer of the Services of Supply in the China-Burma-India theater. In December he also became head of its Construction Division.

Farrell, who was promoted to brigadier general in January 1944, organized his command into two divisions and six districts. He was in charge of the work inside India; construction of the Ledo Road itself was the responsibility of Colonel Lewis A. Pick. In addition to this work, Farrell had to support Operation Matterhorn, the deployment of B-29 bombers to China and India, which involved the construction and expansion of a series of air bases. The B-29s required runways that were almost twice the size of those for the older B-17s, and he was forced to divert his resources to construct a 6-inch (150 mm) oil pipeline to the Matterhorn airfields.

To bridge the fast-following rivers of northern Burma, Pick and Farrell selected the H-20 Portable Steel Highway Bridge. Production of these had been discontinued in favor of the Bailey bridge, but Farrell's technical arguments won out and the Corps of Engineers had to reinstate production of the H-20. In view of these difficulties, Farrell obtained Bailey bridges from British sources. In the end, all the major bridges beyond the Irrawaddy River would be Baileys. He also made the decision, controversial in Washington, to shift the terminus of the 6-inch (150 mm) oil pipeline from Calcutta to Chittagong in order to avoid crossing the Ganges and Brahmaputra Rivers, and the dangers of concentrating too many vulnerable installations in the Calcutta area. He was awarded the Distinguished Service Medal.

=== Manhattan Project ===
In December 1944, the Secretary of War, Henry L. Stimson, ordered Groves, now the Director of the Manhattan Project, to find a deputy. Stimson was concerned about what would happen if Groves became incapacitated. "You can have any officer in the Army," Stimson told Groves, "no matter who he is, or what duty he is on." Groves told Colonel Kenneth Nichols, the commander of the Manhattan District, that his first choice would be Farrell. Nichols replied: "He would be my first choice too." "Site Y" was the code name for the remote Los Alamos County, New Mexico facilities that housed the main group of researchers and was responsible for final assembly of the bombs.

Farrell was briefed on the physics of the atomic bomb by Robert Oppenheimer, and he made several extended tours of the Alamogordo Bombing and Gunnery Range, which had been chosen as the site for the Trinity test. On signing a receipt for the plutonium from Oak Ridge, Farrell commented:

I recall that I asked them if I was going to sign for it shouldn't I take it and handle it. So I took this heavy ball in my hand and I felt it growing warm, I got a certain sense of its hidden power. It wasn't a cold piece of metal, but it was really a piece of metal that seemed to be working inside. Then maybe for the first time I began to believe some of the fantastic tales the scientists had told about this nuclear power.

Farrell observed the Trinity (nuclear test) with Oppenheimer from the control dugout located 10,000 yards (9,100 m) from the test tower. He initially said to a fellow officer The long-hairs have let it get away from them. In his report on the test to President Truman on 21 July 1945, Farrell stated:

The effects could well be called unprecedented, magnificent, beautiful, stupendous, and terrifying. No man-made phenomenon of such tremendous power had ever occurred before...It lit every peak, crevasse and ridge of the nearby mountain range with a clarity and beauty that cannot be described but must be seen to be imagined. Seconds after the explosion came, the air blast pressed hard against the people watching, to be followed almost immediately by the strong, sustained, awesome roar which warned of doomsday and made us feel we puny things were blasphemous to dare tamper with the forces previously reserved for the Almighty. Words are inadequate tools for the job of acquainting those not present with the physical, mental and psychological effects. It had to be witnessed to be realized.

.

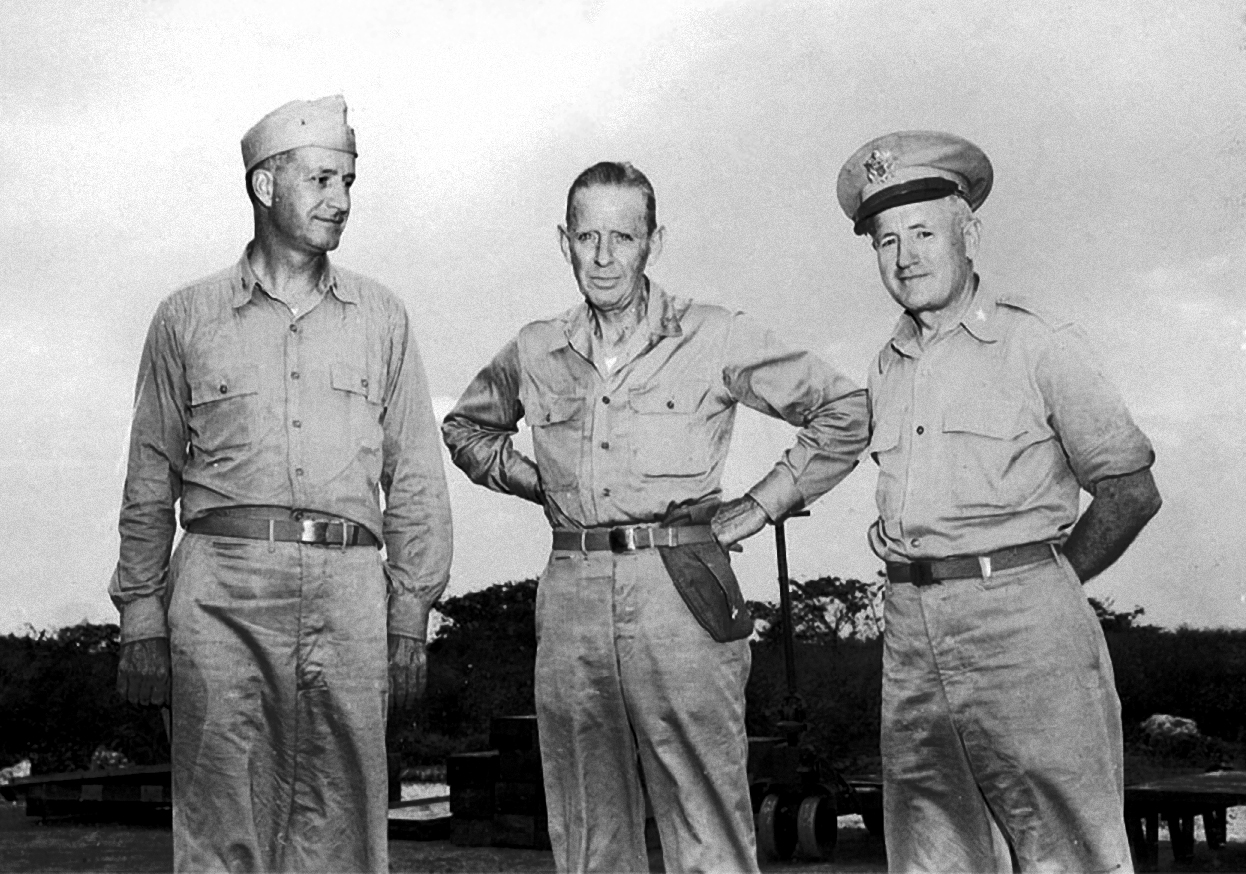
The "Tinian Joint Chiefs": Captain William S. Parsons (left), Rear Admiral William R. Purnell (center), and Brigadier General Thomas F. Farrell (right)

Farrell assumed special responsibility for combat operations. He served on the target committee, acting as its chairman when Groves was absent. In July 1945, Farrell arrived on Guam to coordinate the project with the local commanders. One of his tasks was to brief General of the Army Douglas MacArthur, which he did on July 26. Farrell was joined by Rear Admiral William R. Purnell, who represented the Military Liaison Committee, and Captain William S. Parsons, the commander of Project Alberta. They became, informally, the "Tinian Joint Chiefs", with decision-making authority over the nuclear mission.

Farrell notified Groves that the Little Boy bomb would be ready for use on or about 3 August, weather permitting. In the space of a week on Tinian, four B-29s crashed and burned on the runway. Parsons became very concerned. If a B-29 crashed with a Little Boy, the fire could cook off the explosive and detonate the weapon, with catastrophic consequences. Parsons raised the possibility of arming the bomb in flight with Farrell, who agreed that it might be a good idea. Farrell asked Parsons if he knew how to do it. "No sir, I don't", Parsons conceded, "but I've got all afternoon to learn." After the bombing of Hiroshima on 6 August, Farrell, along with Generals Carl Spaatz, Nathan Twining, Barney Giles and James H. Davies, debriefed Parsons, the aircrews and the observers, and sent Groves a detailed report.

Farrell brought forward the date for the next attack because good weather was only predicted until 9 August. He signed the Fat Man bomb, "To Hirohito, with love and kisses, T. F. Farrell." The bomb was loaded on the B-29 Bockscar. During pre-flight inspection, a fuel pump was found to be faulty, meaning that 800 US gallons (3,000 L; 670 imp gal) of fuel in the bomb bay tank could not be used, although it would have to be carried. Farrell took the difficult decision to continue the mission, in view of the worsening weather. This was only the first of a number of problems that faced the mission crews that day, but the mission was carried out successfully.

The surrender of Japan on 14 August precluded further attacks. Groves had already directed Farrell to prepare teams to inspect the effects of the atomic bombs on Hiroshima and Nagasaki, and Farrell had begun assembling the required personnel and equipment. Farrell arrived in Hiroshima by air on 8 September as part of a group, equipped with portable geiger counters, that was headed by himself, and also included Brigadier General James B. Newman, Jr from the US Army Air Forces, Japanese Rear Admiral Masao Tsuzuki, who acted as a translator, and Colonel Stafford L. Warren, the head of the Manhattan District's Medical Section. They remained in Hiroshima until 14 September and then surveyed Nagasaki from 19 September to 8 October. They were greatly impressed by both the damage done by the atomic bombs, and the extensive Japanese preparations for the Allied invasion that had been planned prior to the surrender.

== Post-war ==
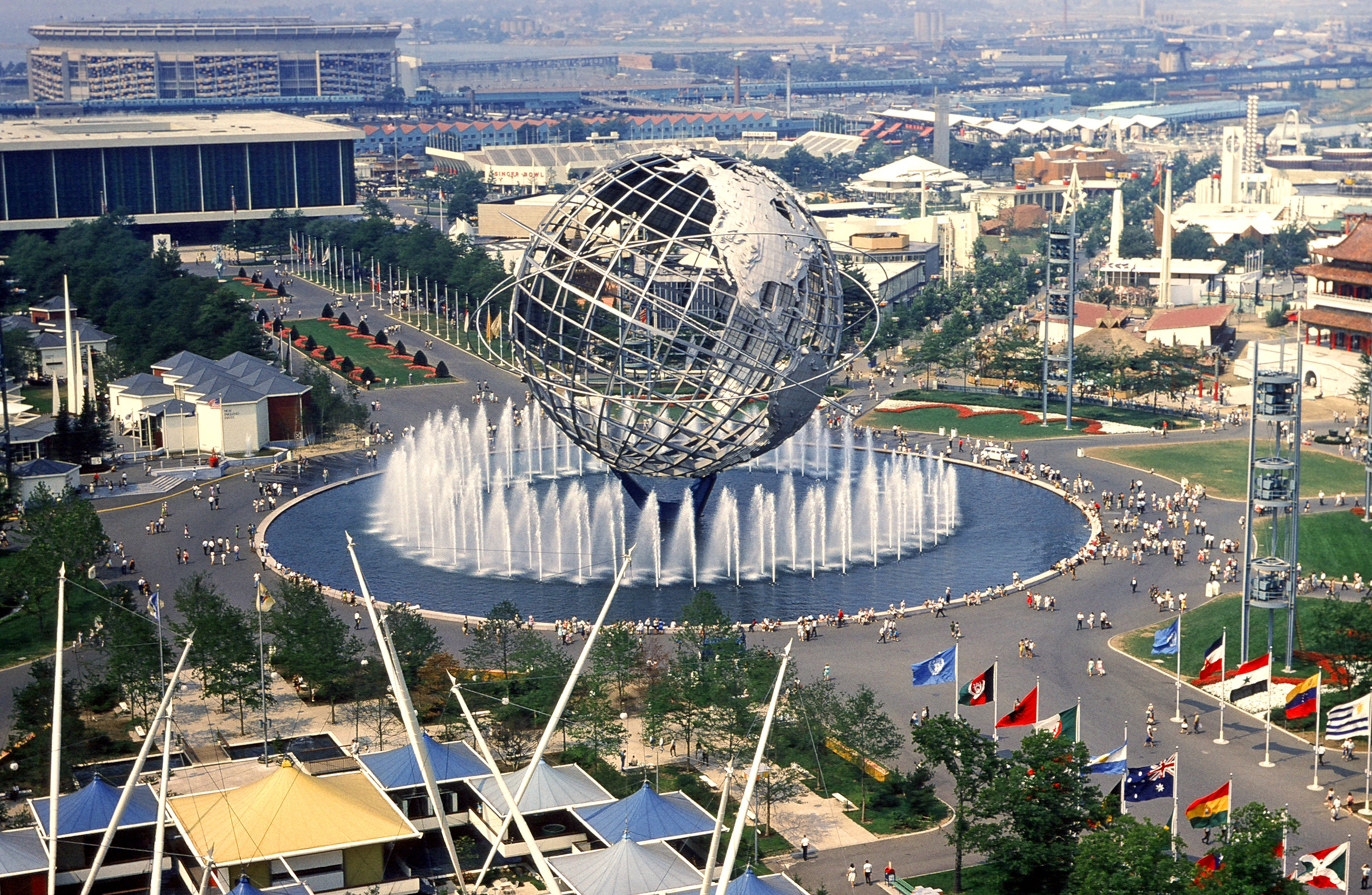
View of the 1964 New York World's Fair from the observation towers of the New York State Pavilion; the Unisphere is in the center, Shea Stadium background left.

Farrell was promoted to the rank of major general in October 1945. He remained Deputy Commander of the Manhattan Project until he retired from active service in April 1946. He was appointed chairman of the New York City Housing Authority by Mayor William O'Dwyer on Robert Moses's recommendation. In the aftermath of the war, providing public housing, especially for returning veterans, was a major priority for the city. Unlike other projects of the time, New York City public housing was not racially segregated. Writing in 1950, Farrell declared, "New York's public housing projects demonstrate that Negroes and whites can live together."

He served as a member of the evaluation board for Operation Crossroads, and was an advisor to Bernard Baruch, the United States' representative on the United Nations Atomic Energy Commission. In 1950, during the Korean War, Farrell returned to active duty with the Army once more, and served with the Defense Production Administration. In July 1951, he was transferred to the Atomic Energy Commission (AEC), the successor organization to the Manhattan Project, where he became the Assistant General Manager for Manufacturing. In this role, he oversaw a vast increase in the commission's production capabilities. The construction of new reactors at the Hanford and Savannah River Sites would eventually triple the production of nuclear weapons.

Farrell left the AEC and active duty Army again in February 1952. He subsequently worked as a consultant for the Triborough Bridge and Tunnel Authority on projects such as the Cross Bronx Expressway. From 1960 to 1964, he worked on the preparations for the 1964 New York World's Fair at Flushing Meadows–Corona Park.

His children were Thomas, Barbara, Peter, Patricia, and Stephen. Thomas graduated from West Point in the class of 1942, received the Silver Star Medal and the Distinguished Service Cross, and reached the rank of captain before being killed at Anzio on 25 February 1944. An Army port repair ship, the Thomas F. Farrell Jr., was named in his honor. Peter graduated from West Point in the class of 1950. He served with the Army in the Vietnam War, where he commanded the 6th Battalion, 56th Air Defense Artillery during the Tet Offensive. He retired from the Army in 1978 with the rank of colonel. Farrell's daughter, Barbara Vucanovich, was the first woman from Nevada to be elected to the United States House of Representatives, serving from 1983 to 1997. His granddaughter, Patricia Dillon Cafferata, served as Nevada State Treasurer from 1983 to 1987. Farrell died at Saint Mary's Hospital in Reno, Nevada, on 11 April 1967. His wife Ynez had died the year before..

== In popular culture ==
He was portrayed by Henry O'Neill in The Beginning or the End, a docudrama about the Manhattan Project.
