= Defense Production Administration =

The Defense Production Administration (DPA) was an independent agency of the United States government for oversight and control of the defense production programs of the United States during wartime mobilization in the Korean War era.

== History and mandate ==
By authority of the Defense Production Act of 1950, President Harry S. Truman established the Office of Defense Mobilization (ODM) by Executive Order 10193, issued December 16, 1950. ODM's charge was to regulate the economy so that defense production needs could be met, even if this meant restricting the flow of goods and services to the civilian sector of the economy.

The Defense Production Administration was established by Executive Order 10200 on January 3, 1951. Its mandate was to oversee the federal government's defense production program, which included materials production, manufacturing conversion, setting of production quotas, and establishing the mix of defense and civilian production. It was placed under the Office of Defense Mobilization, along with the Wage Stabilization Board, the Office of Price Administration, and other wartime agencies. The National Production Authority (NPA) was placed under the control of the Defense Production Administration. Although most of the NPA's functions were transferred to the Defense Production Administration, the agency re-delegated them back to NPA. Indeed, most of the agencies which fell under authority of the DPA remained, organizationally, within their respective cabinet departments.

The Defense Production Administration was abolished after the inauguration of President Dwight D. Eisenhower on February 4, 1953, in Executive Order 10433. Its functions were transferred to its parent agency, the Office of Defense Mobilization.

== Leadership ==
William Henry Harrison, former president of International Telephone & Telegraph and administrator of the National Production Authority, was named as the first director of the DPA. Harrison resigned after only a short time on the job.

Manly Fleischmann was named the agency's second administrator in late 1951. Fleischmann resigned in May 1952.

Henry H. Fowler was named the agency's last director. He led the DPA from 1952 to 1953, serving concurrently as the administrator of the NPA.
