= Office of Defense Mobilization =

United States government agency

The Office of Defense Mobilization (ODM) was an independent agency of the United States government whose function was to plan, coordinate, direct and control all wartime mobilization activities of the federal government, including manpower, economic stabilization, and transport operations. It was established in 1950, and for three years was one of the most powerful agencies in the federal government. It merged with other agencies in 1958 to become the Office of Civil and Defense Mobilization (1958–1961).

== Background ==
President Franklin D. Roosevelt's pre-war mobilization efforts had been resisted by Congress, and lacked coordination. One of the most important lessons the federal government drew from World War II was that the nation needed a permanent, rationalized mobilization apparatus. The nature of nuclear war, in which mobilization would occur in weeks rather than months, made the establishment of a mobilization structure even more imperative.

The National Security Act of 1947 established this new mobilization structure. It authorized the creation of the National Security Council (NSC) and the Central Intelligence Agency, merged the Departments of War (Army and Air Force) and Navy into the Department of Defense (DOD), and established the nation's first mobilization agency, the National Security Resources Board (NSRB). The Act restricted DOD to the employment of military power and placed mobilization responsibilities with the NSRB.

By 1950, however, the NSRB was dormant and DOD had recaptured authority over military procurement. When North Korea invaded South Korea on June 25, 1950, President Harry S. Truman attempted to use the NSRB as the nation's mobilization agency. Truman quadrupled the defense budget to $50 billion, and the NSRB placed controls on prices, wages and raw materials. Inflation soared and shortages in food, consumer goods and housing appeared. By October 1950, inflation had abated and shortages were easing. The intervention of China in the Korean War unraveled the administration's mobilization effort. A panicked public began hoarding and the administration accelerated its rearmament plans. Inflation jumped from 1.3 percent to 7.9 percent. By December, public support for the war had fallen significantly, both Truman and his intelligence experts expected World War III to break out by spring, and Senator Joseph McCarthy was using the military setbacks in Korea to attack the administration and push his own political agenda.

Confronted with the failure of the NSRB, an economy on the verge of collapse, and a mobilization effort which was faltering and unable to meet the needs of accelerated production plans, President Truman declared a national emergency on December 16, 1950. Using the powers granted to him by the Defense Production Act (which had been enacted only in September 1950), Truman created the Office of Defense Mobilization.

== Structure ==
The Office of Defense Mobilization was established by Executive Order 10193 on December 16, 1950. The agency was led by a presidentially-appointed director, who was subject to confirmation by the Senate and who was a member of the NSC.

ODM was part of the Executive Office of the President. ODM consisted of two main organizational components: The Defense Production Administration, which established production goals and supervised production operations; and the Economic Stabilization Agency, which coordinated and supervised wage and price controls. In all, 19 mobilization agencies were eventually created within ODM to control every aspect of the American economy.

=== Directors ===
Denotes acting capacity.

Name	Start	End	President
Charles Wilson	December 16, 1950	March 31, 1952	Harry S. Truman
John Steelman; Acting	March 31, 1952	September 8, 1952	Harry S. Truman
Henry Fowler	September 8, 1952	January 20, 1953	Harry S. Truman
Arthur Flemming	January 20, 1953	March 14, 1957	Dwight D. Eisenhower
Gordon Gray	March 14, 1957	June 24, 1958	Dwight D. Eisenhower

== History ==
Truman named Charles E. Wilson, president of General Electric and a government mobilization chief in World War II, to head the ODM. Wilson became one of the most powerful people in the federal government, and the press began calling him "co-president".

Wilson quickly took control of the economy. All raw materials were under the control of ODM, which rationed them to the civilian economy. Production quotas were set, and businesses ordered to supply the government with goods and services. Companies which failed to meet their production quotas were threatened with seizure by ODM. Companies found to be secretly diverting raw materials to civilian uses were severely punished through the withdrawal of lucrative government contracts, fines, and the imposition of government supervisors on-site at the workplace. Defense plants, concentrated at the time near existing manufacturing centers and where electrical power was plentiful, were dispersed across the Southeast and Deep South. The government restricted investment in new plant equipment so that only investments meeting national security needs were made. Additionally, ODM invested millions of dollars in new plant and equipment to rapidly expand production capacity. Strict price controls were placed on all goods and services, and wages were subject to federal government approval and control. Black marketeers were severely punished with fines and jail sentences. Wilson's austerity program worked: By 1951, inflation had fallen back to 1.9 percent, and the economy was no longer threatened with recession.

Nevertheless, national production capacity continued to lag. In August 1951, additional controls were placed on the economy. Any manufacturer seeking raw materials had to first obtain a permit from ODM before purchasing such materials. ODM also began to control the use of steel for building and automobile production, even significantly restricting the building of public schools to divert additional steel to national defense needs.

=== Ban on color TV ===
On October 25, 1951, ODM ordered a halt to the mass production of color television sets by CBS. CBS had developed a color system which was partly mechanical and partly electronic in nature. RCA had already developed a purely electronic color television system, and was engaged in a long and bitter legal battle with CBS before the Federal Communications Commission (FCC) over which system would be adopted. Although ODM had determined that research on color TV occupied the time of critically needed scientists and technicians, the research also had defense applications and could therefore proceed. However, production of the CBS color TV sets was not essential, and was banned. The ban on mass production of the CBS color television set led the FCC to choose the RCA system by default in 1953. That system was used in the US until June 12, 2009, when it was succeeded by the ATSC set of standards.

=== 1952 steel strike ===
In 1951 and 1952, ODM became embroiled in a steel strike which led to a landmark ruling by the United States Supreme Court.

In October 1951, the United Steel Workers of America (USWA) began negotiating with U.S. Steel and five other major steelmakers for a wage increase. ODM had announced earlier in the year that there would be no increase in the price of steel. The steelmakers refused to engage in good-faith collective bargaining until ODM guaranteed that they would receive an increase in the price of steel, and their bargaining tactics were designed to force ODM to change its policy. The union authorized a strike to begin on January 1, 1952. But after President Truman pleaded with the union for a delay, USWA president Philip Murray agreed to postpone the strike for 60 days.

President Truman referred the wage dispute to ODM's Wage Stabilization Board (WSB). In March 1952, the WSB recommended a 16.5-cent-an-hour wage increase. The steelmakers lobbied Congress, DOD and defense manufacturers, opposing any wage increase unless there was an accompanying price increase. The pressure led Congress to threaten to overturn any WSB wage increase. Republicans demanded that the president invoke the Taft-Hartley Act and force the steelworkers back to work. But Truman, needing labor's support in the 1952 presidential campaign, refused to do so.

Wilson resigned as director of ODM on March 31, 1952, in protest against Truman's support of the union. Presidential aide John R. Steelman became Acting Director of ODM. Truman was unwilling to order Steelman to implement the wage increase for fear it would ruin his wage policies, but he was also unwilling to rein in the union.

With no wage increase forthcoming, the union gave notice on April 4, 1952, that it would strike at 12:01 a.m. on April 9.

A few hours before the strike was to begin, Truman issued Executive Order 10340, which directed Secretary of Commerce Charles W. Sawyer to take possession of and operate steel mills throughout the country. Truman sent messages to Congress on April 9 and again on April 21 announcing his action.

The steel companies, led by Youngstown Sheet and Tube, filed suit in federal district court seeking a preliminary injunction preventing Sawyer from seizing the steel mills. The District Court for the District of Columbia refused to grant a preliminary injunction, and scheduled a trial to be held on April 25. Despite this initial setback, the steelmakers were successful: The district court granted a permanent injunction on April 25. The government appealed to the Court of Appeals for the District of Columbia Circuit. The Court of Appeals, sitting en banc, stayed the permanent injunction on May 2 pending resolution of the case by the U.S. Supreme Court.

A meeting between USWA and the steelmakers on May 3 nearly led to a tentative agreement on the union's terms. But during the meeting, word arrived that the Supreme Court had granted certiorari and accepted the case. The steelmakers backed out of the agreement, hoping that the court would rule in their favor.

The Supreme Court heard oral argument for two days, May 12 and May 13. Arguing the case for the government was Solicitor General Philip B. Perlman, and representing the union was Arthur Goldberg, general counsel for the USWA and the Congress of Industrial Organizations (and a future Supreme Court justice). Former Solicitor General John W. Davis argued the case for the steelmakers.

On June 2, 1952, the Supreme Court handed down its decision. In Youngstown Sheet & Tube Co. v. Sawyer, 343 U.S. 579 (1952)—a landmark case on the scope of presidential powers—the Court ruled that the president lacked the authority to seize the steel mills. The Court said the President had no authority under the Constitution to seize private property during national emergency. Absent a declaration of war, the President required Congressional authorization to seize the steel mills, and this the chief executive lacked.

The government returned the mills to their owners hours later.

The USWA struck on June 4. The strike lasted 51 days. The supply of steel shrank to almost nothing, armament deliveries dropped by 25 percent, and ammunition and airplane assembly plants shut down. Truman began preparations to draft the steelworkers into the military under Section 18 of the Selective Service Act of 1948, and public opinion began to turn against the union. These factors led Murray to agree to negotiations with the steelmakers.

The strike ended on July 24, 1952. The USWA achieved a 16-cent-an-hour wage increase, and an increase in fringe benefits of about 6-cents-an-hour. The union also achieved a form of the closed shop.

Because of perceived favoritism toward the union, Congress stripped the Wage Stabilization Board of most of its powers in late 1952.

=== End of the Korean War ===
Henry H. Fowler was sworn in as director of ODM on September 8, 1952. Fowler led both ODM and its sub-agency, the National Production Authority, during his tenure as director of ODM.

The Korean War ended less than a year later, on July 27, 1953. Although ODM relaxed most production, wage and price controls by the fall, many restrictions continued as the Cold War worsened.

After the election of Dwight D. Eisenhower as president in November 1952, Fowler resigned from ODM in early 1953.

Eisenhower appointed Arthur Flemming ODM director. Flemming served for most of the Eisenhower administration, overseeing the conversion of the defense industry to civilian uses. Flemming resigned on February 6, 1957.

Eisenhower appointed Gordon Gray director of ODM on March 14, 1957.

Gray's tenure was short-lived, however. In early 1958, pursuant to the authority granted the chief executive under the "Reorganization Act of 1949" (5 U.S.C. 901), President Eisenhower issued Reorganization Plan No. 1 of 1958. The Plan, to take effect on July 1, 1958, consolidated ODM with the Federal Civil Defense Administration. The successor agency was titled the Office of Defense and Civilian Mobilization (ODCM) and then renamed the Office of Civil and Defense Mobilization.

== Assessment ==
ODM radically changed the way the federal government approached defense procurement and mobilization. Much of the subsequent Cold War defense procurement apparatus was created by ODM, and still exists to this day.

ODM also made long-lasting economic changes to America's industrial base, changes which led to unintended political and demographic consequences. ODM shifted most of the nation's defense plants away from the Northeast and Midwest to the West, Southwest, and Southeast. This contributed to a 50-year industrial decline in the former two regions from which they have not yet recovered. Meanwhile, large numbers of workers moved South and West to seek employment with defense and defense-related firms. This contributed to realignment in the nation's political power structure. ODM also initiated the dispersal of defense plants to protect the nation's industrial base against enemy attack. These economic changes had unintended consequences which helped lead to the political ascendancy of the West and South.
