= Sakura Hotel =

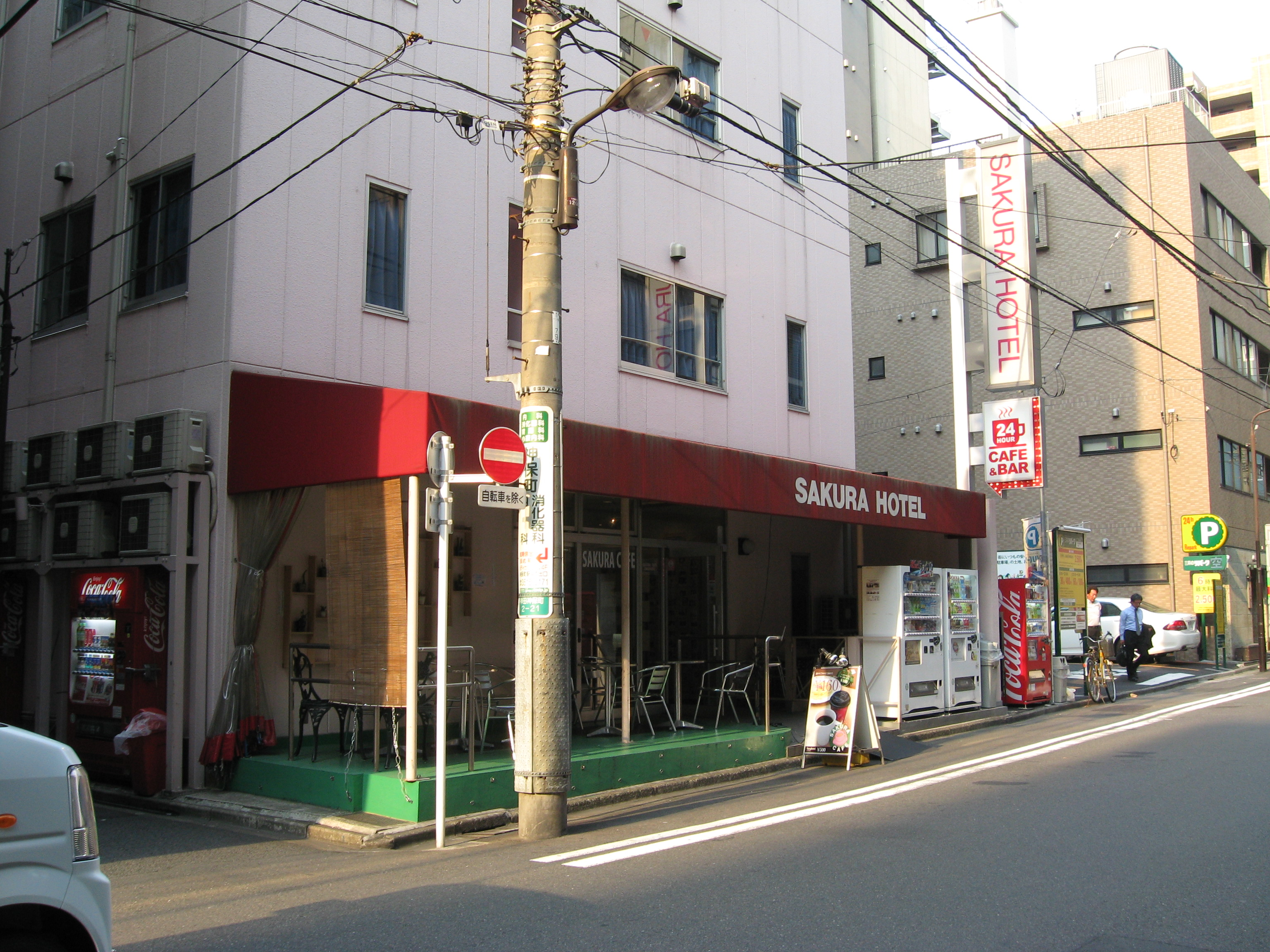
- Headquarters: Tokyo, Japan
- Key people: Masayuki Tsukumo (CEO)
- Number of employees: 40
- Website: sakura-hotel.co.jp

Sakura Hotel (サクラホテル) is a Japanese hotel chain, consisting of four hotels in Asakusa, Ikebukuro, Jimbocho, and Hatagaya, all in central Tokyo.
