= Henry H. Fowler =

American lawyer and politician (1908–2000)

Henry Fowler
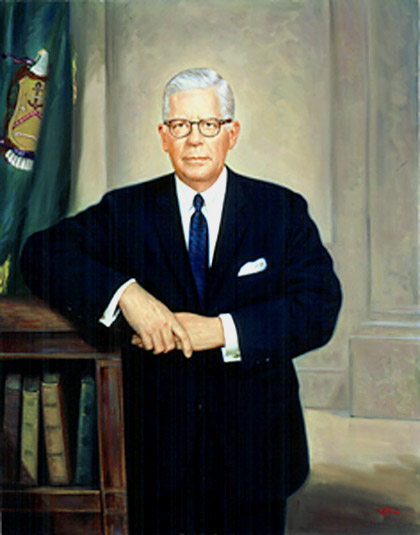

58th United States Secretary of the Treasury
- In office April 1, 1965 – December 20, 1968
- President: Lyndon B. Johnson
- Preceded by: C. Douglas Dillon
- Succeeded by: Joseph W. Barr

Director of the Office of Defense Mobilization
- In office September 8, 1952 – January 20, 1953
- President: Harry S. Truman
- Preceded by: John R. Steelman (Acting)
- Succeeded by: Arthur Flemming

Personal details
- Born: Henry Hammill Fowler; September 5, 1908 Roanoke, Virginia, U.S.
- Died: January 3, 2000 (aged 91) Alexandria, Virginia, U.S.
- Party: Democratic
- Spouse: Trudye Hathcote
- Children: 3
- Education: Roanoke College (BA); Yale University (LLB, SJD)

Henry Hammill Fowler (September 5, 1908 – January 3, 2000) was an American lawyer and politician who served as the United States Secretary of the Treasury under President Lyndon B. Johnson.

Born in Roanoke, Virginia, in 1908, Fowler graduated from Roanoke College and later earned his law degree from Yale Law School. After working briefly at Covington & Burling in Washington, D.C., Fowler joined the legal staff of the Tennessee Valley Authority (TVA) in 1934, where he helped establish the constitutionality of the program. He went on to serve in various government positions, including Assistant General Counsel of the Office of Production Management and Director of the Office of Defense Mobilization. After leaving government service, Fowler returned to private law practice, and later became a partner at Goldman Sachs.

Fowler died of pneumonia in Alexandria, Virginia, in 2000 at the age of 91.

== Early life and career ==
Fowler was born in Roanoke, Virginia, on September 5, 1908. He was the son of Mack Johnson Fowler, a locomotive engineer, and his wife, the former Bertha (née Browning). Henry Fowler graduated from Jefferson High School in 1925 and went on to graduate from Roanoke College in 1929, where he joined Pi Kappa Phi, played many sports, and edited the college newspaper. He received his law degree from Yale Law School in 1933.

He worked briefly at Covington & Burling in Washington, D.C., then joined the legal staff of the Tennessee Valley Authority (TVA) in 1934. There he assisted in the preparation and successful conduct of the four-year litigation establishing the constitutionality of that program. By 1939, he had risen to Assistant General Counsel of the TVA and subsequently served as chief counsel of a subcommittee of the U.S. Senate Committee on Education and Labor.

On October 19, 1938, Fowler married Trudye Pamela Hathcote (1910–2008). They had one son and two daughters: Henry Hammill Jr., Marianne Fowler Smith and Susan Fowler-Gallagher.

Fowler and his family sponsored a public policy program at Roanoke College that has brought guests such as Sandra Day O'Connor to speak to College students and members of the community.

== Wartime career ==
From 1941 to 1944, he was an assistant general counsel of the Office of Production Management and afterward of the War Production Board. He then served in the United Kingdom and Germany in 1944 and 1945. He returned to private practice and in 1951 rejoined the government to work on the mobilization of troops during the Korean War. During this period he was an administrator of the National Production Authority, administrator of the Defense Production Administration, Director of the Office of Defense Mobilization and member of the National Security Council.

== Postwar career ==
With the onset of the Eisenhower administration, Fowler returned to his private law practice and served on the Democratic Advisory Council, which helped outline party positions on many issues. Fowler served as a member of the Commission on Money and Credit from 1958 to 1961, and of the National Committee on Government Finance of the Brookings Institution from 1960 to 1961. He was a Trustee of Roanoke College and of the Funds in the Episcopal Diocese of Virginia.

He served as the Under Secretary of the Treasury, from February 3, 1961, until April 10, 1964. He spent was the most of his time at Treasury working on passage of the administration's tax program, which included an $11.5 billion tax cut. He then he returned to private law practice as senior member of the Washington firm of Fowler, Leva, Hawes and Symington. When C. Douglas Dillon resigned, Fowler served as Secretary of the Treasury from April 1, 1965, to December 20, 1968, Fowler was known for his loyalty to Johnson throughout the administration's ups and downs. He was described as having "a ruddy face, southern charm and a conservative outlook".

The major problems facing Fowler were inflation and the balance of payments deficit. In August 1967, Fowler began the fight for a 10 percent tax surcharge and saw the proposal passed by a House–Senate conference in June 1968. In the debate over the balance of payments deficit, Fowler was a proponent of the "go-slow" approach. Fowler organized a two-tier system for gold in 1968, and participated in the 1967–68 international agreements, which created a new international monetary reserve system called "special drawing rights". He proposed (1967) a seminar (taken up by then Chancellor of the Exchequer James Callaghan) of financial officials from rich countries, the forerunner of the Group of Five. He also ended silver coinage in the United States.

After leaving the Treasury Department, Fowler became a partner with Goldman Sachs in New York City, New York.

== Death ==
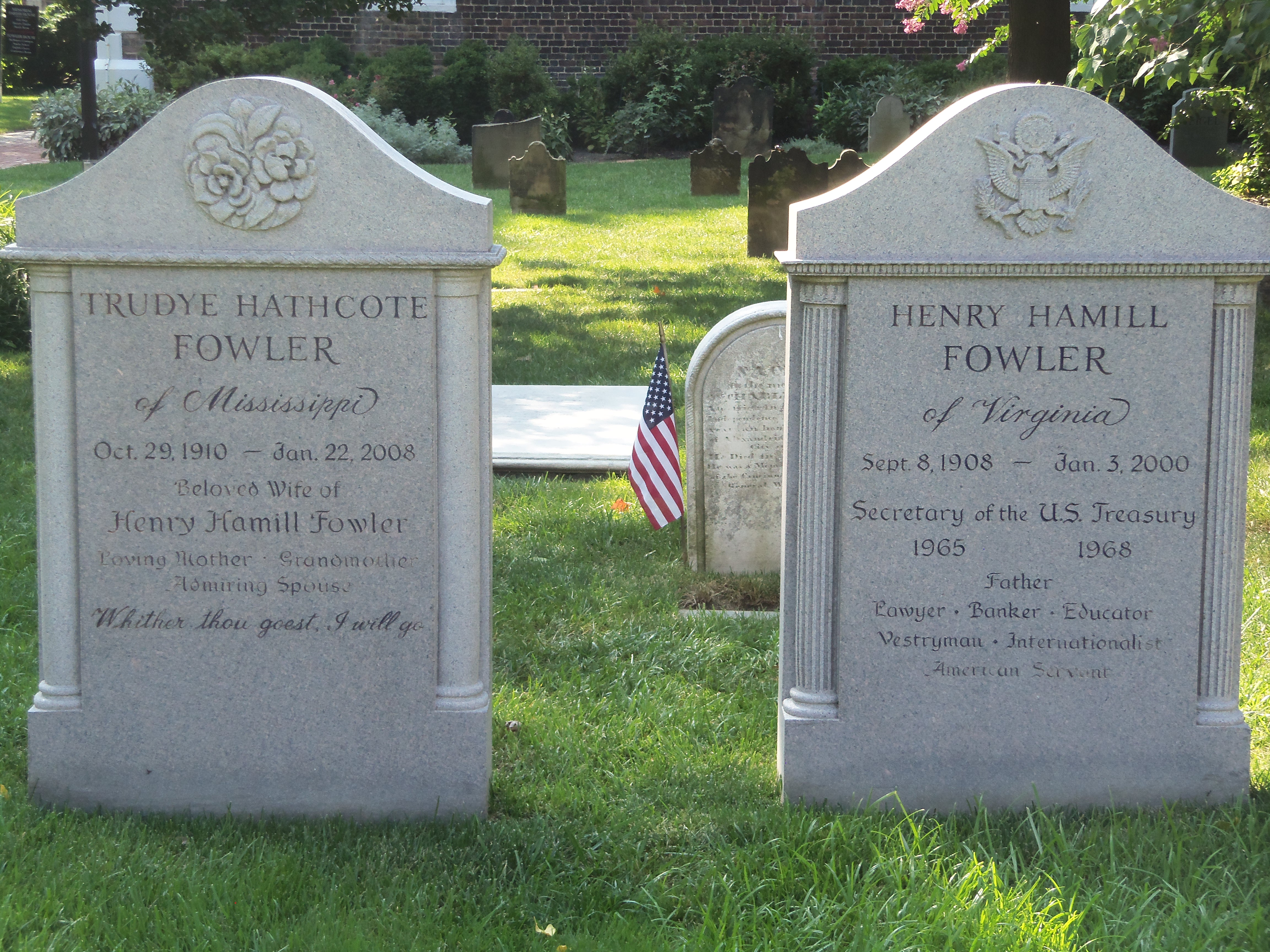
Henry and Trudye Fowler's grave

Fowler died of pneumonia in Alexandria, Virginia, on January 3, 2000, at the age of 91. He was buried in the Episcopal Christ Church Cemetery in Alexandria. His wife of 61 years died at age 97 on January 22, 2008, in her Alexandria home.

== Notes ==
Political offices
Preceded by John R. Steelman; Acting	Director of the Office of Defense Mobilization; 1952–1953	Succeeded by Arthur Sherwood Flemming
Preceded by C. Douglas Dillon	United States Secretary of the Treasury; 1965–1968	Succeeded by Joseph W. Barr
