= John R. Steelman =

American politician (1900–1999)

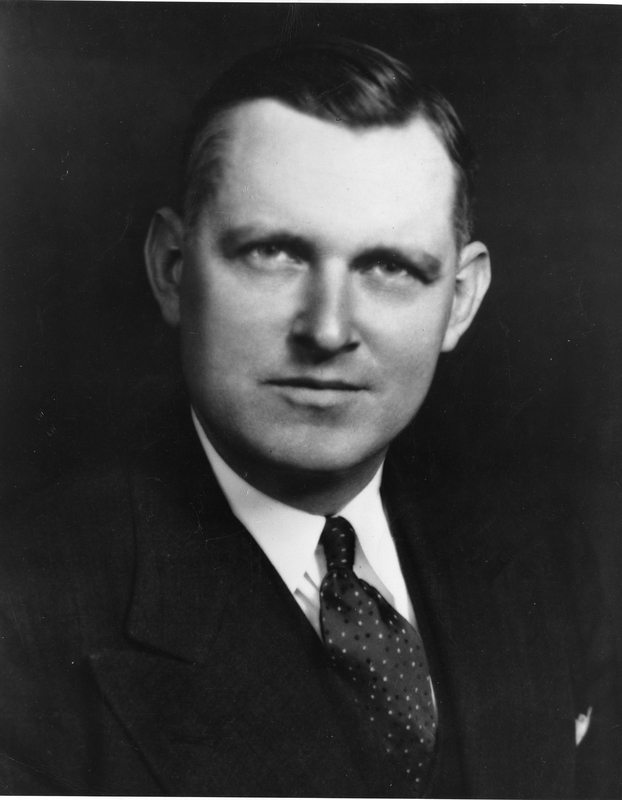
- Official portrait, 1937

1st White House Chief of Staff
- In office December 12, 1946 – January 20, 1953
- President: Harry S. Truman
- Preceded by: Position established
- Succeeded by: Sherman Adams

Director of the Office of Defense Mobilization
- Acting; March 31, 1952 – September 8, 1952
- President: Harry S. Truman
- Preceded by: Charles Wilson
- Succeeded by: Henry H. Fowler

Personal details
- Born: John Roy Steelman; June 23, 1900 Thornton, Arkansas, U.S
- Died: July 14, 1999 (aged 99) Naples, Florida, U.S.
- Resting place: Arlington National Cemetery
- Education: Henderson State University (BA); Vanderbilt University (MA); University of North Carolina, Chapel Hill (PhD)

John Roy Steelman (June 23, 1900 – July 14, 1999) was the first person to serve as "The Assistant to the President of the United States", in the administration of President Harry S. Truman from 1946 to 1953. The office later became the White House Chief of Staff.

He holds the record for the longest term as Chief of Staff at six years.

== Early life and education ==
John Roy Steelman was born on a farm in Thornton, Arkansas, the son of Martha Ann (née Richardson) and Pleasant C. Steelman. After graduating from high school, he served in World War I. To save money for college tuition, he held jobs that included bookkeeping, logging and agriculture. He rode the railways to Wichita, Kansas, to work in the wheat fields and proudly recalled his time as a blanket stiff, the label used among hobos for a migrant laborer who carried his blanket with him.

Steelman was a descendant of Cpt. Hans Månsson and his wife Ella Stille. Hans was a Swedish soldier, as well as a convicted criminal, who became a respected leader in both New Sweden and the Dutch New Netherland. Ella was the daughter of Olof Persson Stille, a New Swedish Chief Justice. The couple had six sons together. After Han's death, Ella and her sons adopted the surname Steelman, presumably from a combination of her maiden name Stille and her husband's patronym, Måns.

Steelman attended Henderson Brown College in Arkadelphia, Arkansas and graduated in 1922. He later went to Vanderbilt University, where he earned his MA in 1924. He received his Ph.D. in 1928 from University of North Carolina in economics and sociology. He was Professor of Sociology and Economics in Alabama College in Montevallo, Alabama from 1928 to 1934.

== Career ==
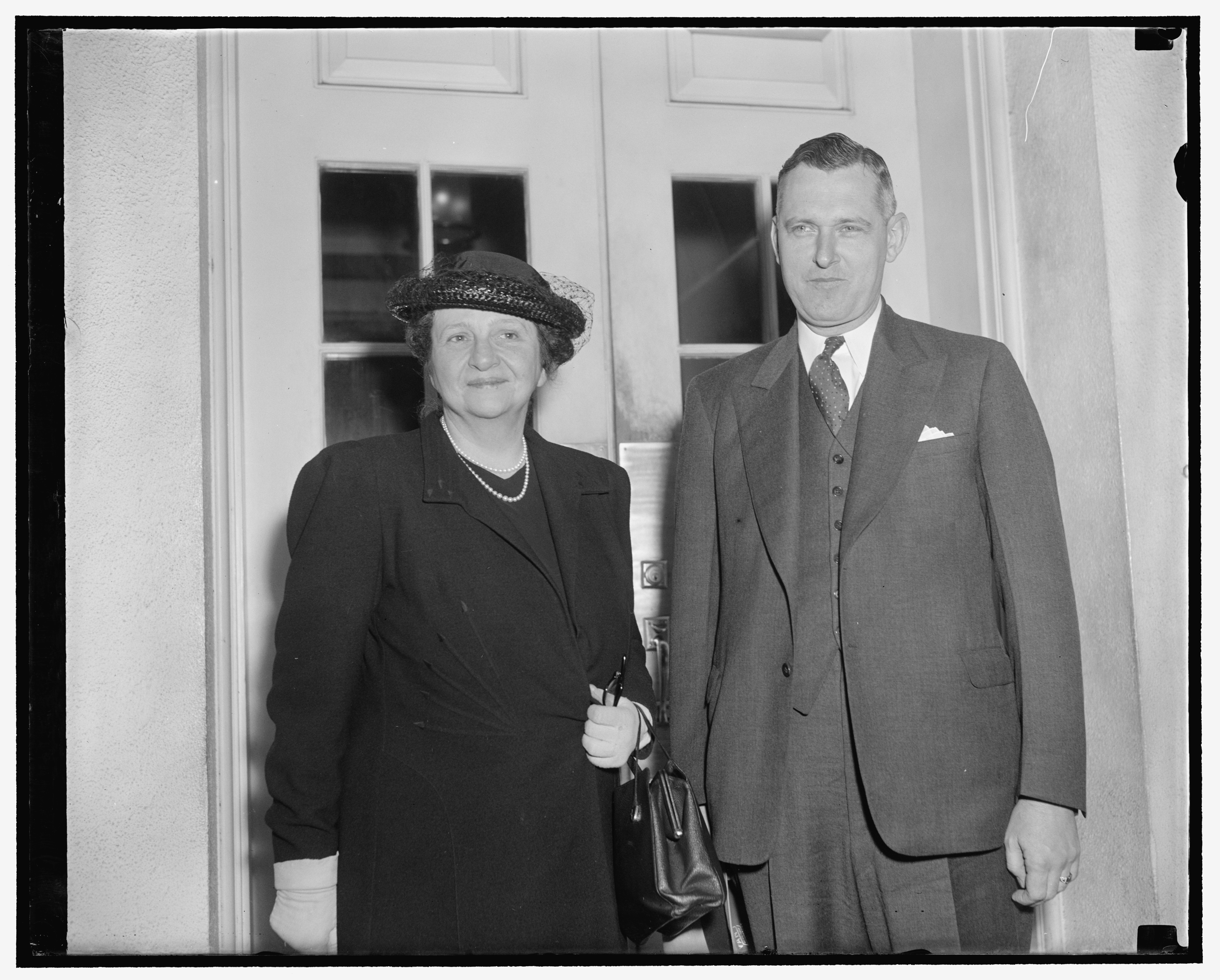
Steelman, Director of the U.S. Conciliation Service, and Labor Secretary Francis Perkins leave the White House after a meeting with President Franklin D. Roosevelt (1939)

After completing his Ph.D., Steelman embarked on a career in academia. He served as an instructor at Harvard University before becoming a professor of sociology at Alabama College. Frances Perkins, then Secretary of Labor, delivered the commencement address there in 1934. She met Steelman and admired his recent settlement of a labor dispute in Mobile, Alabama. Ken Hechler describes how impressed Perkins was with "the huge, open-faced, smiling man who taught economics but talked like a down-to-earth fellow...he seemed to know what he was talking about on all the labor issues that interested Secretary Perkins." She convinced him to join the federal government as a member of the United States Conciliation Service, a Labor Department agency that assisted in settling labor disputes. After three years he became Commissioner of Conciliation.

After President Franklin D. Roosevelt was elected to a fourth term, Steelman worked for a short time in New York City as a public relations consultant. But when Roosevelt died in 1945 and Vice President Harry Truman became president, Steelman returned to the federal government as an adviser to the Secretary of Labor. Later he became a special assistant to the President, serving as Director of the Office of War Mobilization and Reconversion. In 1946, he became "The Assistant to the President." In 1948, he turned down the post of Secretary of Labor, preferring to stay at the White House, where he was particularly focused on establishing policies on science and higher education.

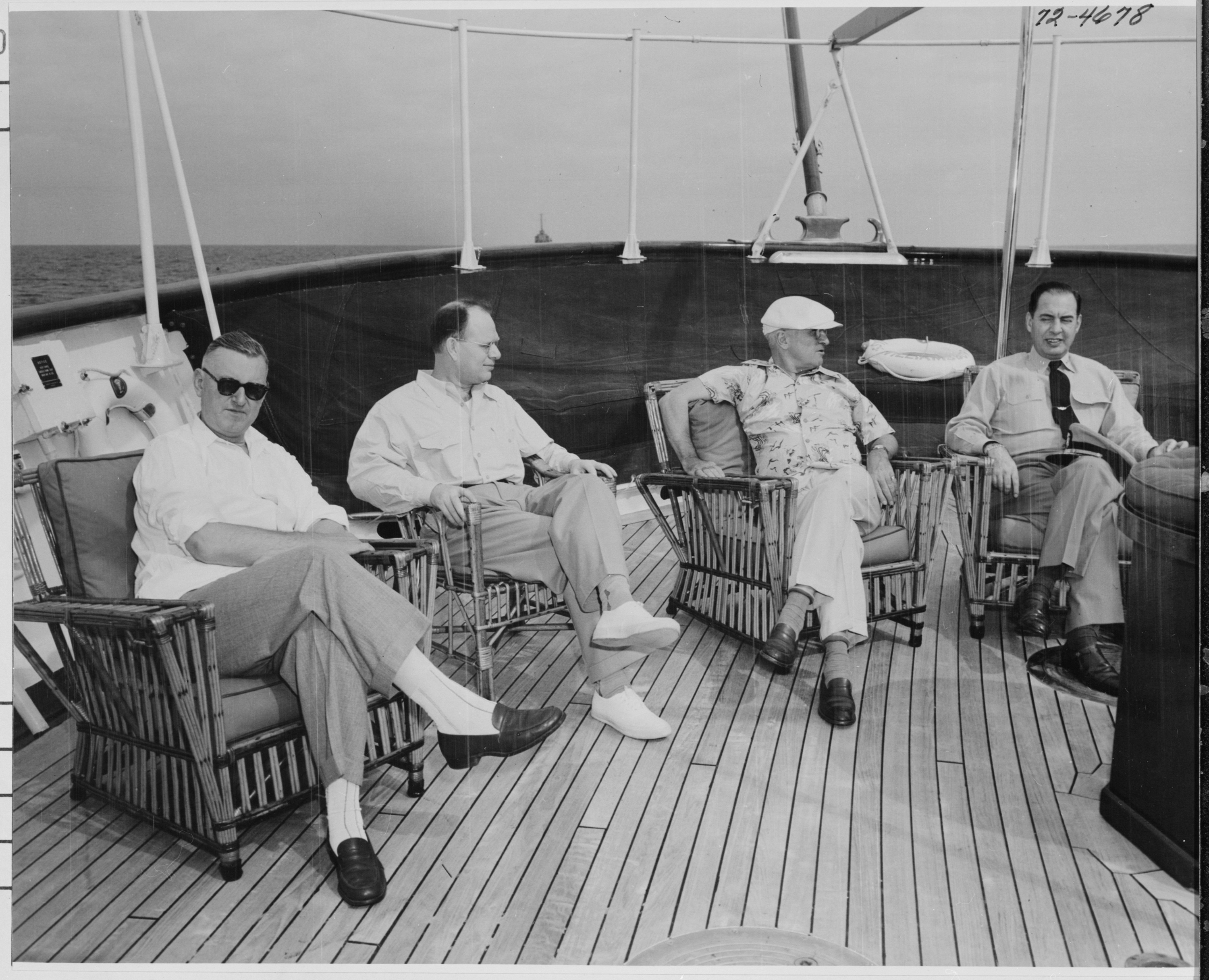
Steelman (left) in 1950 on board Harry Truman's yacht.

Before joining the White House, Steelman served as:

- Commissioner of Conciliation, U.S. Conciliation Service, Department of Labor 1934–36
- Special Assistant to the Secretary of Labor 1936–1937
- Director, U.S. Conciliation Service, Department of Labor 1937–1944
- Special Assistant to the President, 1945–1946
- Director, Office of War Mobilization and Reconversion, 1946
- Chairman, President's Scientific Research Board, 1946–1947
- Assistant to the President, 1946–1953
- Acting Chairman, National Security Resources Board, 1948–1950
- Acting Director, Office of Defense Mobilization, 1952

After leaving the White House, Steelman became an Industrial Relations Consultant in Washington, D.C., from 1953 to 1968. From 1955 to 1969 he served in a variety of corporate roles:

- President of the Montgomery Publishing Company
- Chairman of the Board of the Record Publishing Company
- Publisher of newspapers in Bethesda, Silver Spring, and Rockville, Maryland

== Personal life ==
Steelman's first marriage to Jean Mitchell and second marriage to Ruth Emma Zimmerman ended in divorce. When he died of natural causes in July 1999, in Naples, Florida, at the age of 99, he was survived by his wife of 38 years, Ellen Brown Steelman.

Political offices
New office	White House Chief of Staff; 1946–1953	Succeeded by Sherman Adams
Preceded by Charles Wilson	Director of the Office of Defense Mobilization; Acting; 1952	Succeeded by Henry H. Fowler
