= Sarah K. Smith =

American illustrator and educator

Sarah Katherine Smith
- Born: 1878; Rio Vista, California
- Died: March 1971 (aged 92–93); Wheaton, Illinois
- Education: Wheaton Academy; Wheaton College; Art Institute of Chicago

Sarah Katherine Smith (1878–1956+) was an artist and educator known for her illustrations, etchings, prints, and paintings. For 25 years, she was the head of the art department at the Gulf Park College for Women (now part of the University of Southern Mississippi) in Long Beach, Mississippi.

== Personal life and education ==
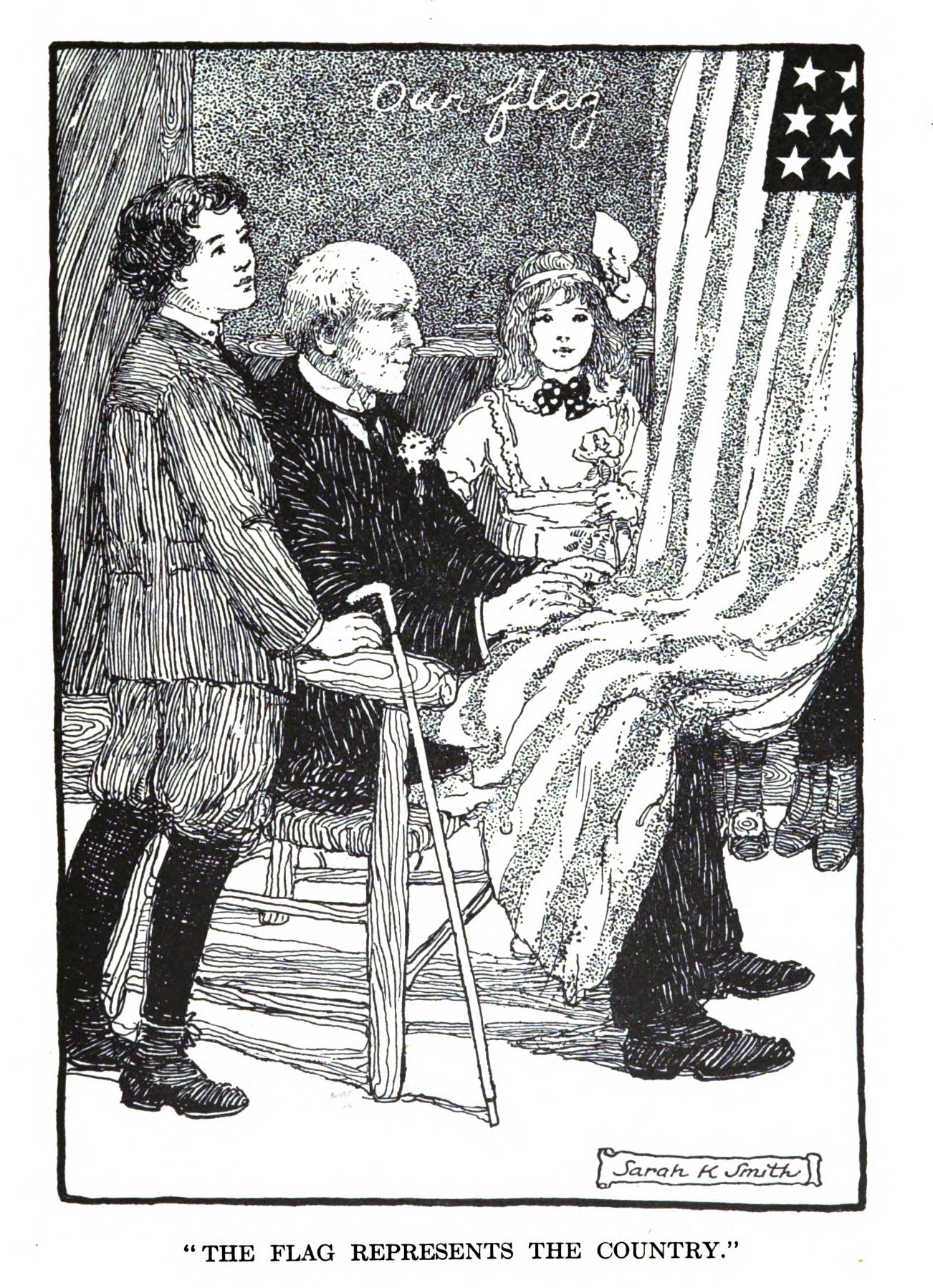
This Flag Represents Our Country, Sarah K. Smith, published in The Wide Awake Reader, 1913.

Sarah Katherine Smith was born in 1878 in Rio Vista, California. Her family moved to Wheaton, Illinois when she was young so that her father George H. Smith could become a professor of Latin and Greek at Wheaton College, where he taught from 1899 to 1936. Smith spent the majority of her early life in Wheaton, graduating from local Wheaton Academy high school in 1896. She soon enrolled in Wheaton College's art program, studying under the founder of the department, Mrs. S. H. Nutting. Smith graduated in 1900 and quickly moved to nearby Chicago to enroll in even higher education at the Art Institute of Chicago. While studying at the art institute, she also received artistic instruction from painter William Merritt Chase.

In the early 1900s, artist Howard Pyle opened the Howard Pyle School of Illustration Art at what are now the Howard Pyle Studios and the Frank E. Schoonover Studios in Wilmington, Delaware. The school admitted and released students on an individual, staggered schedule, so applicants never knew when they might be chosen. This led to the creation of an art colony of past and future students nearby, as many waited for their acceptance to the school, and Pyle held regular public lectures and workshops. Sarah K. Smith was never a full-time student of Howard Pyle, though she did temporarily move to Wilmington at the height of his popularity. She attended enough of his public classes to be considered a regular member of the group of non-student artists, alongside illustrators like Douglas Duer, Anton Otto Fischer, William Balfour Ker, Ernest Peixotto, Olive Rush, Remington Schuyler, Leslie Thrasher, and Edward A. Wilson. Years later in 1921, Smith financially contributed to the creation of Howard Pyle: A Record of His Illustrations and Writings, a 242-page collection published by the Wilmington Society of the Fine Arts.

Smith was living in Biloxi, Mississippi in 1927 when she became the vice president of a brand new arts organization known as the Gulf Coast Art Association. She was invited to serve as a juror alongside Will Henry Stevens for the art association's annual juried show that same year, with artist William Woodward receiving the gold medal. By 1938, Smith had been elected president of the organization. In addition to her involvement with the Gulf Coast Art Association, Smith was also an active member of the American Association of University Women.

Smith retired in 1946 after more than 40 years of creating art and working in education, choosing to leave Mississippi to return to her hometown of Wheaton, Illinois.

== Career ==
Sarah K. Smith began her career as an educator while she was still a student at the Art Institute of Chicago, serving as a teacher's assistant for the school's weekly Saturday sketch class. Smith returned to Wheaton after several years of study and travel and began working at Wheaton College, where she served as principal of the art department from 1905 until 1908. After leaving her position at Wheaton College, Smith spent several years traveling around New England meeting and learning from other artists. At the time of the First Annual Exhibition of Paintings by Pupils of Howard Pyle in 1912, she listed her town of residence as Boston, Massachusetts.

Smith spent the summer of 1928 traveling around Italy, completing many sketches and artworks along the way. She embarked on the journey to study the work of the old masters and collect materials and information to use in her future history of art classes.

=== Gulf Park College ===
Sarah Smith became the first head of the art department at the Gulf Park College for Women in 1921, a position she held until her retirement 25 years later in 1946. Ten years after her retirement, the college unveiled a newly constructed art building named in her honor. On April 24, 1956, the new building was unveiled and dedicated to Sarah K. Smith in a ceremony attended by many of her friends, former students, and colleagues. As she was living in Wheaton, Illinois and had completely lost her sight by this time, Smith herself could not return for the dedication ceremony. The Sarah K. Smith Art Studio stood at Gulf Park College for nearly six decades, next to the former art studio that had been designed by Smith herself. After the sale of Gulf Park College in 1971, the art studio building became part of the University of Southern Mississippi's Gulf Park campus. The Sara K. Smith Art Studio stood until the devastation of Hurricane Katrina resulted in the building's collapse in 2005.

Sarah died in Wheaton, Illinois, in 1971. She was 93 years old.

=== Exhibitions ===
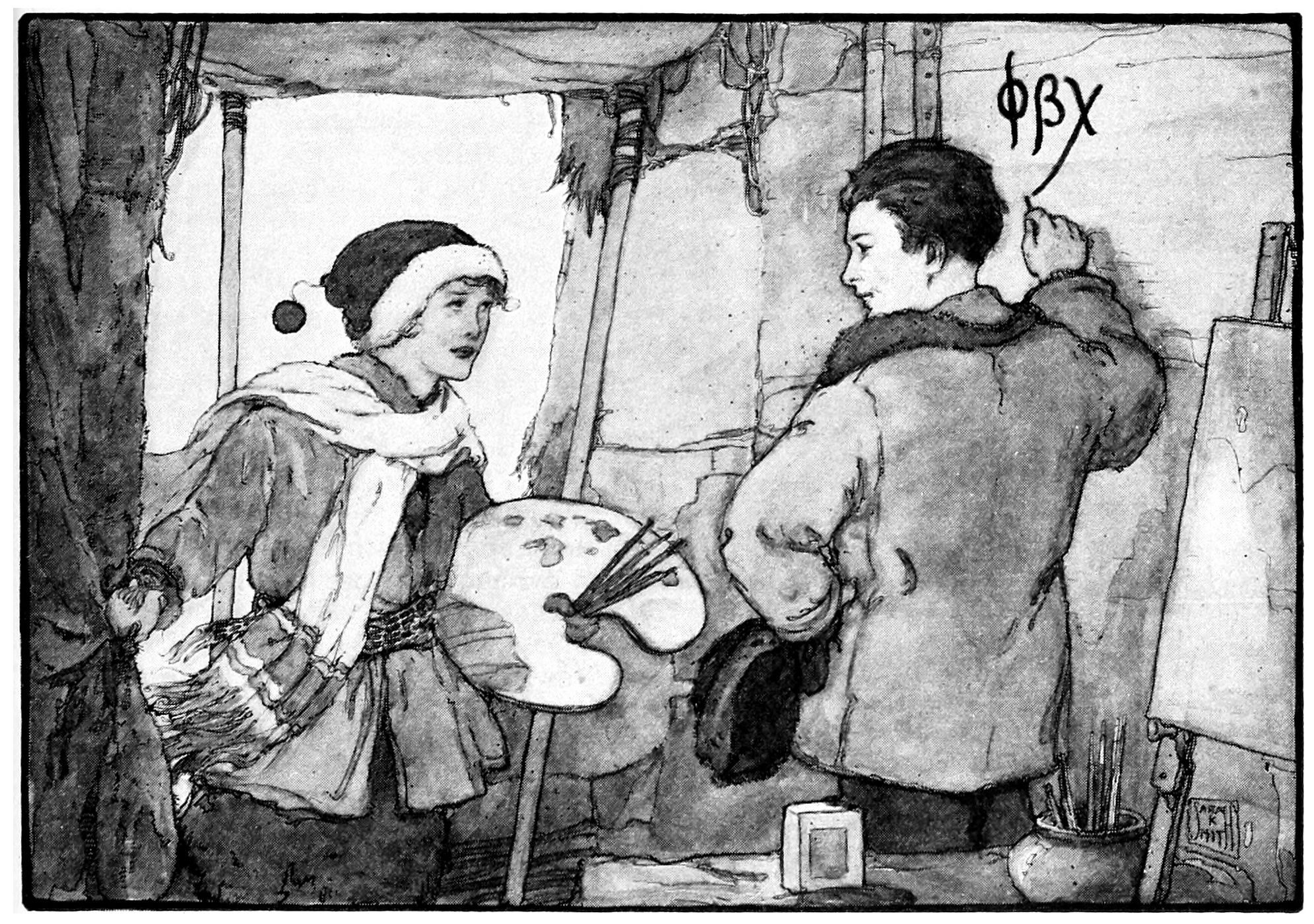
Drew With Charcoal, Sarah K. Smith, published in St. Nicholas, 1922.

Sarah K. Smith participated in several annual exhibitions of paintings by pupils of Howard Pyle in the 1910s sponsored by The Wilmington Society of the Fine Arts (now Delaware Art Museum), alongside artists like Gertrude Alice Kay, Katharine Pyle, Wuanita Smith, Frank Schoonover, and Jessie Wilcox Smith. Her work was also featured in art exhibitions held in association with the Southern States Art League, the Art Institute of Chicago, the New York Watercolor Club, the American Watercolor Society, and The Plastic Club.

In 1935, the Gulf Coast Art Association staged its annual art exhibition at the art studio managed by Sarah Smith at Gulf Park College. Ninety-five entries from sixteen member artists were featured in the exhibition, and Smith hosted more than 100 visitors during the show's opening reception. The annual exhibition returned to her studio again in 1937 for the show's 10th anniversary and again in 1940. The following is a small selection of exhibitions staged between 1910 and 1940 that are known to have included illustrations, paintings, prints, or engravings by Sarah K. Smith:

- The Plastic Club, Philadelphia, Pennsylvania, 1910.
- First Annual Exhibition of Paintings by Pupils of Howard Pyle, Delaware Art Museum, exhibited Decorative Panel, 1912.
- Second Annual Exhibition of Paintings by Pupils of Howard Pyle, Delaware Art Museum, exhibited Settignano, Where The World Passed By, and The Railto Bridge, 1913.
- Third Annual Exhibition of Paintings by Pupils of Howard Pyle, Delaware Art Museum, exhibited The Sentinel and Marie, 1914.
- Fifth Annual Exhibition of Paintings by Pupils of Howard Pyle, Delaware Art Museum, exhibited Florence, Virginia Asleep, and A Summer Afternoon, 1916.
- Sixth Annual Exhibition of Paintings by Pupils of Howard Pyle, Delaware Art Museum, exhibited Interior of Santa Croce, 1917.
- Exhibition of Art by Women of Mississippi, Biloxi Public Library, Biloxi, Mississippi, 1929.
- 10th Annual Exhibition of the Southern States Art League, New Orleans, Louisiana, exhibited The Old Pine Tree, 1930.
- 1930 Gulf Coast Art Association Art Show, Biloxi Public Library, Biloxi, Mississippi, awarded gold medal in watercolor, 1930.
- 1931 Gulf Coast Art Association Art Show, Biloxi Public Library, Biloxi, Mississippi, exhibited oil and watercolor paintings, 1931.
- 1935 Gulf Coast Art Association Art Show, Gulf Park College Art Studio, Long Beach, Mississippi, exhibited four paintings, 1935.
- 1937 Gulf Coast Art Association Art Show, Gulf Park College Art Studio, Long Beach, Mississippi,1937.
- 1940 Gulf Coast Art Association Art Show, Gulf Park College Art Studio, Long Beach, Mississippi, 1940.

== Works ==
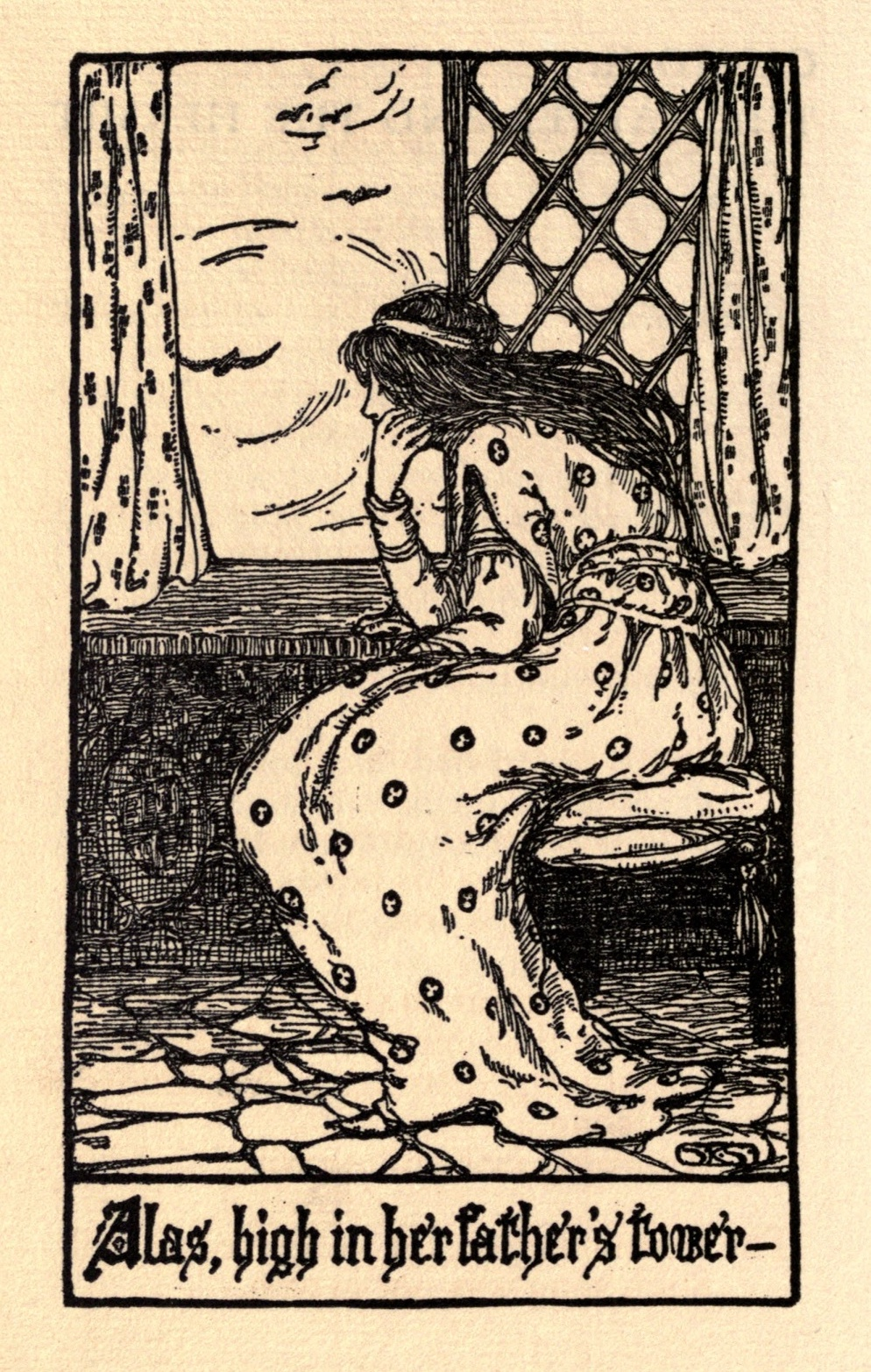
Alas, high in her father's tower..., Sarah K. Smith, published in The Harper & The King's Horse, 1905.

Sarah K. Smith typically created her illustrations via engraving and printmaking, though it was not uncommon for her to exhibit both watercolor and oil paintings. In addition to exhibiting her work extensively wherever she lived, her illustrations were regularly published in a variety of magazines and books. Only one of Smith's original artworks has come to public auction in recent decades: a small pastel drawing on board titled French Market was sold in 2019.

=== Illustrated books ===
Though she did not author any books herself, Smith is credited with the providing the illustrations for numerous children's books and textbooks written by authors like Caroline French Benton and Payne Erskine. The following is a list of books that contain illustrations by Sarah K. Smith:

- The Harper & The King's Horse by Payne Erskine, Blue Sky Press, 1905.
- A Mother's Year by Helen Russ Stough, Fleming H. Revell, 1909.
- Child Classics, The Second Reader by Georgia Alexander, Bobbs-Merrill Company, 1909.
- Child Classics, The Third Reader by Georgia Alexander, Bobbs-Merrill Company, 1909.
- The Wide Awake Fourth Reader by Clara Murray, Little, Brown & Company, 1913.
- The Fun of Cooking: A Story for Boys and Girls by Caroline French Benton, 1915.
- Knowledge Primer Games by Ida C. Miriam, Albert Whitman & Co., 1923.
- The Secret of The Clan, Alice Brown, Macmillan Publishers, 1924.
- The Love Cycle by Lulu Daniel Hardy, Richard G. Badger, 1924.

=== Publications ===
Sarah K. Smith regularly contributed both interior illustrations and cover artwork to magazines like St. Nicholas, Harper's Bizaar, Outlook, and The Youth's Companion. Most often, Smith illustrated short stories written by authors like Caroline French Benton and Roy J. Snell for publication in St. Nicholas children's magazine. In 1915, she illustrated a short story written by Josephine Scribner Gates for publication in St. Nicholas, which was subsequently added to numerous compendiums of holiday stories for children.

=== Collections ===
In the early 2000s, Wheaton College acquired the Sarah K. Smith Collection which contains several pieces of her artwork and a journal from her 1928 travels in Europe. The Delaware Art Museum Archives holds numerous sketches by Smith, and items related to her study are included in the museum's large collection of Howard Pyle student files.

- Sarah K. Smith Collection, Buswell Library Special Collections, Wheaton College, Wheaton, Illinois.
- Numerous books illustrated by Sarah K. Smith, M. G. Sawyer Collection of Decorative Bindings, Delaware Art Museum Library, Wilmington, Delaware.
- Students of Howard Pyle files, Delaware Art Museum Archives, Wilmington, Delaware.
