= Sigsbee =

Sigsbee may refer to

- Charles Dwight Sigsbee, a Rear Admiral in the United States Navy
- Sigsbee (skipjack), listed on the National Register of Historic Places in Maryland
- Sigsbee, Missouri, an unincorporated community
- USS Sigsbee (DD-502), a former Fletcher-class destroyer
