= Missouri supplemental route =

Secondary highway system in Missouri

Missouri Supplemental Route System
- Highway markers for Routes A and BB

System information
- Formed: 1952
- State: Route xx

System links
- Missouri State Highway System; Interstate; US; State; Supplemental

A supplemental route is a state secondary road in the U.S. state of Missouri, designated with letters. Supplemental routes were various roads within the state that the Missouri Department of Transportation was given in 1952 to maintain in addition to the regular routes, though lettered routes had been in use from at least 1932. The four types of roads designated as Routes are:

- Farm to market roads
- Roads to state parks
- Former alignments of U.S. or state highways
- Short routes connecting state highways from other states to routes in Missouri

Supplemental routes make up 19,064 miles (30,681 km) (59%) of the state highway system.

== History ==
Prior to 1907, all road improvement activities in Missouri were undertaken by the individual counties, with little expertise or coordination between them. Amid growing automobile presence and insufficient road networks in Missouri in the ensuing years, the state legislature created a state highway department and the state highway commission as well as enacted various laws aimed at improving transportation in the state. In 1920, recognizing that economic prosperity and growth are highly related to good transportation, the legislature passed a $60 million bond issue for road work. This effort, along with the Centennial Road Law passed by the legislature in 1921, shifted highway building efforts in Missouri from the local level to the state level. As a result, the state highway commission undertook an aggressive road building campaign throughout the 1920s and 1930s aimed to get Missouri "out of the mud".

In 1952, the state highway department embarked on its Missouri 10-Year Highway Modernization and Expansion Program. Through this effort, the state assumed maintenance responsibility of over an additional 12,000 miles (19,000 km) of secondary and farm-to-market roads previously managed by the counties. The goal of the secondary highway system was to place state-maintained roads within 2 miles (3.2 km) of more than 95% of all rural farm houses, schools, churches, cemeteries and stores. Most of Missouri's lettered supplemental highways are the result of this program.

== Highway designations ==
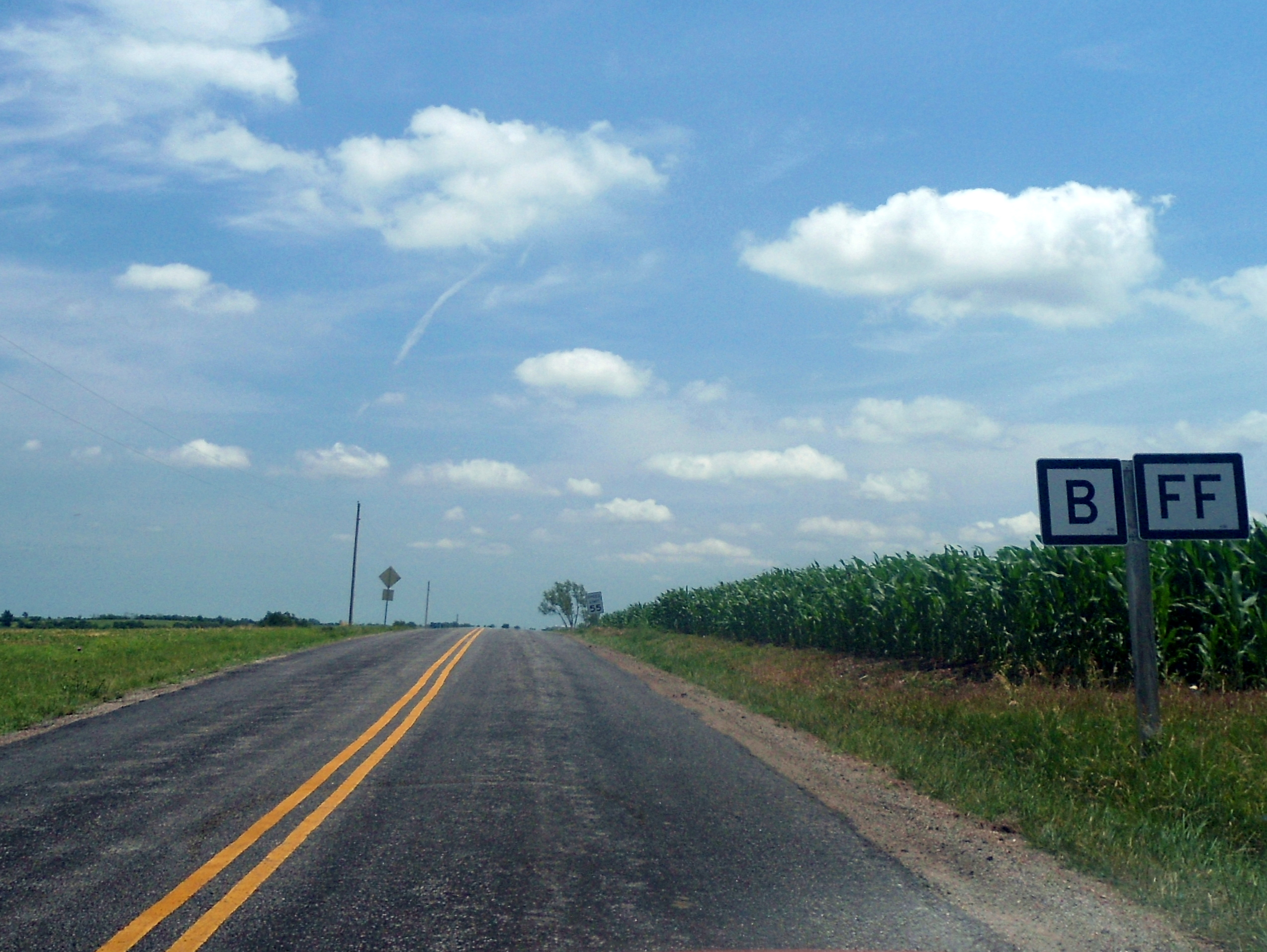
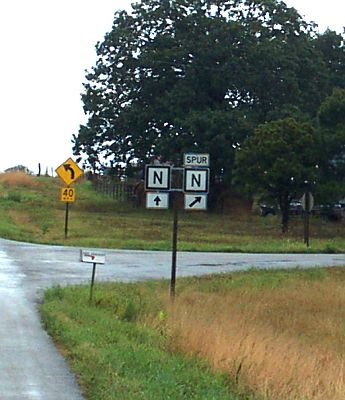
Top: Missouri Supplemental Routes B and FF concur in Nodaway County. Bottom: Spur Route N detaches from its parent route in Cedar County.

The more major supplemental routes of the system are assigned single-letter designations (such as "K"). Minor branch routes and farm-to-market roads, which often end at county roads or are former alignments of the other highways, are typically assigned two-letter designations consisting of two of the same letters (e.g. "KK"). Additionally, combinations of letters may be used, but always with A as the first letter (such as "AD"); the only exceptions to this are Route BA in western St. Louis County and combinations beginning with the letter R, which are used for routes that connect with state parks or other recreational facilities, which is the only use of R on the system. Route AR, south of Bakersfield, is the only non-recreational route with an R in it.

The vast majority of the highways in the system are designated with 19 letters of the alphabet. The letters "G", "I", "L", "Q", and "S" are not used because of the potential confusion with other letters and numbers. The only use of X is on Route AX in Macon County. The most common designation is "F" (79 different routes); the most common double letter designation is "BB" (74 different routes). Routes AP, AR, AT, AU, AV, AW, AX, AY, AZ, and BA each have a single route with that designation.

Supplemental routes rarely run for more than a few miles, although they may cross county lines. A route's designation may sometime change when crossing at a U.S. Route or Interstate highway. Designations are also reused, but not usually in the same county but can connect to another county with the same letter. In some cases, supplemental routes will share a concurrency with a state route or another supplemental route.

== Signage ==
Supplemental routes are signed by black letters on a white background with a black border. Rarely, the markers will be marked with auxiliary plates such as a cardinal direction or end plate. There are no business or bypass routes for the roads; however, seven examples exist of spur routes: Spur Route N in Cedar County, Spur Route C in Gentry County, Spur Route C (to Union Covered Bridge State Historic Site) in Monroe County, Spur Route K (into East Lynne) in Cass County, Spur Route J (to Sigsbee) in Shelby County, Spur Route V in Butler County, and Spur Route Y in Montgomery County. Then, one connector route: Connector Route M in Jefferson County.

It is erroneously believed that because these roads are designated by letters rather than numbers and they exist in more than one county that these roads are county roads, not state highways, with some businesses and residences located on these roads saying their address is "County Road …". This may have also arisen from the signage used prior to the early 1960s, where the letter was painted black against a white background, with the words "STATE ROAD" above the letter and the county name (in all capital letters) below the letter, or from the use of letters representing county trunk routes in Wisconsin.

== See also ==
- Special route
