= Montrepose Cemetery =

Cemetery in Ulster County, New York state

Coordinates: 41°55′05″N 73°59′52″W

Montrepose Cemetery is a burial ground in Kingston, New York, United States.

It is also host to the Agudas Achim Congregation Cemetery.

== Burials ==
- Maryanne Amacher (1938–2009), composer
- Thomas Cornell (1814–1890), politician and businessman
- Mary Sigsbee Fischer (1876–1960) and Anton Otto Fischer (1882–1962), artists
- Arthur Sherwood Flemming (1905–1996), US Secretary of Health, Education, and Welfare
- Walter B. Gibson (1897–1985), author and magician
- James Girard Lindsley (1819–1898), US Congressman
- Jervis McEntee (1828–1891), painter
- Francis Luis Mora (1874–1940), artist
- Calvert Vaux (1824–1895), architect
- Jeneverah M. Winton (1837–1904), American author, poet
- Robert Lee Howard (1888–1945), Rondout Light House Keeper
