= USC&GS Carlile P. Patterson =

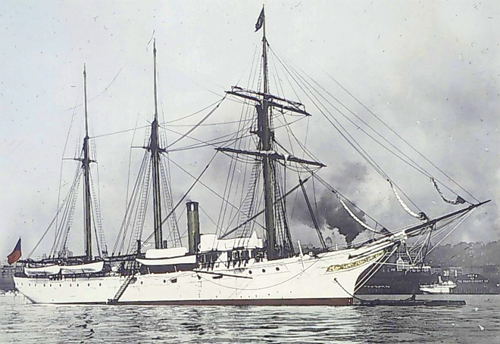
- USC&GS Carlile P. Patterson

History

United States
- Name: USC&GS Carlile P. Patterson
- Namesake: Carlile P. Patterson (1816–1881), Superintendent of the United States Coast and Geodetic Survey
- Owner: United States Coast and Geodetic Survey (1883–1918); United States Navy (1918–1919); Washington Tug and Barge Co.; C.K. West Co. (1924–1925); Northern Whaling and Trading Company (1925–1937); Alaska Patterson Co. (1937–1938)
- Ordered: 1883
- Builder: James D. Leary, Brooklyn, New York
- Cost: $100,000
- Launched: January 15, 1884
- Sponsored by: Miss Katie Patterson, daughter of the late Capt. Carlile P. Patterson
- Commissioned: April 1, 1884
- Recommissioned: 1918 (United States Navy)
- Decommissioned: 1919
- In service: 1884–1919, 1924–1938
- Out of service: 1919–1924 (?)
- Renamed: Forward, August 15, 1918; Patterson 1924 or earlier
- Fate: Wrecked, 1938

General characteristics
- Type: Survey ship
- Tonnage: 604
- Displacement: 719
- Length: 163 ft (49.7 m)
- Beam: 27.4 ft (8.4 m)
- Draft: 14.2 ft (4.3 m)
- Depth of hold: 10.3 ft (3.1 m)
- Decks: 2
- Deck clearance: 7 ft (2.1 m) upper deck
- Installed power: Cross compound vertical steam engine, cylinders 17 and 31 inches × 28 inch stroke, 215 ihp; replaced by 325 hp diesel 1924
- Propulsion: 8 ft screw
- Sail plan: Barkentine
- Speed: 7–9 knots (13–17 km/h; 8.1–10.4 mph) (steam)
- Boats & landing craft carried: 7
- Crew: 12–13 officers, 40–46 crewmen
- Armament: Gatling guns; 2 × 6-pounder guns during naval service

USC&GS Carlile P. Patterson was a survey ship of the United States Coast and Geodetic Survey in operation between 1883 and 1918. Subsequently, she had a brief period of naval service and fifteen seasons as a merchant vessel before she was wrecked on the Alaska coast in 1938.

== Construction ==
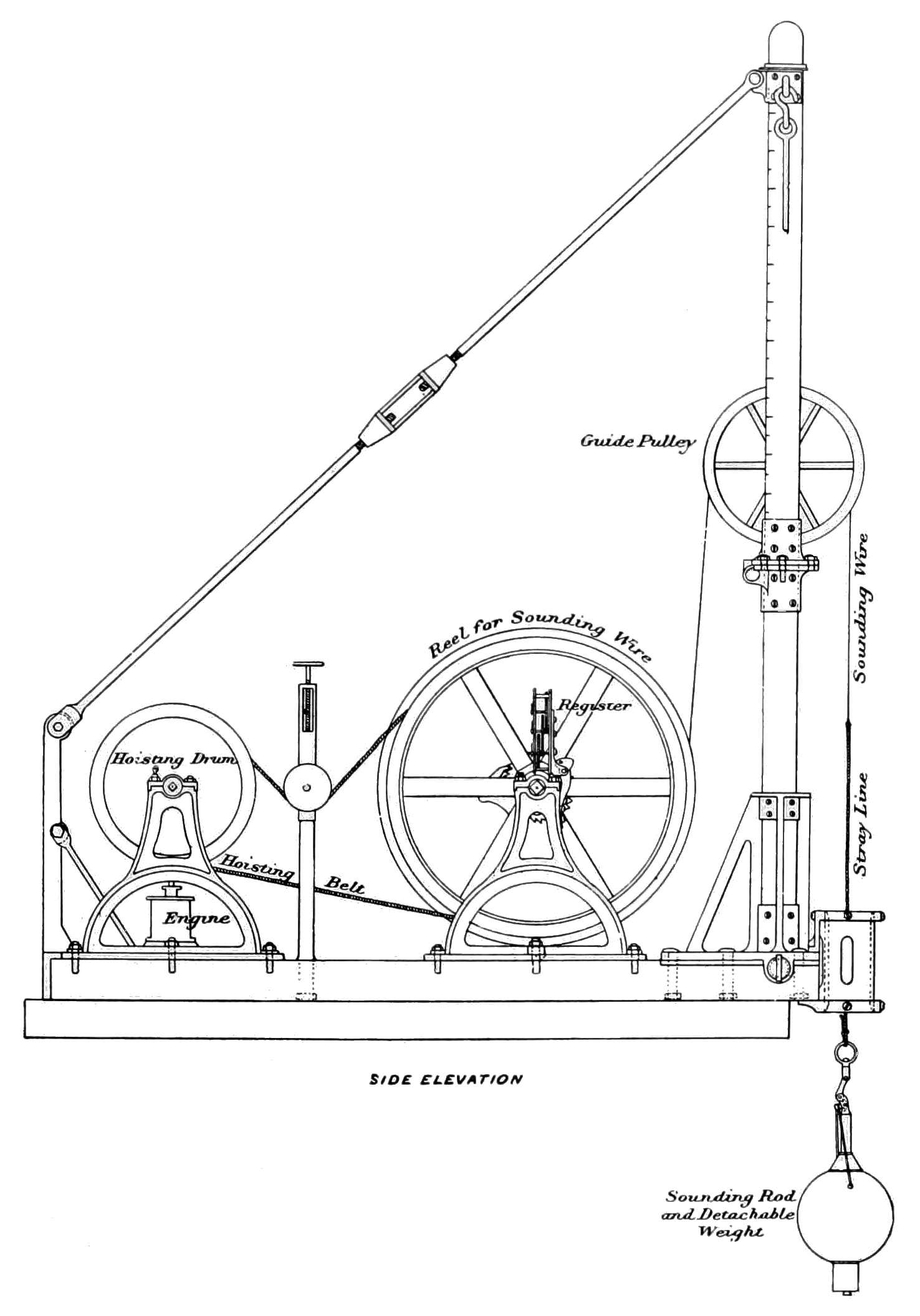
The Sigsbee sounding machine

Carlile P. Patterson was named for Carlile Pollock Patterson, fourth Superintendent of the Coast Survey and first of the Coast and Geodetic Survey. The New York Times credited the design to Commander Colby Mitchell Chester, USN, at that time Hydrographic Inspector in USC&GS. Naval architect Samuel Hartt Pook, U.S. Naval Constructor, was credited with supervising the drawings. She was built of wood in James D. Leary's yard at Williamsburg (Brooklyn) New York. Frames were white oak with cedar tops; planking, beams and lower deck were yellow pine, the upper deck was white pine. Her hull was fitted with iron diagonal braces, and five watertight bulkheads (three wood, two iron). Power was a cross compound vertical steam engine (one source reports 356 hp, 265 kW, another source says 215 ihp, 160 kW; this difference may represent different calculation or measurement methods) and she could carry 133 tons of coal as fuel. Her machinery was constructed by Neafie & Levy of Philadelphia. She was rigged as a barkentine with double topsail yards; standing rigging was galvanized charcoal-iron wire. Her boats were two steam launches, two cutters, two whaleboats, and a dinghy. Her deckhouse, 13 ft × 62 ft (4.0 m × 18.9 m), included the engine and boiler rooms, galley, pantry, and a drafting room. She carried a Sigsbee piano-wire sounding machine, state-of-the-art for deep-water hydrography, holding five miles of wire. Lieutenant Richardson Clover, USN, supervised construction and became her first commander.

== Federal career ==
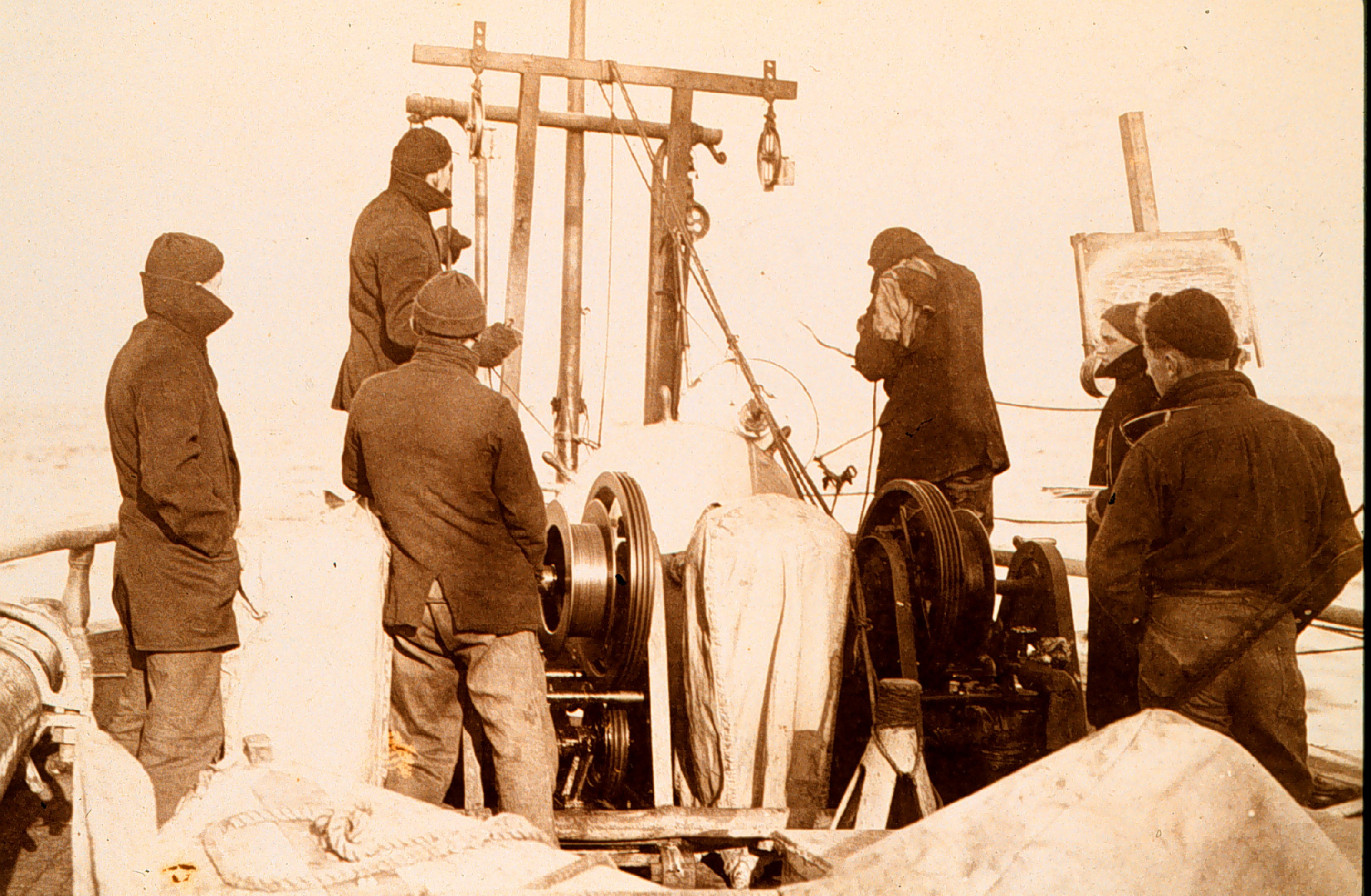
Sounding operations on Carlile P. Patterson, 1913

Carlile P. Patterson departed Hampton Roads for the west coast on July 30, 1884. She traveled by way of the Straits of Magellan, with stops at Madeira, Rio de Janeiro, Montevideo, Punta Arenas, Valparaíso, Callao, Panama, San Diego, and Santa Barbara. She arrived at San Francisco February 13, 1885, and immediately began preparations for her first season of surveying. She left for Sitka April 26 and began survey work May 27.

Carlile P. Patterson was primarily used as a survey vessel off the coast of Alaska and numerous Alaskan features were named by the assorted crews of the steamer. She also served in other west-coast locations and in the Hawaiian Islands. On November 2, 1899, she was damaged when hit by the ferry City of Seattle while at anchor, receiving $1,200 in damage. In 1914, she found and rescued 26 members of the crew of USRC Tahoma after that ship struck an uncharted reef in the Aleutians and sank.

In 1918, Carlile P. Patterson was transferred to the United States Navy for use as a patrol ship during the last months of World War I. She was renamed Forward on August 15, 1918, and performed both patrol and hydrographic duties in Alaska and off the Mexican coast. Subsequently, she was returned to the Coast and Geodetic Survey in 1919. The Survey judged she was no longer strong enough for offshore use, and too slow for cost-effective hydrographic work, so she was sold. She was out of service several years.

== Merchant career ==
In 1924, the Washington Tug and Barge Co. sold Carlile P. Patterson to C.K. West Co. of Portland Oregon who converted her to a motorship for operation along the Oregon coast; the steam engine was replaced with a diesel, probably the four-cylinder Bolinder engine she had in 1930. It was probably at this time or a year later that she underwent a substantial rebuilding. Her deckhouse, bowsprit and eventually also her mizzenmast were removed, her bow was reshaped, and the fore and main masts were replaced with, or reduced to, pole masts. A stern deckhouse and superstructure were constructed. These changes are evident in the photos of the 1938 shipwreck (this article and external links) and in a 1930 photo taken at Herschel Island.

In 1925, Patterson was purchased by the Northern Whaling and Trading Company. From then through 1936 she operated as an Arctic trading ship under Captain Christian Theodore Pedersen, operating between San Francisco and Herschel Island with stops along the Alaska coast. Subsequently, she was sold to the Alaska Patterson Co. which operated her for freight service.

== Shipwreck ==
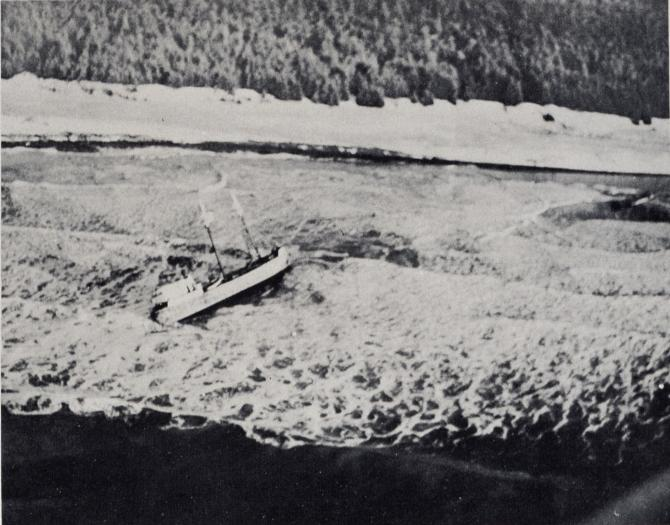
MS Patterson wrecked at Cape Fairweather, Alaska

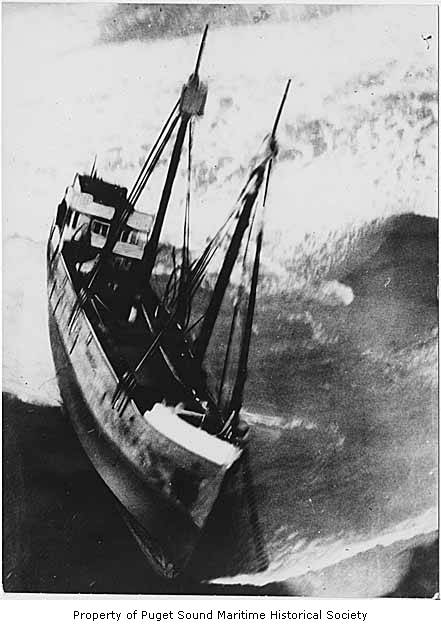
Close aerial view of the wreck

Patterson was wrecked December 11, 1938, going ashore in surf and blinding rain 8 miles (13 km) northwest of Cape Fairweather in the Gulf of Alaska, near the mouth of Sea Otter Creek. She was en route from Kodiak to Seattle when she went aground. The first mate was washed overboard and lost trying to launch a lifeboat and a crewman drowned in the swollen creek while attempting to rig a lifeline to get the crew to shore. The 18 survivors remained in the vessel until the tide went out, then reached the beach where they subsisted on supplies dropped from airplanes. Two men were flown out by Alaska pilot Sheldon Simmons who made a daring float plane landing in the creek. The remaining men hiked out to Lituya Bay with a guide, Nels Ludwinson, left by Simmons's plane. Ludwinson was a local trapper who had been jailed for drunkenness and let out early for the job. These man were picked up by Navy planes and the Coast Guard cutter Haida.

Most of the cargo was salvaged by barge the next spring. Patterson was reportedly beaten to pieces by the surf.
