= Jeneverah M. Winton =

American poet

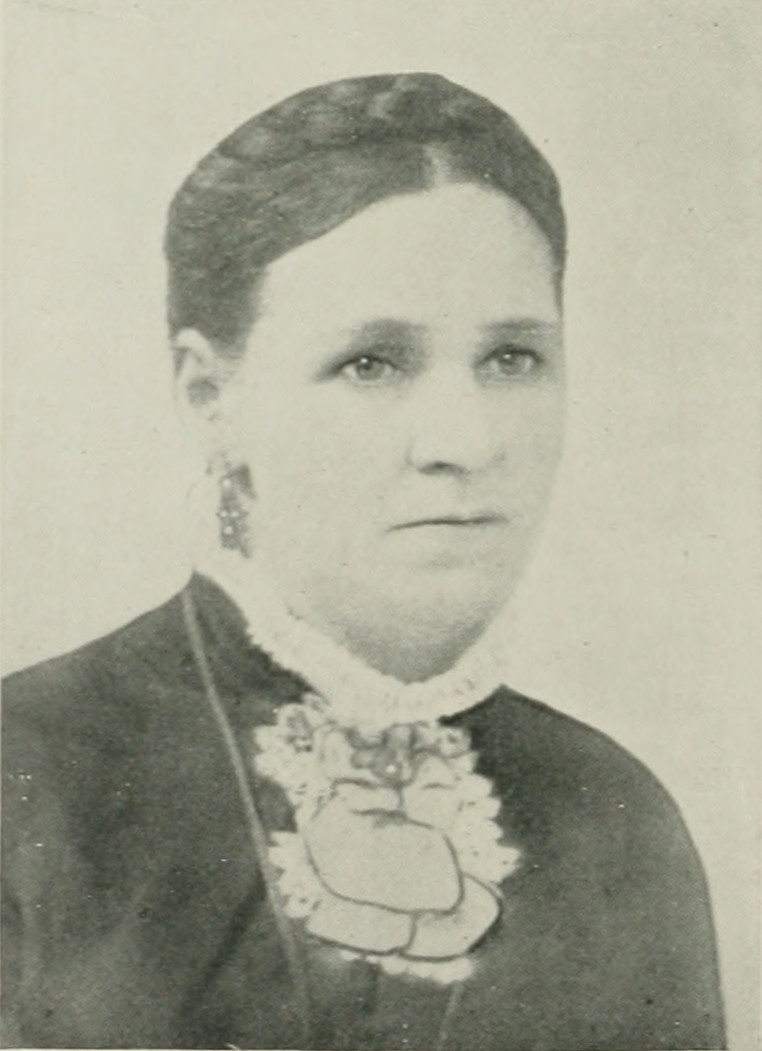
- Photo in A Woman of the Century
- Born: Jeneverah(?)/Jenevehah(?)/Geneverah(?) Maria Pray; May 11, 1837; Orrville, New York, U.S.
- Died: April 12, 1904 (aged 66); Rochester, New York, U.S.
- Resting place: Montrepose Cemetery, Kingston, New York, U.S.
- Occupations: author, poet, lyricist
- Spouses: Eli Peelor (m. ?); William H. Winton (m. 1874)
- Children: 3
- Writing career
- Pen name: Mrs. J. M. Winton; several, unknown
- Language: English

Jeneverah M. Winton (née, Pray; pen name, Mrs. J. M. Winton; May 11, 1837 – April 12, 1904) was an American poet and author. Many of her poems were set to music by Hart Pease Danks, Thomas Westendorf, and others. In addition to signing her works as "Geneverah M. Winton", "Jeneverah M. Winton" and "Mrs. J. M. Winton", she used several unknown pen names.

== Early life and education ==
Jeneverah (alternately, "Jenevehah" or "Geneverah") Maria Pray was born in Orrville, New York, May 11, 1837. (Note: According to familycentral.net, Geneverah Maria Pray was born in Rochester, New York.)

She was the daughter of George Wesley and Elizabeth Burton Pray. She belonged to a family with many branches throughout the United States. Three brothers of her father's ancestry came from France with Lafayette and joined the American forces. One of these gave his means and ships, another became an officer in the Continental Army, and the third gave his life for the American cause. Her father, a native of Rhode Island, was educated in Oxford University, England, and became a preacher. Her mother, the daughter of an English earl and otherwise related to some of England's nobility, was very highly educated and wrote considerable prose and poetry, some of which was published in book form, under a pen name. Her siblings were: Mary (b. ca. 1813), Nathan (1815-1860), Orman (b. 1818), Elizabeth (1823-1882), Miles (1824-1892), George (1827-1891), Lydia (1835-1898), and Byron (1837-1837).

Winton began to write early in life, and while attending Lima Seminary, Lima, New York, wrote much poetry.

== Career ==
Many of Winton's poems were printed and copied extensively, under some pen name or unsigned, in magazines and other periodicals. In her younger years, she wrote much and was paid well. Being then in affluent circumstances, it was her custom to give what she earned to the poor and less fortunate.

While living in Indianapolis, Indiana, and other cities of the West, her productions were identified and copied in various parts of the U.S. Many of her original poems were set to music by Thomas Westendorf and others. For several years, her residence was in Rochester, New York and Kingston, New York, where, up to the time of the death of her daughter, her manuscripts were given to the press. Since that event, which nearly killed Winton, too, few literary productions were sent out.

== Personal life ==
She married, firstly, Eli Peelor (1832-?). They had three children: Emma Peelor (1855-?), Estella Peelor (1859-?), and Mary Peelor (1862-1882). On May 23, 1874, she married, secondly, William H. Winton (?-1923).

For nearly two years, to escape the hardship associated with a northern climate, she resided in southern New Jersey, among the rustic surroundings of her farm on Landis avenue, East Vineland. Later, she resided in New Haven, Connecticut.

In 1899, she was involved in a land transfer by John H. Bailey to her, involving property on Melville park in Rochester, New York.

For years, Winton was president of the Women's Missionary Society of the East Side Presbyterian Church, and she was an active member of the Presbyterian church nearly all her life. Earlier in life, she was a member of the Methodist Episcopal Church.

Jeneverah Winton died at the family home in Rochester, New York, April 12, 1904. She was survived by her husband, and was buried Kingston, New York, in the Montrepose Cemetery.

== Selected works ==
=== Poetry ===
- "At the Last"
- "Better Than Gold"
- "Charity"
- "The Children's Gift"
- "The Door to Memory's Hall"
- "Even-Tide"
- "Human Life"
- "If"
- "If I Should Die To-Night"
- "Over the River"
- "We are Changing"
- "Will the New Year Come To-Night Mama?"

=== Songs ===
- "The Bride" (H. P. Danks, H. P., composer; Mrs. J. M. Winton, lyricist; 1880)
- "Write to me often darling" (Thomas Payne Westendorf, composer; Mrs. J. M. Winton, lyricist; 1878)
- "Sweet mem'ries of my childhood : song with chorus" (Thomas P. Westendorf, composer; J. M. Winton, lyricist; 1878)
