= William Balfour Ker =

Canadian-American artist (1877–1918)

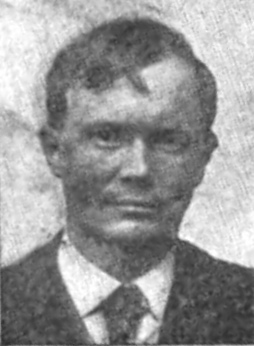
- Ker (c. 1911)
- Born: July 25, 1877; Dunnville, Ontario, Canada
- Died: October 20, 1918 (aged 41); New York City, New York, U.S.
- Resting place: Rock Creek Cemetery; Washington, D.C., U.S.
- Occupation: Illustrator, painter, artist
- Spouse(s): Mary Ellen Sigsbee
- Relatives: Tuesday Weld (granddaughter)

William Balfour Ker (July 25, 1877 – October 20, 1918) also known simply as Balfour Ker, and sometimes written Balfour-Ker was a Canadian-American artist whose paintings appeared in popular magazines such as Life and The Delineator, and were widely reproduced in postcards and posters. A declared socialist, some of his most popular work depicts issues of class struggle and poverty. His work also appeared in advertisements for Liberty bonds and war savings stamps during World War I.

== Early life ==
William Balfour Ker was born in Dunnville, Ontario, Canada on July 25, 1877. (Note: Some modern sources such as the Union List of Artist Names list his birth place as Dunville, Newfoundland and Labrador, yet Ker himself stated in a 1911 interview: "I was born in an Imperial Bank of Canada at Dunville, [sic] Ontario, July 25, 1877.") He had Scottish ancestry. His mother, Lily Florence Bell Ker, was first cousin of the inventor Alexander Graham Bell, and his father, William Ker, was a Scottish businessman and banker. The family moved to the United States in 1880, where Ker was later naturalised. He had two brothers who survived him. Ker was raised in North Yakima, Washington, and at age 18 studied law at George Washington University and began attending evening classes in illustration. The Yakima Herald reported that by February 1896 he was a reporter for the Washington, D. C. Daily Post, and by December 1896 was studying art in Paris. He ended up as an artist in New York City.

== Career ==
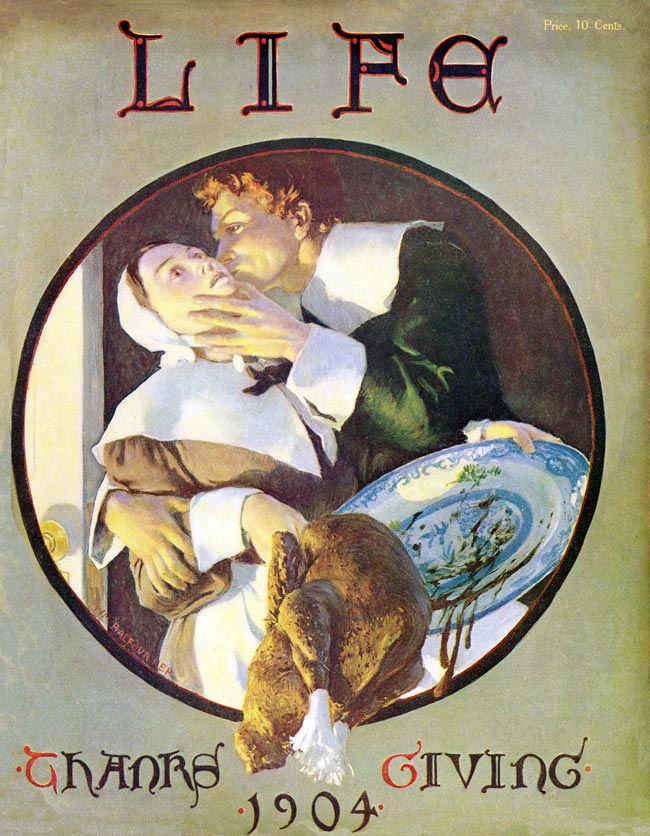
Balfour Ker's cover for Life, Thanksgiving 1904

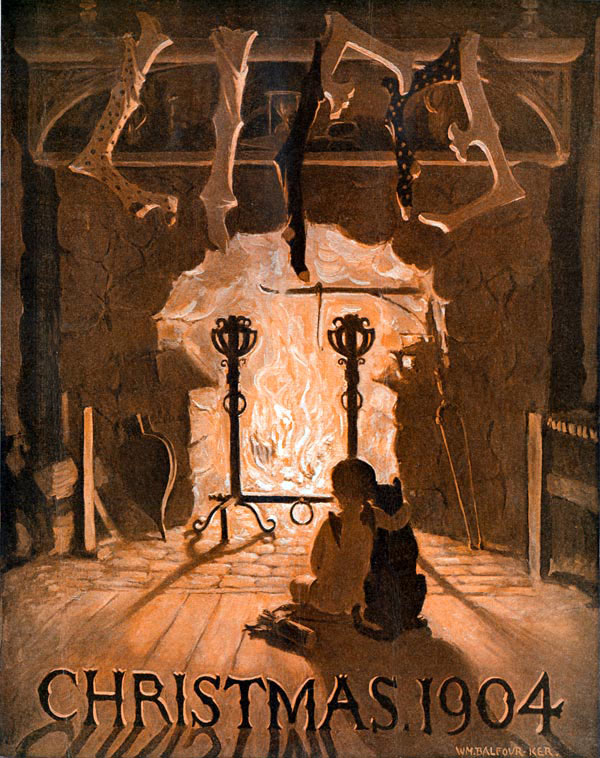
Christmas 1904 cover for Life

Ker painted covers for Life magazine, including Thanksgiving and Christmas issues. Some of his illustrations for Life were published as postcards by the Detroit Publishing Company.

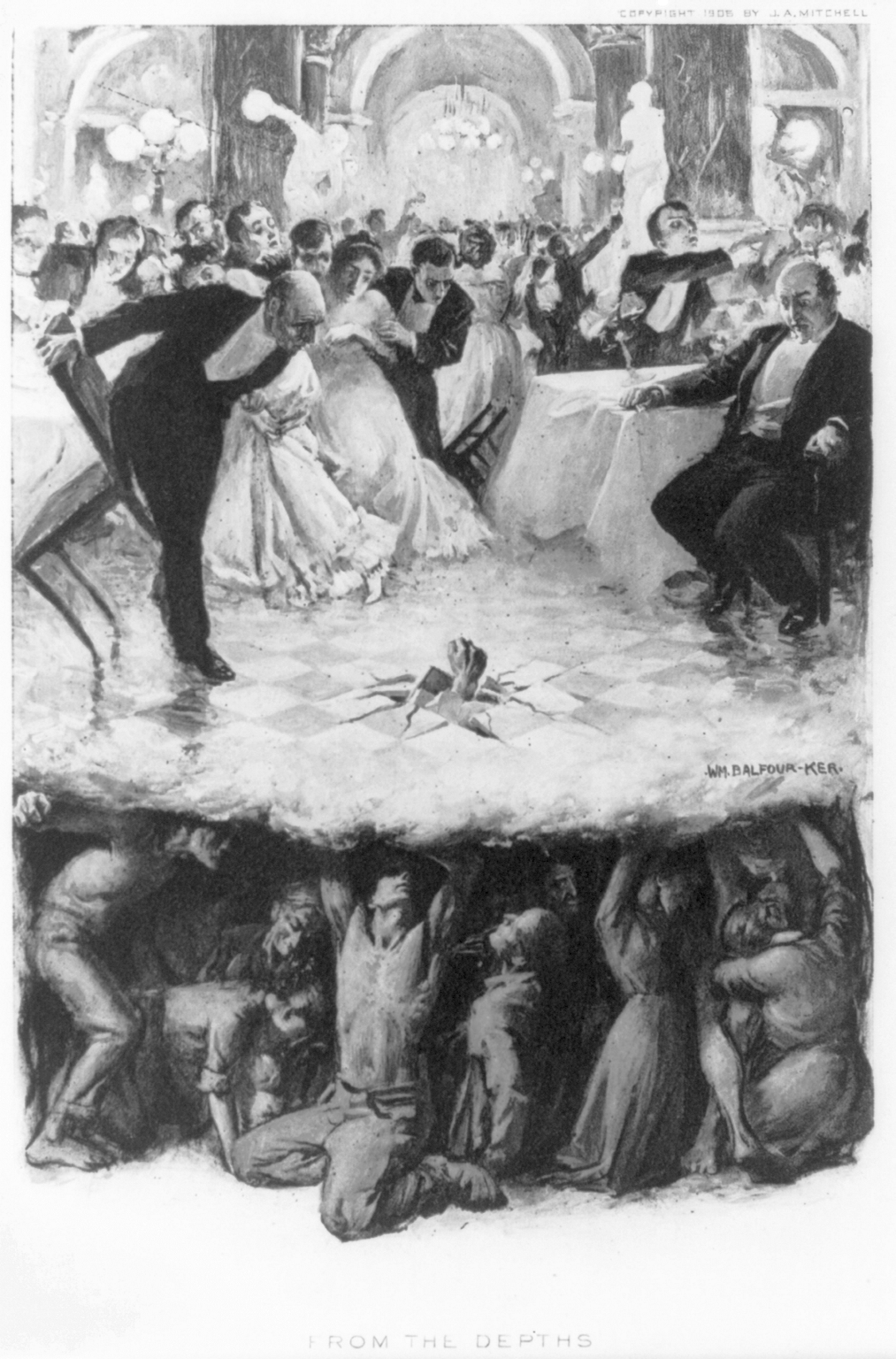
From the depths (circa 1906) "a lavish social event in a large ballroom attended by the well-to-do; the party is disrupted when a fist erupts through the floor, beneath which are the struggling masses of the less fortunate who provide the foundation support on which the wealthy rest."

His political commitment to socialism was often reflected in his art. His most notable, widely printed and reproduced piece From the Depths was originally published in the 1906 book The Silent War by John Ames Mitchell. According to the LoC, it depicts:

a lavish social event in a large ballroom attended by the well-to-do; the party is disrupted when a fist erupts through the floor, beneath which are the struggling masses of the less fortunate who provide the foundation support on which the wealthy rest.

Copies also circulated under the title The Hand of Fate, and the background of the image includes "Discobolos and Venus of Melos, the two most familiar of all ancient statues, representing the decadent life of luxury."

The art historian Carolyn Haynes observes:

Ker clearly intended this painting to inflame class divisions between productive workers and the wealthy upper class, as represented by strong but exploited workers trapped beneath the floor and well-to-do dancers at a society ball... That such a work could be painted, published, and widely discussed suggests that class divisions in the Progressive Era were real and widespread.

During the First World War, Balfour Ker also designed posters advertising United States government war savings stamps for the United States Treasury.

== Personal life ==
Ker was married twice. His first marriage was to Mary Ellen Sigsbee, a fellow socialist and a feminist, whose father, Charles D. Sigsbee, had been captain of the USS Maine during the Spanish–American War. The marriage was conducted against her father's wishes, after an 1898 elopement. They first lived in Greenwich Village, but after a period working in Paris, the marriage failed and they divorced in 1910. Following their divorce, Sigsbee married Anton Otto Fischer. All three were artists and former students of Howard Pyle. Ker and Sigsbee had a son, David (1906–1922), who was adopted by Fischer.

Ker's second wife was Josephine Reeder Phillips, an American model, whom he married in England in 1914. They lived there and in France, before returning to the United States. They had four children, some before they were married. These included three sons and a daughter, Yosene Balfour Ker, who was a model featured in several paintings by the artist John Sloan, and whose own daughter is actress Tuesday Weld (born Susan Ker Weld).

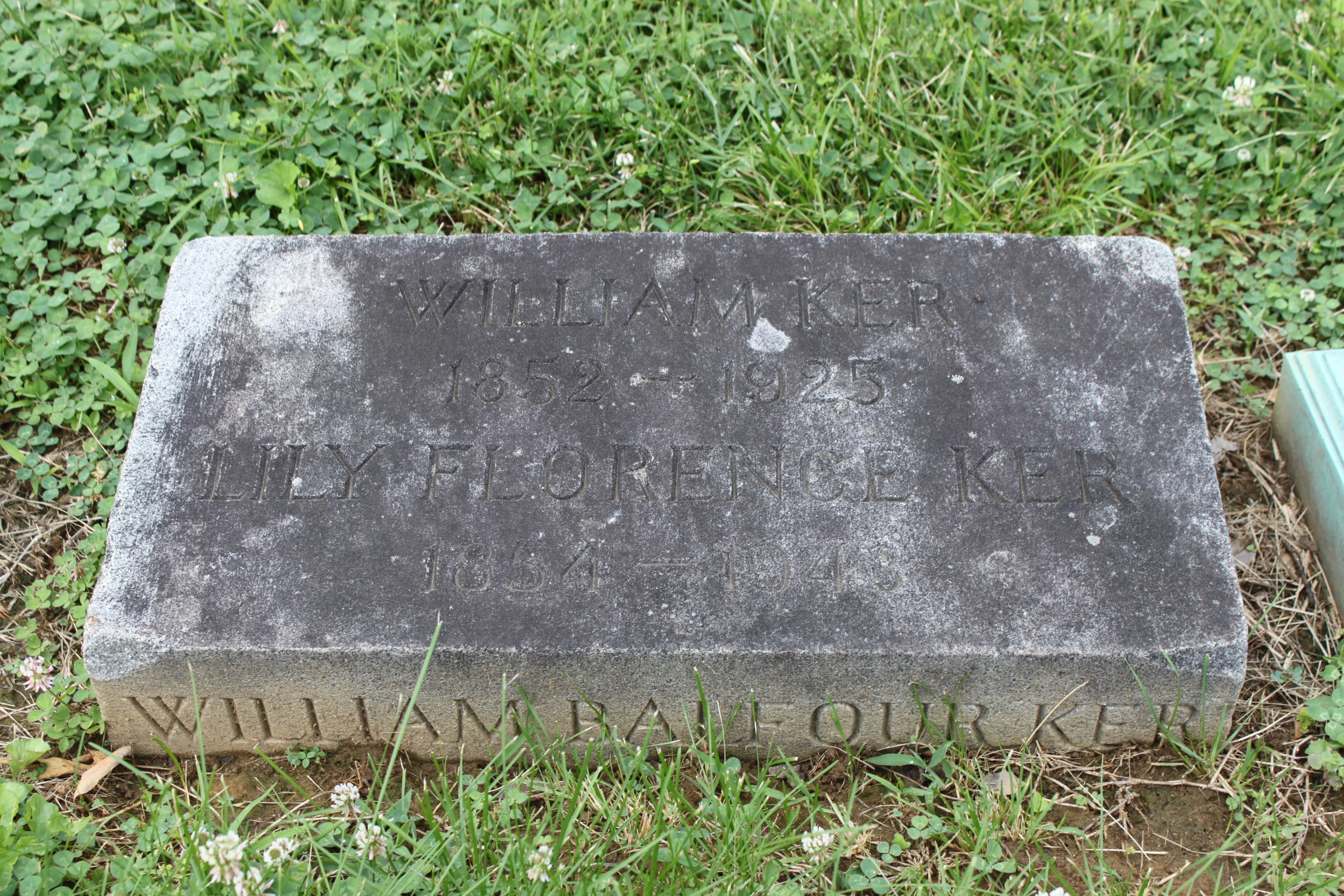
Grave of Ker in Rock Creek Cemetery

Ker died on October 20, 1918, in New York City, at the age of 41. Phillips died within a few years, leaving their four children, ranging in age from four to ten years, as orphans. On discovering that they were in the care of the Society for the Prevention of Cruelty to Children in Newark, New Jersey, Alexander Graham Bell wrote to the society, and to John Adams Kingsbury in April 1922, offering assistance. Ker is buried at Rock Creek Cemetery.

== Works illustrated ==
Books illustrated by Ker include:

- Lanier, Henry Wysham (1904). The Romance of Piscator. Henry Holt and Company.
- Mitchell, John Ames (1906). The Silent War. Life Publishing Company.
- Mitchell, John Ames (1910). Dr Thorne's Idea. Life Publishing Company.
- White, Bouck (1913). The Call of the Carpenter. Garden City, N.Y.: Doubleday, Page & Company.
