= Richardson Clover =

United States naval officer, hydrographer (1846–1919)

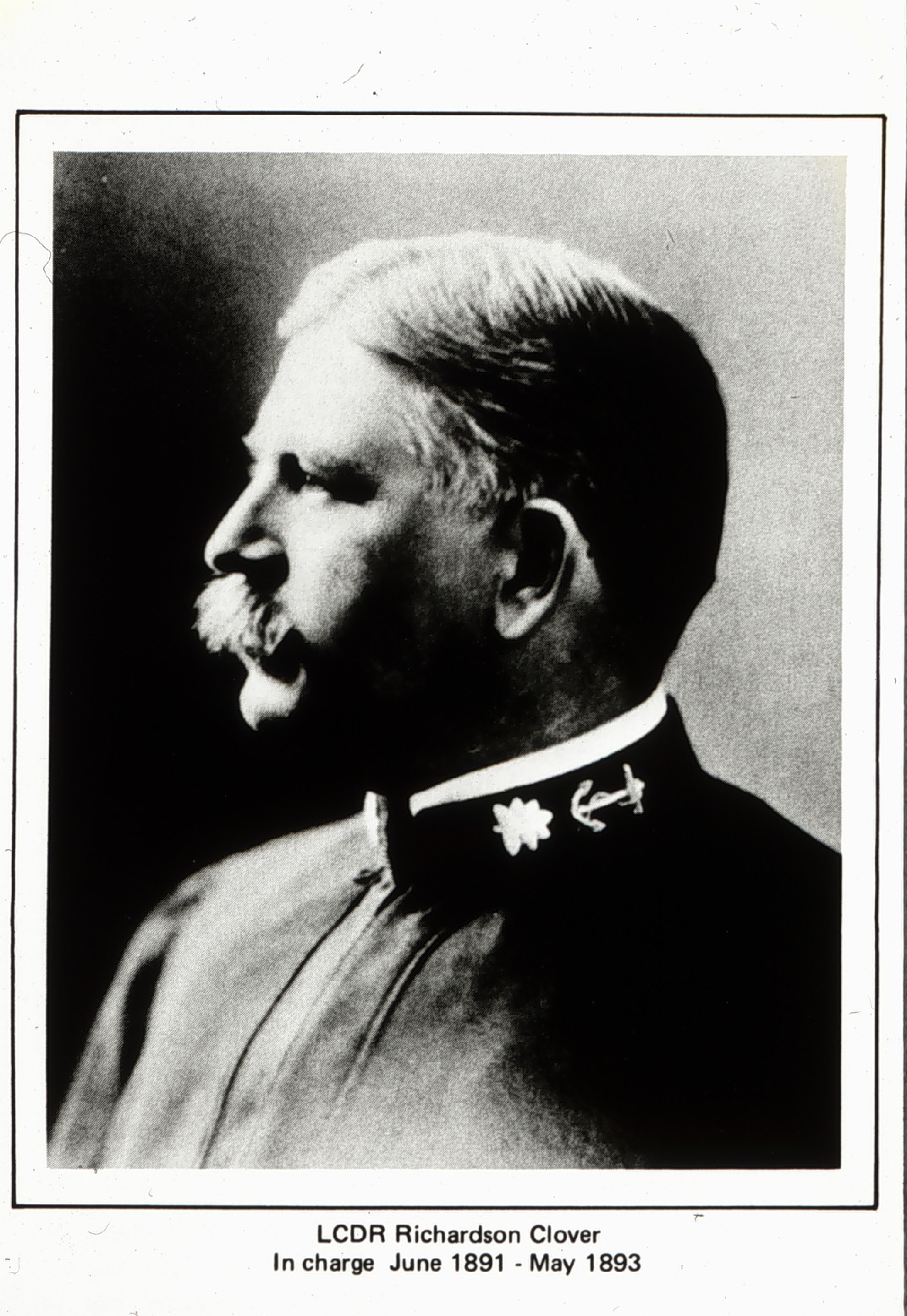
- Born: July 11, 1846; Hagerstown, Maryland
- Died: October 14, 1919 (aged 73); Laramie County, Wyoming
- Burial place: Arlington National Cemetery
- Military career
- Allegiance: United States
- Branch: United States Navy
- Service years: 1867–1908
- Rank: Rear Admiral
- Commands: USC&GS Palinurus; USC&GS Carlile P. Patterson; Naval Hydrographic Office; USS Dolphin; Office of Naval Intelligence; USS Bancroft; USS Wisconsin
- Conflicts: Spanish–American War
- Other work: Board on Geographic Names

Richardson Clover (July 11, 1846 – October 14, 1919) was an officer of the United States Navy. An 1867 graduate of the United States Naval Academy, he was a noted hydrographer, served as Director of Naval Intelligence, and commanded the gunboat Bancroft during the Spanish–American War. He was socially prominent in Washington, D.C., and served as US Naval Attaché to Great Britain. He commanded the Wisconsin on the Asiatic Station and served as president of the Board of Inspection and Survey. He was promoted to rear admiral in 1907 and retired in 1908.

== Biography ==
Clover was born in Hagerstown, Maryland, son of Lewis Peter Clover and Sarah Ann Ackerman Clover. His father was an artist who later became an Episcopal minister, serving congregations in Virginia, New Jersey, Illinois, and New York. Richardson Clover was appointed to the United States Naval Academy from Missouri in July 1863 and graduated in 1867. His first posting was to the frigate Susquehanna.

Clover had a varied career in the service including several hydrographic assignments. He served on the Coast Survey steamer Hassler on the Pacific coast 1874–77, and had a brief assignment to the Naval Hydrographic Office. He was again assigned to the Coast Survey in 1881, first in the Washington office and then commanding the schooner Palinurus surveying Long Island Sound. He supervised construction of the steamer Carlile P. Patterson and became her first commander. Under Clover, the Patterson sailed to California by way of the Straits of Magellan and subsequently made surveys in southeastern Alaska in 1885, covering the north shore of Dixon Entrance (except for Cordova Bay), and Clarence Strait as far north as Union Bay. He remained in charge of the Patterson and the Southeast Alaska survey until he was relieved by A.S Snow in March 1886. (Note: Clover has been credited with first use of the term Inside Passage, which he applied to a passage connecting Tongass Narrow and Clarence Strait north of Ketchikan in 1885. That passage is still marked on charts and is the only entry for Inside Passage in the 1906 Geographic Dictionary of Alaska. However, the term was used in the broader sense by the New York Times in 1884, and in government reports back to 1868, so that sense is not derived from Clover's usage.)

Following a year's leave accompanying his marriage, Clover was posted to the torpedo station at Newport and then attended the Naval War College from September 1887 until January 1888. Subsequently, he was posted as navigator on the Pensacola, then as executive officer on the Dolphin from December 1888 to December 1889. During this period Dolphin completed her round-the-world cruise.

He returned to the Hydrographic Office in 1889. He became acting hydrographer in September 1890 and was formally appointed hydrographer (i.e. head of the office) in May 1891, accompanying his appointment as lieutenant commander. In 1890 Clover was named by President Benjamin Harrison in Executive Order No. 28 as a member of the newly created Board on Geographic Names, where he served as secretary of the board under Thomas Mendenhall, the first chairman of the Board on Geographic Names. He continued as Hydrographer until 1893.

Clover served on the Phythian Board on the reorganization of the Navy. Subsequently, he was posted to the cruiser Chicago, serving as executive officer under Captain Alfred Thayer Mahan, author of The Influence of Sea Power upon History. In December 1895, he was appointed to the Board revising Naval Regulations. Subsequently, he commanded the Dolphin in 1896-7.

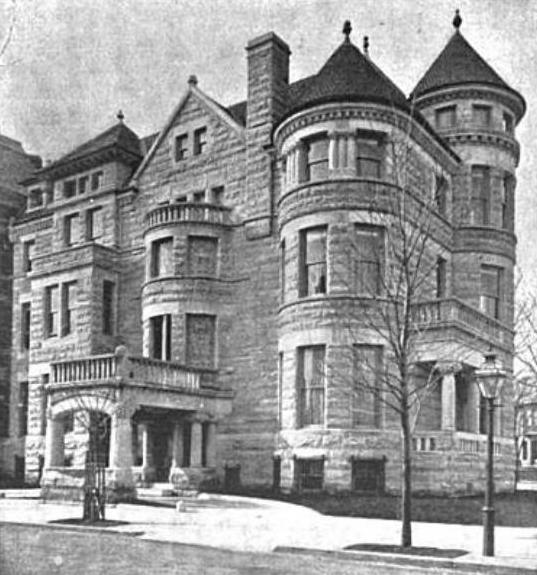
Richardson Clover residence in Washington, D.C.,, from an 1897 magazine article

Clover was appointed Chief Intelligence Officer of the Office of Naval Intelligence from November 1897 to May 1898 and then again from October 1898 to February 1900. While on his first term as Chief Intelligence Officer, then-Cmdr. Clover was also member of the War and Strategy Board established by the Secretary of the Navy John D. Long to provide him with operational and strategic advice. Also on that board was Assistant Secretary of the Navy Theodore Roosevelt. In the period leading up to the Spanish–American War, Clover organized intelligence-gathering efforts to establish the location, condition, and order of battle of the Spanish naval forces. These efforts included espionage as well as the more usual compilation of information from open and diplomatic channels. However, when the war started, Clover left his position to take an active combat position as commanding officer of the gunboat Bancroft from May to September 1898.

After his stint on the Bancroft Clover resumed his duties as Chief Intelligence Officer until February 1900, then was reassigned as the Naval Attaché at the U.S. Embassy in London from April 1900 to June 1903 He was promoted to captain on April 11, 1902. After a short hiatus at home he became the commanding officer of the battleship Wisconsin from January 1904 to December 1905, while for most of this time also serving as Chief-of-Staff of the Asiatic Fleet. Then after a one-year hiatus he became a member, then the president of the Board of Inspection and Survey from February 1907 to July 1908, during which he was promoted to rear admiral. He retired on July 11, 1908.

Clover died on October 14, 1919, aboard a Union Pacific train, west of Cheyenne, Wyoming while en route from San Francisco, California to Washington, D.C. He is buried with his wife in Arlington National Cemetery.

== Personal life ==
Clover was married on May 19, 1886, to Mary Eudora Miller. She was the daughter of Senator John F. Miller from California, the wealthy former head of the Alaska Commercial Company. Clover named Dora Bay, Miller Lake, and Mt. Eudora in Alaska, presumably for her, in 1885. The Clovers had two daughters, Beatrice Miller Clover and Mary Eudora Miller Clover. Beatrice married Thomas Holcomb, who served as Commandant of the United States Marine Corps during the early part of World War II. Mary Eudora Miller Clover never married and died October 11, 1954, in San Francisco.

== Namesakes ==
Clover Bay and Clover Passage in the Alexander Archipelago, Alaska, are named for him. Clover Deep, an undersea valley at 37N, 137 W off the coast of California, was named for him in 1895. The name changed to Glover Deep as the result of a transcription error, and neither name is in current use.

== Gallery ==
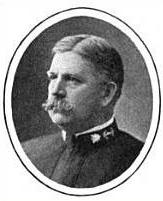

== Notes ==
| Preceded by Richard Wainright | Head of the Office of Naval Intelligence (Chief Intelligence Officer); November 1897 – May 1898 | Succeeded by John R. Bartlett |
| Preceded by John R. Bartlett | Head of the Office of Naval Intelligence (Chief Intelligence Officer) (reappointed); October 1898 – February 1900 | Succeeded by Charles D. Sigsbee |
