= SS Saint Paul (1895) =

1895 American ocean liner

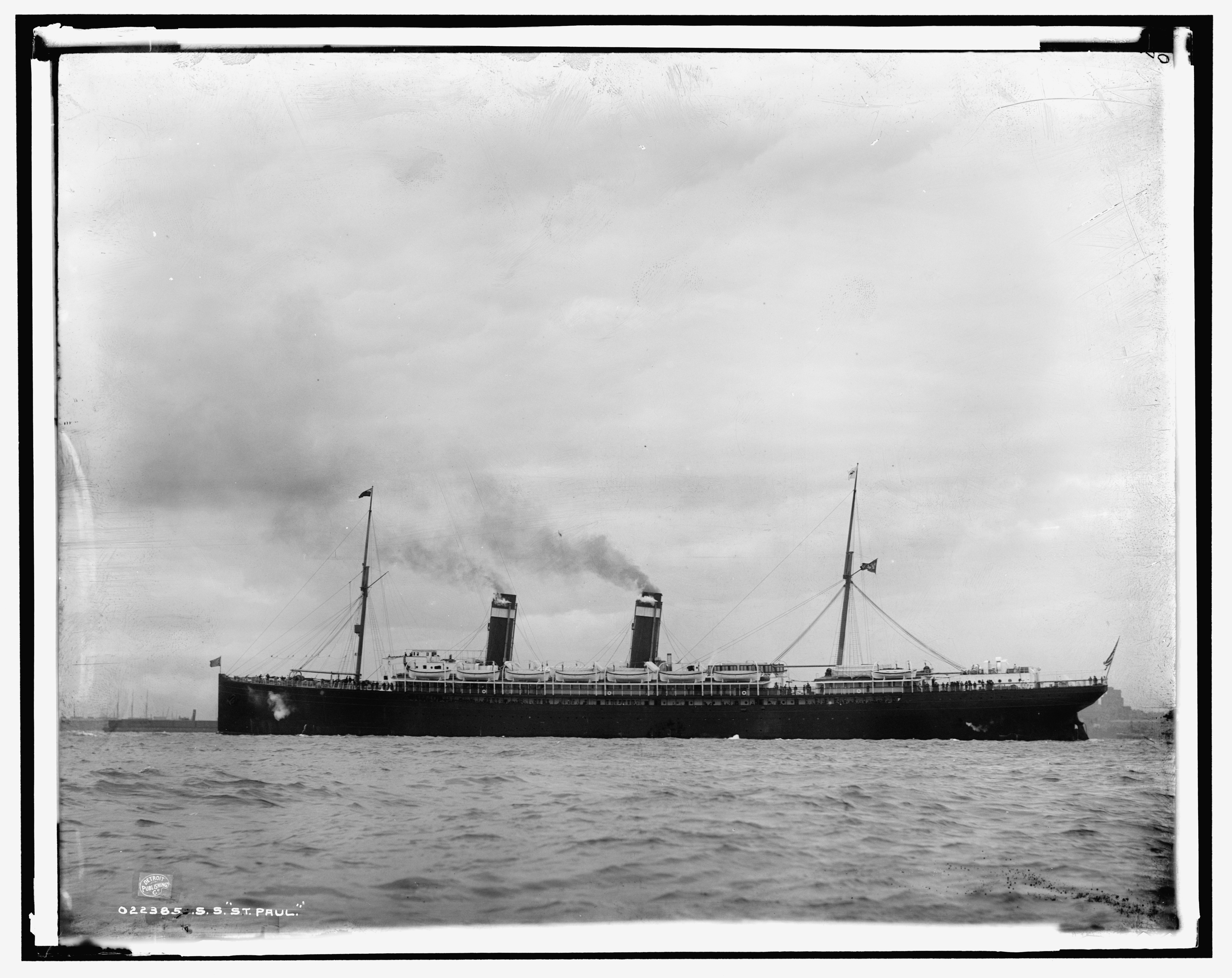
- SS Saint Paul under steam

History

United States
- Name: USS Saint Paul
- Builder: William Cramp & Sons, Philadelphia
- Yard number: 278
- Launched: 10 April 1895
- Acquired: by charter, 12 March 1898
- Commissioned: 20 April 1898
- Decommissioned: 2 September 1898
- Recommissioned: 27 October 1917
- Decommissioned: 14 January 1919
- Fate: Scrapped in 1923
- Notes: Returned to owner, 24 March 1919

General characteristics
- Type: Passenger ship/Auxiliary cruiser
- Displacement: 14,910 long tons (15,150 t)
- Length: 553 ft 2 in (168.61 m)
- Beam: 63 ft (19 m)
- Draft: 28 ft (8.5 m)
- Speed: 22 kn (25 mph; 41 km/h)
- Capacity: 1,420 passengers (320 first class, 200 second class, 900 steerage)
- Complement: 381 officers and enlisted (as naval ship)
- Armament: 6 × 5 in (130 mm) guns; 6 × 6-pounder guns; 6 × 3-pounder guns

SS Saint Paul was a trans-Atlantic ocean liner named for the capital of Minnesota.

== Construction, acquisition, and commissioning ==
Saint Paul was launched on 10 April 1895 by William Cramp & Sons, Philadelphia, as a steel passenger liner. The ship later was chartered for United States Navy service as an auxiliary cruiser from her owner, International Navigation Company, by a board appointed on 12 March 1898; and commissioned on 20 April 1898 for Spanish–American War service, Captain Charles D. Sigsbee in command.

== Incident with the RMS Campania ==
At about 2A.M. on January 25, 1896, the SS St. Paul, of the American line, went aground while on its way toward New York Harbor. It was alleged that the steamship had been racing the RMS Campania, a British ocean liner owned by the Cunard Line, but that fog had caused the grounding. At the time, the St. Paul and her sister ship, the St. Louis, were the largest vessels ever constructed in America, with each able to carry 320 first class passengers, 200 second class passengers, and 900 emigrants. The RMS Campania was additionally the largest and fastest passenger liner afloat at the time. No one was hurt in the incident, with approximately 265 passengers (65 first class, 75 second class, and 125 steerage passengers) from the St. Paul successfully evacuated from the ship and ferried on to New York. The St. Paul, however, remained grounded for more than a week afterwards.

In the aftermath, both captains and their respective companies denied allegations that a race had occurred just before the grounding, despite reports to the contrary from passengers and even crew members. Vernon H. Young, a representative of the Cunard Steamship Company (of which the Campania was a part), forbade the Campania’s captain, Capt. Walker, from speaking with the media about the incident. Captain Walker had already admitted to the race, however, saying in an interview: “We sighted the St. Paul at 8:30 o’clock Friday morning, when she was fifteen miles ahead of us on the port bow. Then we both went at it as hard as we could. […] We kept on at racing speed for four hours, and finally passed her.” Similarly, a crew member from the St. Paul, Mall Master Hart, told the media plainly: “We were racing when we struck.”

At the time of the incident, the St. Paul had already been the scene of several other accidents. One of these accidents involved the death of several crewmembers on December 18, 1895 when the main steam pipe supplying one of the engines burst in two places, filling the engine room with steam and scalding 5 men to death while severely injuring 5 others, 4 of whom subsequently died.

== Service history ==
=== Spanish–American War ===
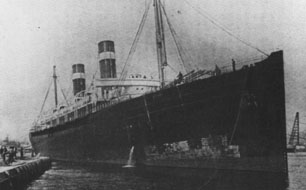
Saint Paul in port.

Departing Philadelphia on 5 May 1898, Saint Paul's first assignment was to cruise in search of Admiral Cervera's squadron between Morant Point, Jamaica, and western Haiti. She captured the British collier Restormel—bound for Cuba with a critical cargo of Cardiff coal—on 25 May and sent her into Key West under a prize crew. She cruised off Santiago de Cuba and Guantanamo Bay into mid-June, then sailed to join the force blockading San Juan, Puerto Rico.

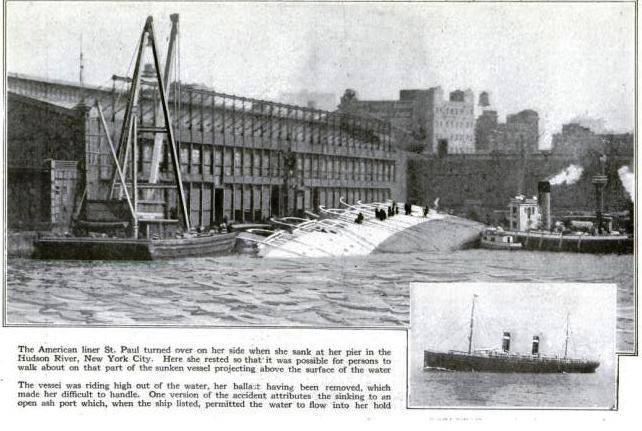
Saint Paul capsized at the pier in New York. Caption from Popular Science Magazine July 1918 edition

Saint Paul arrived off San Juan on the morning of 22 June. Shortly after midday, in the second battle of San Juan, the Spanish cruiser Isabel II, emerged from the harbor and, remaining under protection of shore batteries, opened fire on Saint Paul at long range without success. Isabel II was joined shortly by the destroyer Terror, which attempted to close Saint Paul to launch torpedoes. Saint Paul took Terror under heavy fire, scoring at least one direct hit which heavily damaged the destroyer. Terror gave up the attack and returned to port, followed by Isabel II. Saint Paul was relieved by Yosemite off San Juan on the 26th and made for New York to coal.

Saint Paul spent the remainder of her Spanish–American War service as a transport, operating for 48 days in July–August as a War Department vessel. She landed troops at Siboney, Cuba, and Arroyo, Puerto Rico, subsequently returning soldiers from Guantanamo Bay to New York City through 15 August. Entering the Cramp shipyard on 22 August for re-conversion to mercantile service, Saint Paul was decommissioned on 2 September and returned to her owner the same day.

=== Collision ===
On 25 April 1908, outward bound from Southampton, England, in a late snowstorm, Saint Paul was involved in a collision with the British cruiser HMS Gladiator in the Needles Channel. Gladiator foundered in shallow water with the loss of 27 crew, but Saint Paul was able to return to Southampton for repairs.

=== World War I ===
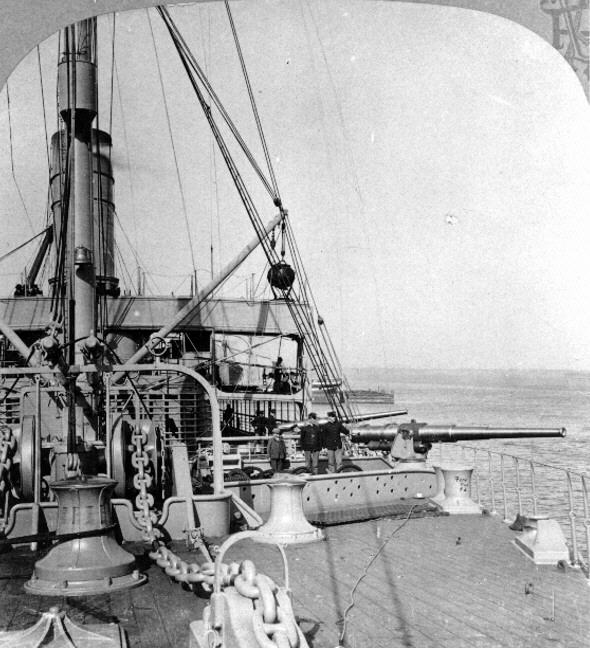
Image of one of Saint Paul's deck guns.

Saint Paul was again taken over for wartime service on 27 October 1917. Operated by the United States Shipping Board as a transport on the War Department account, she retained her merchant crew and carried a naval armed guard on board. She made twelve voyages between New York and Liverpool, England. She was transferred to the Navy account in April 1918; designated SP-1643; and overhauled at New York. Then, while being towed to her berth from dry dock on 28 April with her ballast removed, she capsized in the North River. Righted on 11 September, she was subsequently turned over to the Commandant, 3rd Naval District, on 17 October.

Saint Paul entered the New York Navy Yard the following day, but the end of World War I led to cancellation of plans to convert the ship to a troopship.

=== Post-war ===
Placed in temporary commission on 14 January 1919 for the purpose of fixing responsibility for her care outside the Navy Yard, Saint Paul soon began reconversion for mercantile service. Returned to her owner on 24 March 1919, Saint Paul was scrapped in Germany in 1923.

=== Postage stamp ===
As part of the celebrations surrounding the 1901 Pan-American Exposition a set of six commemorative postage stamps were issued. The highest value, 10 cents, shows Saint Paul under steam. While the three lowest stamps in the series include rare inverted printings, no errors are known for this issue.
