= Second Battle of San Juan (1898) =

Naval battle during the Spanish-American War (1898)

- Part of the Spanish–American War
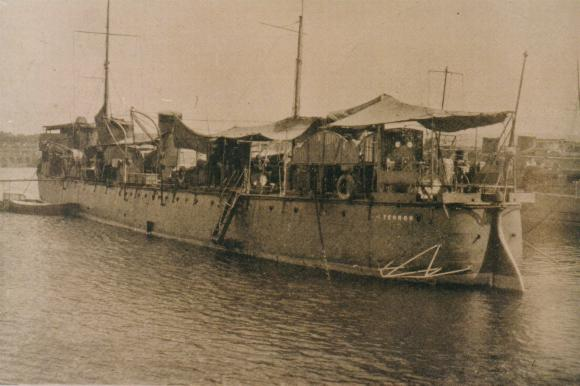
- Terror undergoing repairs after the battle
Date	22 June 1898
Location	Off San Juan, Caribbean Sea
Result	American victory

Belligerents
United States	Spanish Navy

Commanders and leaders
Charles Sigsbee	Unknown

Strength
1 auxiliary cruiser	1 unprotected cruiser 1 destroyer

Casualties and losses
1 auxiliary cruiser damaged	2 killed 5 wounded 1 destroyer damaged

The Second Battle of San Juan occurred on 22 June 1898 when two Spanish vessels tried to break the American blockade off San Juan.

== Background ==
San Juan had been under blockade by American forces since April 1898. Most of the time, the blockade consisted of a single auxiliary cruiser which patrolled and pursued blockade runners that were attempting to reach San Juan. By June, the task of blockading San Juan was delegated to the auxiliary cruiser USS Saint Paul, a former ocean liner commanded by Captain Charles Sigsbee who had formerly commanded the USS Maine. The Spanish destroyer Terror, originally part of Admiral Cervera's squadron, had mechanical trouble and left the main Spanish fleet eventually reaching San Juan. With Terror and several other naval vessels at their disposal, the Spanish decided to make an attempt at breaking the blockade. Terror and the old cruiser Isabel II set off from San Juan to engage St. Paul while a crowd of jubilant locals at the harbor cheered them on.

== Battle ==
Almost as soon as the Spanish ships engaged the American vessel, they realized that Isabel II would have to retire, as she was much slower than the American ship. Terror attempted to cover the cruiser's escape with a torpedo attack but was thwarted when fire from St. Paul put her rudder out of action. The ship then turned, which allowed St. Paul to score direct hits near Terror's waterline. These hits disabled one of Terror's engines and caused her to list. Terror then fled the engagement and beached herself on a nearby bank to keep from sinking.

== Aftermath ==
The Spanish sortie had failed. The Americans had inflicted several casualties on the Spanish, put Terror out of action for the rest of the war, and maintained their blockade. The small Spanish squadron was not finished however and would sortie once more later in the war.
