= Anton Otto Fischer =

American painter (1882–1962)

- Born: Anton Otto Fischer; February 23, 1882; Regensburg, Germany
- Died: March 26, 1962 (aged 80); Woodstock, New York
- Resting place: Montrepose Cemetery, Kingston, New York
- Known for: Illustration, painting

Anton Otto Fischer (February 23, 1882 – March 26, 1962) was a German-born American illustrator for The Saturday Evening Post.

== Background ==
Born in Germany and orphaned at any early age, he ran away at the age of 15 to escape being forced into priesthood. He came to America as a deck hand on a German vessel. He sacrificed two months’ pay to obtain his freedom and then went on to sail on American ships for three years. For a fourteen-month period in 1905–1906, he worked as a model and general handyman for artist Arthur Burdette Frost. He went to Paris in October 1906 and studied for two years with Jean Paul Laurens at the Academie Julian, spending summers painting landscapes in Normandy. Fischer returned to New York City in January 1908. After being influenced by Howard Pyle, he moved to Wilmington, Delaware, where he established a studio at 1110 Franklin Street. Pyle helped him transform his firsthand knowledge into pictorial drama, but had little success in enlivening his lead-colored palette. He freelanced in "subject pictures," or illustrations telling a human interest story that were in popular magazines of the day. During World War II he was made the artist laureate of the United States Coast Guard.

Fischer married Mary Ellen ("May") Sigsbee (1877–1960) following her divorce from fellow artist William Balfour Ker (1877–1918). (Note: Mary Ellen Sigsbee was first married to William Balfour Ker; they were married March 30, 1900, in Manhattan, New York. After divorcing Ker, she married Fischer October 2, 1912, in Manhattan, New York.) Sigsbee, Balfour Ker and Fischer were all artist and former students of Howard Pyle. After marriage, he adopted his wife's son from her first marriage, David (1906–1922). They first lived in Bushnellsville, New York, before moving to a house near the intersection of Elmendorf Street and Ten Broeck Avenue in nearby Kingston. The house still stands today and has a large north facing window that gave Fischer the light he needed to paint. In 1914, the couple had a child of their own, Katrina Sigsbee Fischer (1914–1998). The family eventually settled into a house off Glasco Turnpike in Woodstock, New York, just prior to World War II.

== Career as an illustrator ==
After moving back to New York City in 1910, Fischer sold his first illustration to Harper's Weekly, then illustrated an Everybody's Magazine story by Jack London, for whom he would illustrate many books and magazine stories until London's death in 1916. Also in 1910, Fischer began illustrating for The Saturday Evening Post, a relationship that would last for forty-eight years. He illustrated such stories as Kyne's "Cappy Ricks," Gilpatrick's "Glencannon," as well as serials by Kenneth Roberts, and Nordoff and Hall. From 1909 to 1920 he created more than one thousand illustrations featuring women and babies, pretty girls, dogs and horses, sports, the Navy and the sea. He later went on to illustrate Tugboat Annie in 1931. He confessed his favorite character was "that old reprobate Glencannon," with the big broom moustache.

U.S. Navy Commander Lincoln Lothrop had once written to the artist: "My two lads, one of whom is now a twenty-two-year-old lieutenant in the Navy … used to cut out your pictures and pin them on the walls of their rooms. … You are responsible for recruiting many a seagoing lad." His work on seascapes got Fischer an invitation to lunch with Vice Admiral Russell Waesche, Commandant of the Coast Guard, for the purpose of recruiting at the height of World War II. The January 9, 1943, Post described a good encounter with the Vice Admiral. Although Waesche knew Fischer was born in (Germany) and anti-New Dealer, but by late that same afternoon, Fischer was sworn in as a lieutenant commander in the Coast Guard. He was charged with putting on canvas some of the heroic deeds of the Merchant Mariners and Coast Guardsmen, then considered at the time the least publicized men of the armed forces. His drawings are archived in the Coast Guard Academy in New London, Connecticut.

Also known for illustrating books such as Moby Dick, Treasure Island, and 20,000 Leagues Under the Sea, Fischer died far from his beloved sea in the Catskill Mountains of Woodstock, New York, in 1962 at the age of 80.

The Friends of Historic Kingston hosted a lecture featuring Fischer's great-nephew, Andre Mele, in September 2011. Mele remembered "Uncle Otto" with a heavy German accent who often enjoyed playing the piano and smoking cigars. He could frequently be found gardening or listening to the New York Yankees on the radio through his headphones. Fischer was often sought after for his investment advice and amassed a $2 million fortune during his lifetime.

== Examples of Fischer's work ==
Saturday Evening Post (April 16, 1910)

Saturday Evening Post (February 11, 1911)

Captain at Sea (1911) oil on canvas, 27.5-inch. by 20.5-inch.

Cosmopolitan Story Illustration (c. 1911) Oil on canvas en grisaille, 30-inch. x 21-inch.

Man in Rigging (1918) oil on canvas, 30-inch. by 20-inch.

The Scuffle Below (1918) oil on canvas, 24-inch. x 28-inch.

Saloon Shoot Out (1919) oil on canvas, 30-inch. by 20-inch.

Story Illustration (1919) oil on canvas, 24.5-inch. by 16-inch.

Peril at Sea (1920) oil on canvas, 26-inch. by 30.25-inch.

The Country Gentleman (April 16, 1921)

== See also ==
- American propaganda during World War II
