= Mary Ellen Sigsbee =

American artist and magazine illustrator

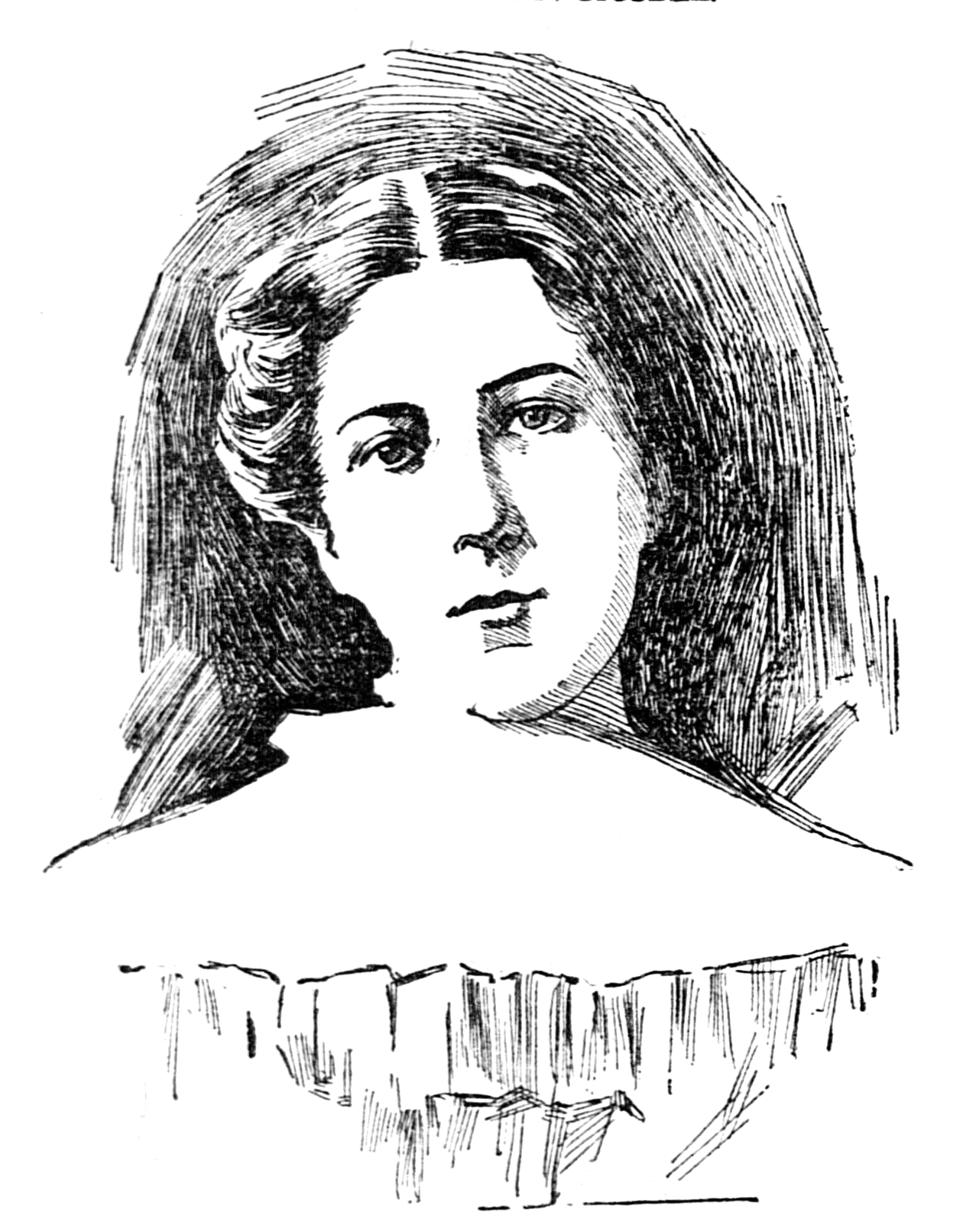
- 1899 portrait sketch
- Born: February 26, 1876; New Orleans, Louisiana, United States
- Died: 1960 (aged 83–84); Woodstock, New York, United States
- Occupations: Painter, illustrator, artist
- Spouse(s): William Balfour Ker, Anton Otto Fischer
- Father: Charles Dwight Sigsbee

Mary Ellen Sigsbee (1876–1960) was an American artist and magazine illustrator.

== Early life ==
Sigsbee was born in New Orleans, on February 26, 1876, one of four daughters of Charles D. Sigsbee, captain of the USS Maine during the Spanish–American War.

== Career ==
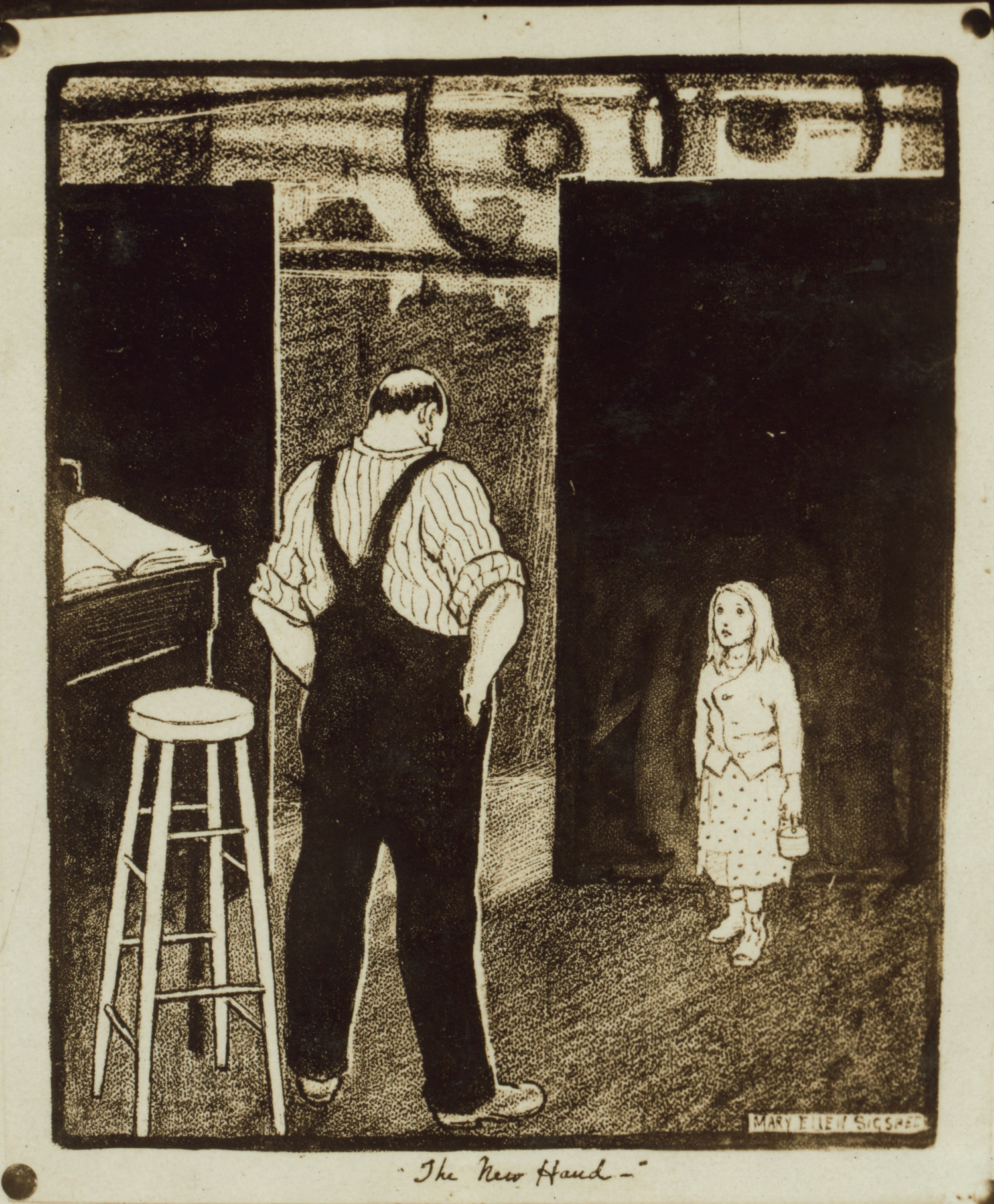
The New Hand

Sigsbee studied at the Arts Students League. One of her paintings was exhibited at the Paris Salon in 1908 - a feat achieved by few American women.

A feminist and suffragist, Sisgbee designed posters for the American Woman Suffrage Association. One of which, What breaks up the home? What will save the home? Votes for Women (circa 1917), is in the privately held Ann Lewis Women's Suffrage Collection.

From 1909 to 1917, and from 1930 to 1932, she made illustrations for the Evening Journal. Her painting The Christmas Peek was used as the Christmas 1934 cover of the Saturday Evening Post. She also produced work for Harper's Magazine.

A copy of her print The New Hand is in the National Child Labor Committee Collection of the United States Library of Congress.

== Personal life ==
Sigsbee was married twice. Her first marriage was to William Balfour Ker, a fellow artist and socialist. The marriage was conducted against her father's wishes, after an 1898 elopement. They first lived in Greenwich Village, but after a period working in Paris, the marriage failed and they divorced in 1910. They had a son, David (1906–1922).

In 1912 she married the magazine illustrator Anton Otto Fischer. They first lived in Bushnellsville, New York before moving to a house near the intersection of Elmendorf Street and Ten Broeck Avenue in nearby Kingston (the house still stands). They had a daughter, Katrina Sigsbee Fischer (1914–1998). The family eventually settled into a house off Glasco Turnpike in Woodstock, New York just prior to World War II.

Sigsbee and both husbands were former students of illustrator Howard Pyle. Her son David was adopted by Fischer. During her marriages she used the names Sigsbee Ker and Sigsbee Fischer.

Sigsbee died in 1960, at Woodstock.
