= Caroline French Benton =

Caroline Frances Burrell, née Benedict (died 20 September 1923) was a prolific author who wrote under the pseudonym Caroline French Benton.

== Works ==
- Gala Day Luncheons (1901)
- A Little Cook-Book for a Little Girl (1905)
- The Mother's Book (1909)
- A Little Girl's Cookery Book (with Mary Florence Hodge) (1911)
- Easy Meals (1913)
- The Fun of Cooking (1915)
- The Complete Club Book for Women (1915)
- Little Housekeeping Book for a Little Girl (1925)
