= Payne Erskine =

American novelist

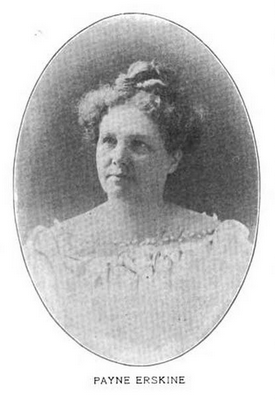
Payne Erskine, from a 1902 publication.

Emma Payne Erskine (May 10, 1854 – March 4, 1924) was the author of several works of fiction around the turn of the 20th century, such as The Eye of Dread and The Mountain Girl. She usually had a strong heroine figure, and her writing has been described as "genuinely American in feeling and treatment." A popular writer of her genre during her time, her romance novel, The Mountain Girl, was a leading story in Ladies' Home Journal shortly after it was published.

== Early life ==
In 1854, Erskine was born in Racine, Wisconsin, to Alfred Payne and Olive Child. Alfred was an artist, which may have led to her portrayal of her main character's father in The Eye of Dread as an artist. She seems to have let her personal life affect the characters and events in her stories quite often, actually. It is possible and likely that her childhood at the brunt of the United States Civil War affected her creation of certain stories which take place at that same time. Being of both English and prominently American ancestry, her stories, such as The Mountain Girl, seem to attempt to draw the two cultures together.

== Marriage and adult life ==
She married in 1873 to Charles Edwin Erskine and had six children with him. His father Massena Erskine was a partner in the J.I. Case Threshing Machine Company. However, in 1908, Charles died. In 1917, just less than ten years after her first husband's death, she married again to Cecil Corwin from New York City, a lifelong friend of hers and an early mentor to Frank Lloyd Wright. Throughout her life she was a strong Christian and a patriot. She commonly defended her country's ideals and busied herself with the issues of her nation. She wrote, in total, ten works of fiction, mostly American themed and taking place in North Carolina.

== Death ==
She died in 1924, a resident of the town of Tryon, North Carolina. She had taken a journey shortly before her death to a convention for peace in Washington, D.C.
