= East Side Presbyterian Church =

Historic church in New York, United States

- U.S. National Register of Historic Places
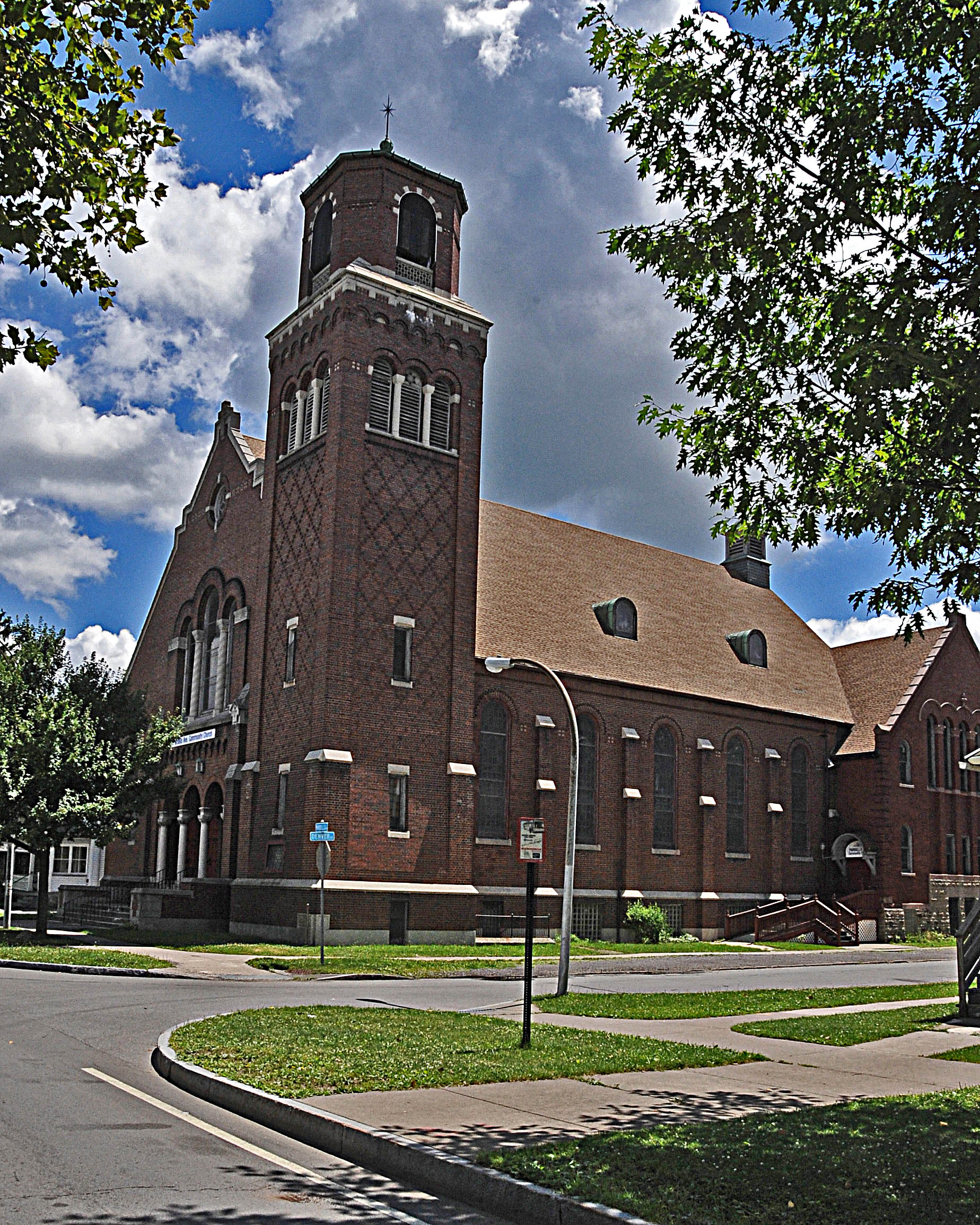

- Location within New York Location within the United States
- Location: 345 Parsells St., Rochester, New York
- Coordinates: 43°9′56″N 77°34′10″W
- Area: 0.29 acres (0.12 ha)
- Built: 1909-1911, 1925-1926
- Architect: Larzalere, Herbert L.; Bohacket and Brew
- Architectural style: Romanesque Revival, Late 19th and 20th Century Revivals
- NRHP reference No.: 10000898
- Added to NRHP: November 10, 2010

East Side Presbyterian Church, now known as Parsells Avenue Community Church, is a historic Presbyterian church located in the Beechwood neighborhood of Rochester, Monroe County, New York. The church was built in 1925-1925 and is a large rectangular brick building with cast stone trim in the Romanesque Revival style. The church features a tall engaged square tower with an octagonal cupola at its northwest corner. Attached to the church is a two-story education wing constructed between 1909 and 1911. It housed the original church and is also in the Romanesque Revival style.

The church was listed on the National Register of Historic Places in 2010.

== Gallery ==
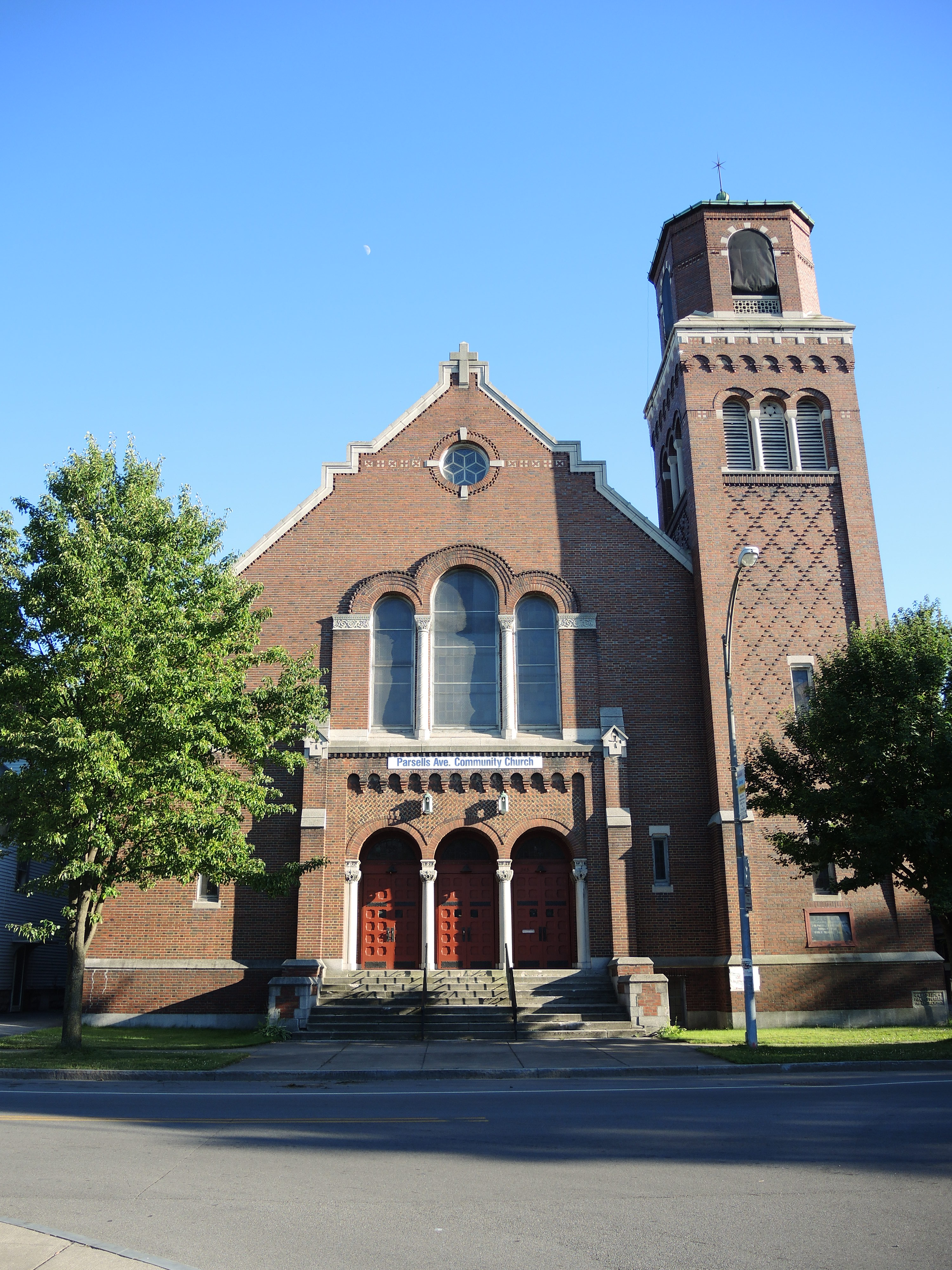

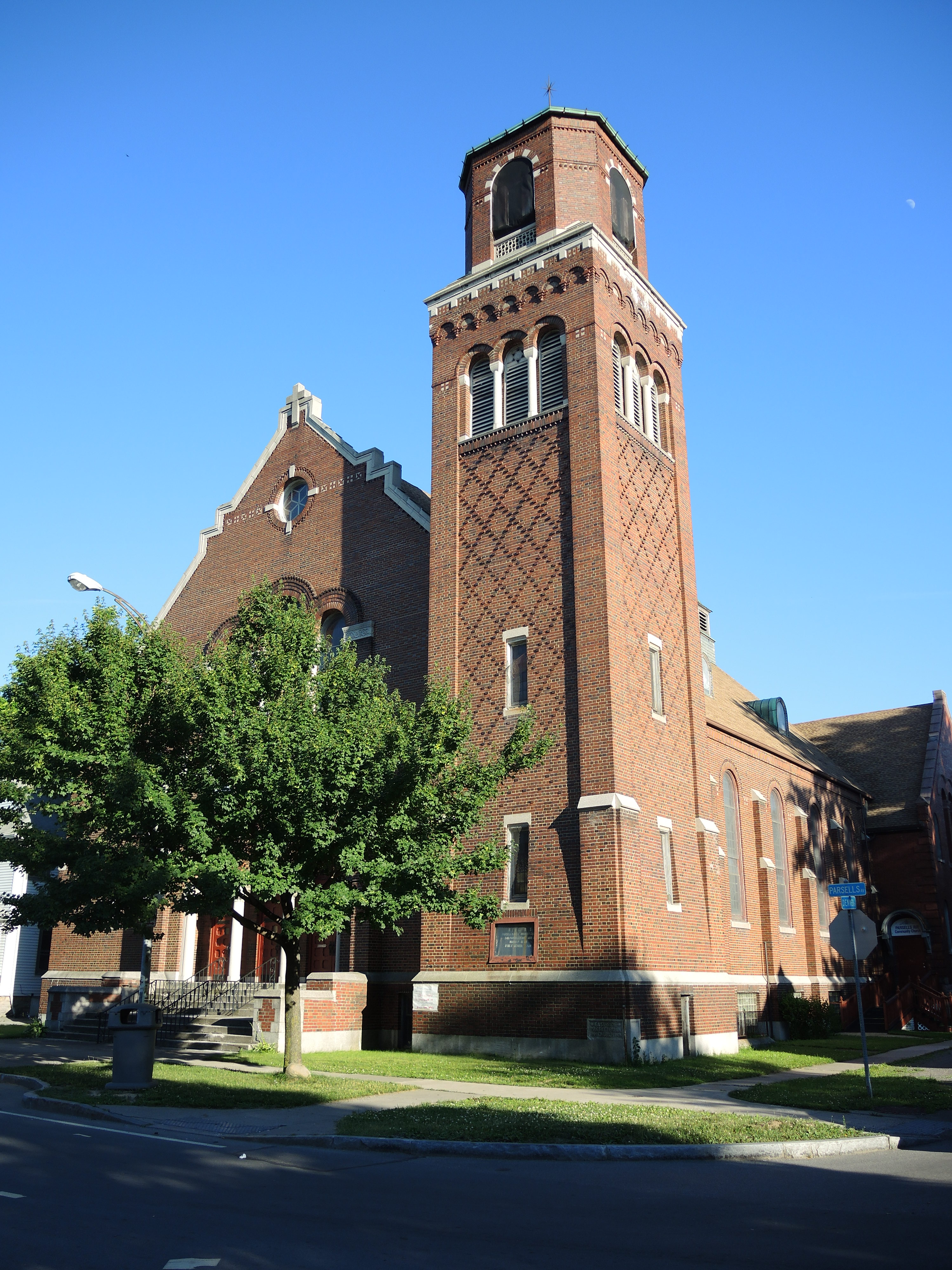
