= Sigsbee, Missouri =

Unincorporated community in Missouri, U.S.

Coordinates: 39°54′27″N 91°52′08″W

Sigsbee is an unincorporated community in Shelby County, in the U.S. state of Missouri.

== History ==
A post office called Sigsbee was established in 1898, and remained in operation until 1906. The community has the name of Charles Dwight Sigsbee, a former Rear Admiral in the United States Navy.
