= Charles Dwight Sigsbee =

American Rear Admiral (1845–1923)

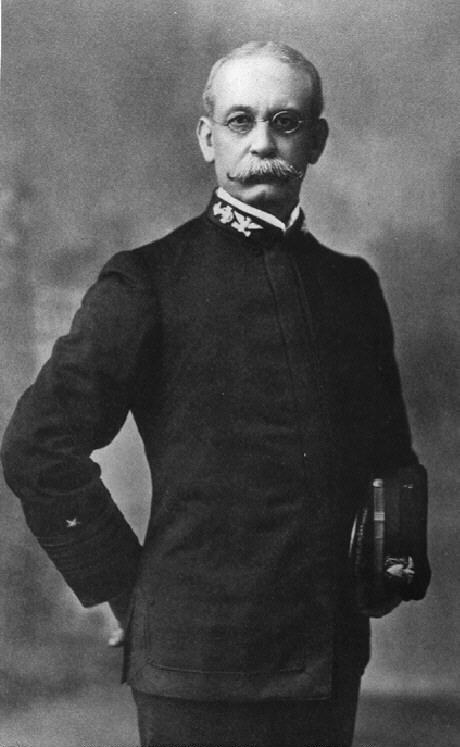
- Rear Admiral Charles D. Sigsbee
- Born: January 16, 1845; Albany, New York, U.S.
- Died: July 13, 1923 (aged 78); New York City, New York, U.S.
- Burial place: Arlington National Cemetery, Virginia, U.S.
- Education: The Albany Academy
- Military career
- Allegiance: United States
- Branch: United States Navy
- Service years: 1862–1907
- Rank: Rear admiral
- Commands: USS Maine; USS Texas; South Atlantic Squadron
- Conflicts: American Civil War: Operations in Mobile Bay; Battle of Mobile Bay; Wilmington campaigns; First Battle of Fort Fisher; Second Battle of Fort Fisher; Formosan Expedition; Spanish–American War: Sinking of Maine; Puerto Rico campaign; Second Battle of San Juan

Charles Dwight Sigsbee (January 16, 1845 – July 13, 1923) was a rear admiral in the United States Navy. In his earlier career, he was a pioneering oceanographer and hydrographer. He is best remembered as the captain of USS Maine, which exploded in Havana Harbor, Cuba, in 1898 and set off the events that led up to the start of the Spanish–American War. He was elected to the American Philosophical Society in 1899.

== Early life ==
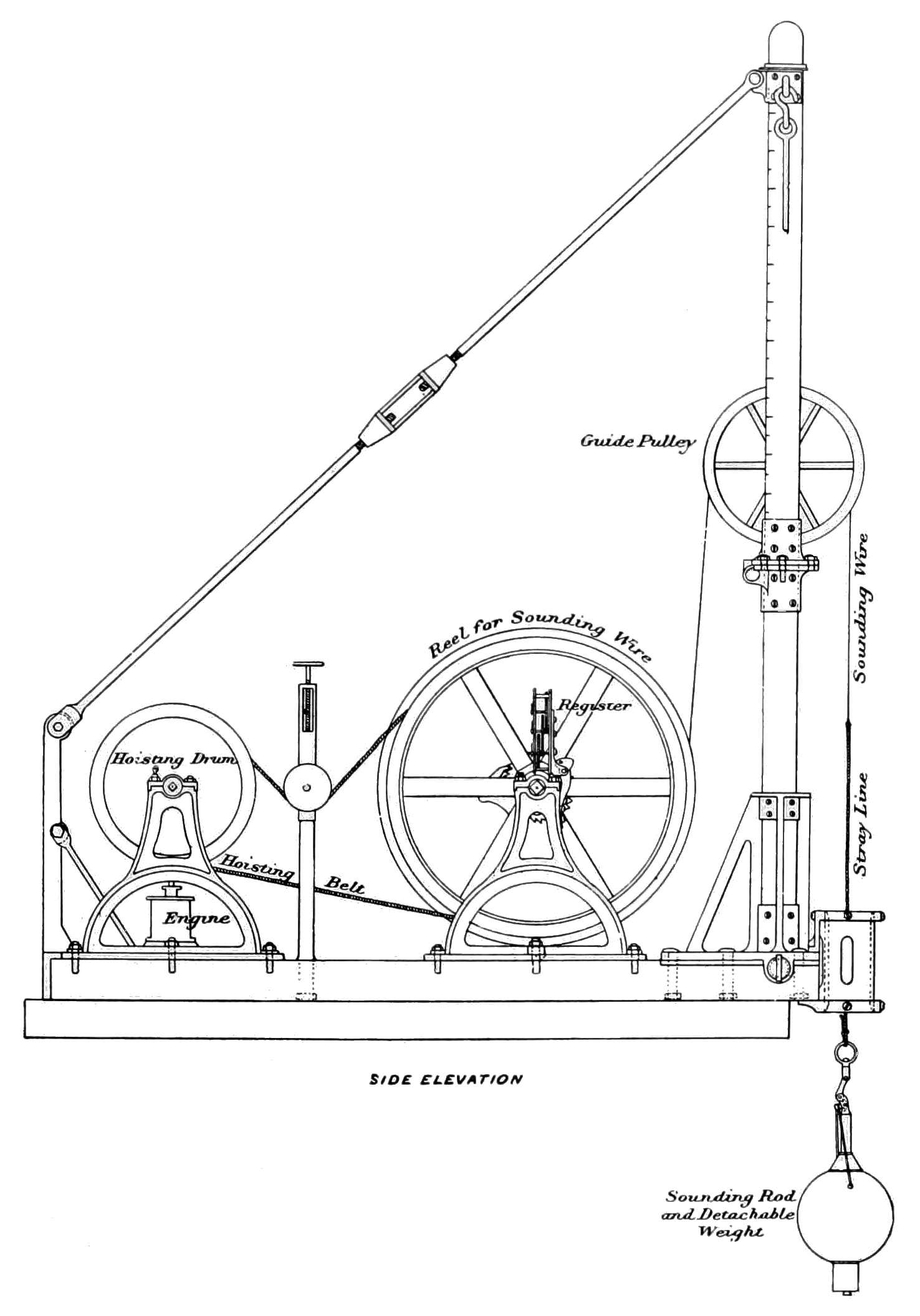
The Sigsbee sounding machine

Sigsbee was born in Albany, New York, and educated at The Albany Academy. He was appointed acting midshipman on 16 July 1862.

== Military career ==
Sigsbee fought in numerous engagements during the American Civil War, mostly against Confederate forts and batteries. Sigsbee served aboard Monongahela, Wyoming, and Shenandoah from 1863 to 1869, when he was assigned to duty at the Naval Academy. In 1871, he was assigned to the Hydrographic Office. He was first posted to the Hydrographic Office in 1873. He was assigned to the Coast Survey in 1874 and commanded the Coast Survey steamer Blake from 1875 to 1878. He returned to the Navy Hydrographic Office from 1878 to 1882 and served as hydrographer in the Bureau of Navigation from 1893 to 1897. During his period on Blake, he developed the Sigsbee sounding machine, which became a standard item of deep-water oceanographic equipment for the next 50 years.

Sigsbee served at the Naval Academy from 1869 to 1871, from 1882 to 1885, and from 1887 to 1890. He served on the Board of Control for the United States Naval Institute. He commanded Kearsarge on the European station from 1885 to 1886 and the training ship Portsmouth from 1891 to 1892.

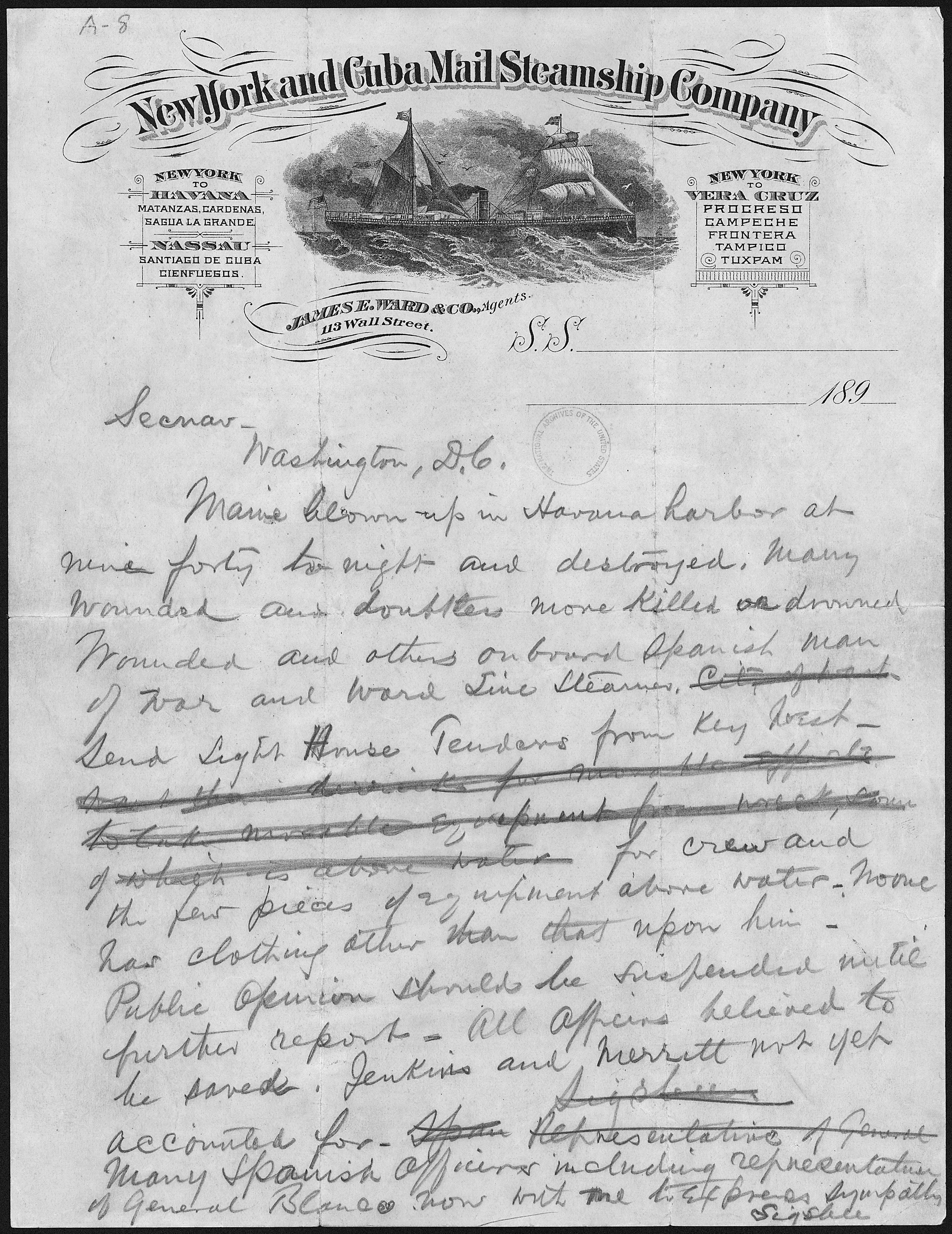
A telegram from Sigsbee to Secretary of the Navy John Davis Long on the destruction of USS Maine

Sigsbee took command of the armored cruiser Maine in April 1897. After Maine was destroyed in February 1898, Sigsbee and his officers were exonerated by a court of inquiry. He then commanded St. Paul in 1898 at the Second Battle of San Juan and Texas until 1900.

In February, he was appointed Chief Intelligence Officer of the Office of Naval Intelligence, succeeding Commander Richardson Clover. He held that post until April 1903 when he was succeeded by Commander Seaton Schroeder. He was promoted to rear admiral on 10 August 1903.

He assumed command of the South Atlantic Squadron in 1904 and the Second Division, North Atlantic Squadron, in 1905.

He commanded USS Brooklyn as his flagship on June 7, 1905, which sailed for Cherbourg, France. There, the remains of the late John Paul Jones were taken aboard and brought home for his interment at the United States Naval Academy.

== Death and legacy ==
Sigsbee retired from the Navy in 1907 and died in New York, 1923. He is buried in Arlington National Cemetery. His grandson, Charles Dwight Sigsbee III, First Lieutenant, US Army, was buried near to him on July 10, 1956.

Conscious of his legacy, Sigsbee penned a book giving the history of the Maine and his experiences aboard her. The book was entitled The MAINE - An Account of Her Destruction in Havana Harbor and was published by the Century Company of New York in 1899.

His daughter Mary Ellen Sigsbee (1877–1960) was an artist, socialist and feminist.

He has several namesakes:

- The destroyer USS Sigsbee (DD-502) was named for him.
- Sigsbee Park, the primary military family housing area for Naval Air Station Key West, and the collocated Sigsbee Elementary School are named in his honor.
- Sigsbee Deep, the deepest part of the Gulf of Mexico, was discovered by ships under his command and was named in his honor.
- On May 25, 1898, Daniel Bevill was appointed postmaster of a new post office in Shelby County, Missouri, but needed a name for the office. Bevill had so admired Sigsbee, a naval officer in command of the battleship Maine, which blew up in Havana Harbor in 1898, that he named the post office site as Sigsbee (Shelby County Historical Society records).

== Ranks held ==
- Midshipman – September 27, 1859
- Passed Midshipman – 1863
- Master – May 10, 1866
- Commodore - Jan 4, 1867

Ensign	Lieutenant junior grade	Lieutenant	Lieutenant commander	Commander	Captain	Commodore	Rear admiral
O-1	O-2	O-3	O-4	O-5	O-6	O-7	O-8
October 3, 1863	Never Held	April 21, 1867	March 12, 1868	May 11, 1882	March 21, 1897	Unknown	August 10, 1903

Preceded by Richardson Clover	Head of the Office of Naval Intelligence (Chief Intelligence Officer); February 1900 – April 1903	Succeeded by Seaton Schroeder
