= Food Additives Amendment of 1958 =

Health legislation

- Long title: An Act to protect the public health by amending the Federal Food, Drug, and Cosmetic Act to prohibit the use in food of additives which have not been adequately tested to establish their safety.
- Nicknames: Delaney clause (referring to part of the amendment)
- Enacted by: the 85th United States Congress
- Effective: September 6, 1958

Citations
- Public law: 85-929
- Statutes at Large: 72 Stat. 1784 aka 72 Stat. 1786

Codification
- Titles amended: 21 U.S.C.: Food and Drugs
- U.S.C. sections amended: 21 U.S.C. ch. 9, subch. II § 321; 21 U.S.C. ch. 9, subch. IV § 341 et seq.

Legislative history
- Introduced in the House as H.R. 13254; Signed into law by President Dwight Eisenhower (R) on September 6, 1958

The Food Additives Amendment of 1958 is a 1958 amendment to the United States' Food, Drugs, and Cosmetic Act of 1938. It was a response to concerns about the safety of new food additives. The amendment established an exemption from the "food additive" definition and requirements for substances "generally recognized as safe" by scientific experts in the field, based on long history of use before 1958 or based on scientific studies. New food additives would be subject to testing including by the "Delaney clause". The Delaney clause was a provision in the amendment which said that if a substance were found to cause cancer in man or animal, then it could not be used as a food additive.

== "Generally recognized as safe" ==
Generally recognized as safe (GRAS) is a Food and Drug Administration (FDA) designation that a chemical or substance added to food is considered safe by experts, and so is exempted from the usual Federal Food, Drug, and Cosmetic Act (FFDCA) food additive tolerance requirements. The concept of food additives being "generally recognized as safe" was first described in the Food Additives Amendment of 1958, and all additives introduced after this time had to be evaluated by new standards.

== Delaney Clause ==
The Delaney Clause is a provision in the amendment named after Congressman James Delaney of New York. It said:

the Secretary of the Food and Drug Administration shall not approve for use in food any chemical additive found to induce cancer in man, or, after tests, found to induce cancer in animals.

The Delaney Clause applied to pesticides in processed foods, but only when the concentration of a residue of a cancer-causing pesticide increased during processing; for example when more of a pesticide was present in ketchup than in the raw tomatoes used to make it. (It never applied to pesticides in raw foods.) When the law was passed, "neither advocates nor opponents of the policy, including FDA officials, believed it would have broad application, for only a handful of chemicals had then been shown to be animal carcinogens."

The Delaney Clause was invoked in 1959 when Arthur Sherwood Flemming, the Secretary of the Department of Health, Education and Welfare issued a statement advising the public about the possible contamination of substantial quantities of cranberries in Oregon and Washington with the herbicide aminotriazole, which the FDA had recently determined was a carcinogen (see Cranberry scare of 1959). Taking place the week of Thanksgiving, the announcement was referred to by many in the cranberry industry as "Black Monday" − sales plummeted, even though many government officials attempted to defuse the scare by declaring their intention to eat cranberries anyway. This episode is regarded as one of the first modern food scares based on a chemical additive.

As analytical chemistry became more powerful and able to detect smaller quantities of chemicals, and as chemicals became more widely used, regulatory agencies had an increasingly difficult time administering the Delaney Clause as it "recognizes no distinctions based on carcinogenic potency and, at least in theory, it applies equally to additives used in large amounts and to those present at barely detectable levels. It thus takes no account of the actual risk a carcinogenic additive might pose."

The FDA was the first agency to have to confront this problem, with respect to the use of diethylstilbestrol to promote the growth of livestock used in meat production, which remained present in the meat. It addressed the issue by using quantitative risk assessment, declaring that if a carcinogenic food additive creates an excess lifetime cancer risk of less than 1 additional cancer case in every 1,000,000 exposed individuals, the risk is negligible. This standard became known as the "de minimis" exception to the Delaney Rule and was used throughout the FDA and other agencies.

In 1988 the United States Environmental Protection Agency eased restrictions on several pesticides which posed a "de minimis" risk to humans. This change was challenged by the Natural Resources Defense Council, and overturned in 1992 by the Ninth Circuit Court of Appeals.

Pesticide use was removed from the Delaney Clause in 1996 by an amendment to Title IV of the Food Quality Protection Act of 1996 (P.L. 104-170, Sec. 404).

The Delaney prohibition appears in three separate parts of the FFDCA: Section 409 on food additives; Section 512, relating to animal drugs in meat and poultry; and Section 721 on color additives. The Section 409 prohibition applied to many pesticide residues until enactment of the Food Quality Protection Act of 1996. This legislation removed pesticide residue tolerances from Delaney Clause constraints.

Many foods contain natural substances which are carcinogenic, for example safrole, which occurs in sassafras and sweet basil. Even these substances are covered by the Delaney clause, so that, for example, safrole may not be added to root beer in the United States.

== See also ==
- Precautionary principle
