= List of executive actions by Dwight D. Eisenhower =

There are various kinds of executive actions that United States presidents may take.

Executive orders are issued to help officers and agencies of the executive branch manage the operations within the federal government itself. Presidential memoranda are closely related, and have the force of law on the Executive Branch, but are generally considered less prestigious. Presidential memoranda do not have an established process for issuance, and unlike executive orders, they are not numbered. A presidential determination is a determination resulting in an official policy or position of the executive branch of the United States government. A presidential proclamation is a statement issued by a president on a matter of public policy issued under specific authority granted to the president by Congress and typically on a matter of widespread interest. Administrative orders are signed documents such as notices, letters, and orders that can be issued to conduct administrative operations of the federal government. A presidential notice or a presidential sequestration order can also be issued. National security directives^{1} operate like executive orders, but are only in the area of national security. They have been issued by different presidents under various names.

Listed below are executive orders numbered 10432–10913 signed by United States President Dwight D. Eisenhower (1953–1961). He issued 484 executive orders. His executive orders are also listed on Wikisource, along with his presidential proclamations.

Signature of Dwight D. Eisenhower

== Executive orders ==
=== 1953 ===
Relative No.	Absolute No.	Title/Description	Date signed
1	10432	Establishing the President's Advisory Committee on Government Organization	January 24, 1953
2	10433	Further Providing for the Administration of the Defense Production Act of 1950, as Amended	February 4, 1953
3	10434	Suspension of Wage and Salary Controls Under the Defense Production Act of 1950, as Amended	February 6, 1953
4	10435	Inspection of Income, Excess-Profits, Declared Value Excess-Profits, Capital Stock, Estate, and Gift Tax Returns by the Senate Committee on Government Operations	February 6, 1953
5	10436	Reserving Kahoolawe Island, Territory of Hawaii, for the Use of the United States for Naval Purposes and Placing it Under the Jurisdiction of the Secretary of the Navy	February 20, 1953
6	10437	Designating the Honorable Benjamin Ortiz To Act, Under Certain Circumstances, as Judge of the United States District Court for the District of Puerto Rico During the Year 1953	February 20, 1953
7	10438	Transferring Certain Functions of the National Security Resources Board and of the Chairman Thereof to the Director of Defense Mobilization	March 13, 1953
8	10439	Amendment of Executive Order No. 10163 of September 25, 1950, Establishing the Armed Forces Reserve Medal	March 19, 1953
9	10440	Amendment of Civil Service Rule VI	March 31, 1953
10	10441	Continuing in Effect Certain Appointments as Officers and Warrant Officers of the Army and the Air Force	March 31, 1953
11	10442	Inspection of Income, Excess-Profits, Declared Value Excess-Profits, Capital Stock, Estate, and Gift Tax Returns by the Senate Committee on Interstate and Foreign Commerce	March 31, 1953
12	10443	Suspension of the Eight-Hour Law as to Laborers and Mechanics Employed by the Atomic Energy Commission on Public Work Essential to the National Defense	April 7, 1953
13	10444	Amendment of Executive Order No. 8809 of June 28, 1941, Establishing the Good Conduct Medal, as Amended by Executive Order No. 9323 of March 31, 1943	April 10, 1953
14	10445	Reserving Certain Lands Acquired Under Title III of the Bankhead-Jones Farm Tenant Act as Parts of National Forests	April 10, 1953
15	10446	Specification of Laws From Which the Escapee Program Administered by the Department of State Shall Be Exempt	April 17, 1953
16	10447	Inspection of Returns by Senate Committee on the Judiciary	April 22, 1953
17	10448	Establishing the National Defense Service Medal	April 22, 1953
18	10449	Creating an Emergency Board To Investigate a Dispute Between the New York, Chicago, & St. Louis Railroad Company and Certain of its Employees	April 24, 1953
19	10450	Security Requirements for Government Employment	April 27, 1953
20	10451	Inspection of Certain Returns by the Committee on the Judiciary, House of Representatives	April 28, 1953
21	10452	Providing for the Performance by the Chairman of the Civil Service Commission of Certain Functions Relating to Personnel Management	May 1, 1953
22	10453	Restoring Certain Lands Comprising Portions of the Fort Ruger Military Reservation to the Jurisdiction of the Territory of Hawaii	May 18, 1953
23	10454	Restoring Certain Lands of the Schofield Barracks Military Reservation to the Jurisdiction of the Territory of Hawaii	May 18, 1953
24	10455	Inspection of Income, Excess-Profits, Declared Value Excess-Profits, Capital Stock, Estate, and Gift Tax Returns by the Committee on Government Operations, House of Representatives	May 22, 1953
25	10456	Delegating to Secretary of Defense and the Director of Defense Mobilization Certain Functions Relating to Critical Defense Housing Areas	May 27, 1953
26	10457	Designating the Department of Justice as a Defense Agency for Certain Purposes	May 27, 1953
27	10458	Providing for the Administration of Certain Foreign Aid Programs and Related Activities	June 1, 1953
28	10459	Amendment of Executive Order No. 10422 of January 9, 1953, Prescribing Procedures for Making Available to the Secretary General of the United Nations Certain Information Concerning United States Citizens Employed or Being Considered for Employment on the Secretariat of the United Nations	June 2, 1953
29	10460	Providing for the Performance by the Director of Defense Mobilization of Certain Functions Relating to Telecommunications	June 16, 1953
30	10461	Delegating and Transferring Certain Functions and Affairs to the Office of Defense Mobilization Provided for in Reorganization Plan No. 3 of 1953	June 17, 1953
31	10462	Delegation of Certain Functions of the President to the Housing and Home Finance Administrator	June 19, 1953
32	10463	Amendment of Section 6.4 of Civil Service Rule VI	June 25, 1953
33	10464	Delegation of Functions of the President Respecting the Transfer of Wheat to Pakistan	June 25, 1953
34	10465	Suspension of Certain Provisions of the Officer Personnel Act of 1947, as Amended, Which Relate to Officers of the Marine Corps	June 30, 1953
35	10466	Continuing in Effect Certain Appointments as Commissioned Officers and Warrant Officers of the Army and of the Air Force	June 30, 1953
36	10467	Further Providing for the Administration of the Defense Production Act of 1950, as Amended	June 30, 1953
37	10468	Appointment of William C. Strand, Director, Office of Territories, Department of the Interior, as Administrator of the Puerto Rico Reconstruction Administration	July 7, 1953
38	10469	Amending the Selective Service Regulations	July 11, 1953
39	10470	Amending Executive Order No. 10408, Transferring the Administration of a Certain Portion of the Trust Territory of the Pacific Islands From the Secretary of the Interior to the Secretary of the Navy	July 17, 1953
40	10471	Authorizing the Heads of Departments and Agencies To Grant Leaves of Absence to Certain Persons	July 17, 1953
41	10472	Establishing the National Agricultural Advisory Commission	July 20, 1953
42	10473	Amendment of the Foreign Service Regulations Relating to United States Foreign Service Fees	July 22, 1953
43	10474	The Honorable Robert A. Taft	July 31, 1953
44	10475	Administration of the Housing and Rent Act of 1947, as Amended	July 31, 1953
45	10476	Administration of Foreign Aid and Foreign Information Functions	August 1, 1953
46	10477	Authorizing the Director of the United States Information Agency To Exercise Certain Authority Available by Law to the Secretary of State and the Director of the Foreign Operations Administration	August 1, 1953
47	10478	Delegating to the Secretary of Defense the Authority of the President To Order Certain Members of Reserve Components of the Armed Forces Into Active Federal Service and To Prescribe Regulations Governing the Appointment, Reappointment, and Promotion of Such Members	August 5, 1953
48	10479	Establishing the Government Contract Committee	August 13, 1953
49	10480	Further Providing for the Administration of the Defense Mobilization Program	August 14, 1953
50	10481	Designation of Certain Officers of the Department of Agriculture To Act as Secretary of Agriculture	August 15, 1953
51	10482	Providing for an Additional Member of the Government Contract Committee	August 15, 1953
52	10483	Establishing the Operations Coordinating Board	September 2, 1953
53	10484	Providing for the Administration of the President's Management Improvement Fund	September 3, 1953
54	10485	Providing for the Performance of Certain Functions Heretofore Performed by the President With Respect to Electric Power and Natural Gas Facilities Located on the Borders of the United States	September 3, 1953
55	10486	Providing for the Establishment of the Advisory Committee on Government Housing Policies and Programs	September 12, 1953
56	10487	Providing for the Administration of the Refugee Relief Act of 1953	September 16, 1953
57	10488	Providing for the Issuance of Regulations Governing the Purchase, Custody, Transfer, or Sale of Foreign Exchange by the United States	September 23, 1953
58	10489	Providing for the Administration of Certain Loan and Loan Guarantee Functions Under the Defense Production Act of 1950, as amended	September 26, 1953
59	10490	Creating a Board of Inquiry To Report on Certain Labor Disputes Affecting the Maritime Industry of the United States	October 1, 1953
60	10491	Amendment of Executive Order No. 10450 of April 27, 1953, Relating to Security Requirements for Government Employment	October 13, 1953
61	10492	Establishing a Seal for the National Advisory Committee for Aeronautics	October 14, 1953
62	10493	Delegating Certain Functions of the President to the Administrator of the Small Business Administration	October 14, 1953
63	10494	Disposition of Functions Remaining Under Title IV of the Defense Production Act	October 14, 1953
64	10495	Prescribing the Order of Succession of Officers To Act as Secretary of Defense, Secretary of the Army, Secretary of the Navy, and Secretary of the Air Force	October 14, 1953
65	10496	Restoring Certain Lands Reserved for Military Purposes to the Jurisdiction of the Territory of Hawaii	October 14, 1953
66	10497	Amendment of the Regulations Relating to Commissioned Officers and Employees of the Public Health Service	October 27, 1953
67	10498	Delegating to the Secretaries of the Military Departments and the Secretary of the Treasury Certain Authority Vested in the President by the Uniform Code of Military Justice	November 4, 1953
68	10499	Delegating Functions Conferred Upon the President by Section 8 of the Uniformed Services Contingency Option Act of 1953	November 4, 1953
69	10500	Designation of the Power Authority of the State of New York and Establishment of the United States Section of the St. Lawrence River Joint Board of Engineers	November 4, 1953
70	10501	Safeguarding Official Information in the Interests of the Defense of the United States	November 5, 1953
71	10502	Suspending Certain Statutory Provisions Relating to Employment in the Canal Zone	December 1, 1953
72	10503	Amendment of Executive Order No. 10011, as Amended, Authorizing the Secretary of State To Exercise Certain Powers of the President With Respect to the Granting of Allowances and Allotments to	December 1, 1953
73	10504	Transferring Certain Functions, Powers, and Duties to the Small Business Administration	December 1, 1953
74	10505	Amending the Selective Service Regulations	December 10, 1953
75	10506	Delegating Certain Functions of the President Under the Public Health Service Act	December 10, 1953
76	10507	Further Amendment of Executive Order No. 9805, Prescribing Regulations Governing Payment of Certain Travel and Transportation Expenses	December 10, 1953
77	10508	Excusing Federal Employees From Duty One-Half Day on December 24, 1953, and One-Half Day on December 31, 1953	December 14, 1953
78	10509	Creating an Emergency Board To Investigate a Dispute Between the Railway Express Agency, Inc., and Certain of its Employees	December 16, 1953
79	10510	Establishing a Seal for the Department of Health, Education, and Welfare	December 17, 1953
80	10511	Creating an Emergency Board To Investigate Disputes Between the Akron, Canton and Youngstown Railroad Company and Other Carriers and Certain of Their Employees	December 28, 1953

=== 1954 ===
Relative No.	Absolute No.	Title/Description	Date signed
81	10512	Revocation of Executive Order No. 9047, Exempting Certain Officers and Employees of the Government From Automatic Separation From the Service	January 19, 1954
82	10513	Designating Certain Officers To Act as Secretary of Labor	January 19, 1954
83	10514	Revocation of Executive Order No. 2414 of June 30, 1916	January 19, 1954
84	10515	Amendment of Executive Order No. 10739 of August 2, 1952, Suspending the Operation of Certain Provisions of the Officer Personnel Act of 1947 Applicable to the Retirement of Colonels of the	January 22, 1954
85	10516	Transferring Certain Lands to the Secretary of Agriculture for Use, Administration, and Disposition Under Title III of the Bankhead-Jones Farm Tenant Act	January 26, 1954
86	10517	Designating the Honorable A. Cecil Snyder to Act, Under Certain Circumstances, as Judge of the United States District Court for the District of Puerto Rico During the Year 1954	February 10, 1954
87	10518	Inspection of Returns by the Special Committee of the House of Representatives Authorized by House Resolution 217, 83d Congress, to Investigate Tax-Exempt Foundations	February 11, 1954
88	10519	Specification of Laws From Which Functions Authorized by Mutual Security Act of 1951, as Amended, Shall be Exempt	March 5, 1954
89	10520	Transferring Certain Lands From the Department of Agriculture to the Department of the Army	March 10, 1954
90	10521	Administration of Scientific Research by Agencies of the Federal Government	March 17, 1954
91	10522	Authorizing the Director of the United States Information Agency to Carry Out Certain functions of the Board of the Foreign Service	March 26, 1954
92	10523	Designating March 31, 1954, as the Day For Dedication of the Memorial to Major General George W. Goethals and Excusing Federal Employees on the Isthmus of Panama From Duty on That Day	March 26, 1954
93	10524	Delegating Certain Functions of the President Respecting School-Construction Assistance	March 31, 1954
94	10525	Transferring From the Secretary of the Navy to the Secretary of the Interior Interest in and Control Over Certain Funds	April 1, 1954
95	10526	Transferring Certain Lands in Mississippi From the Department of Agriculture to the Department of the Army	April 17, 1954
96	10527	Inspection of Income, Excess-Profits, Declared Value Excess-Profits, Capital Stock, Estate, and Gift Tax Returns by the Senate Committee on Banking and Currency	April 19, 1954
97	10528	Addition of the Marginal Wharf Area to Sand Island Military Reservation, Territory of Hawaii	April 22, 1954
98	10529	Participation by Federal Employees in State and Local Civil Defense Pre-Emergency Training Programs	April 22, 1954
99	10530	Providing for the Performance of Certain Functions Vested in or Subject to the Approval of the President	May 10, 1954
100	10531	Amendment of Executive Order No. 10450 of April 27, 1953, as Amended, Relating to Security Requirements for Government Employment	May 27, 1954
101	10532	Amendment of the List of Communicable Diseases Contained in Executive Order No. 9708 of March 26, 1946	May 28, 1954
102	10533	Designating the Organization of American States as a Public International Organization Entitled To Enjoy Certain Privileges, Exemptions, and Immunities	June 3, 1954
103	10534	Providing for the Supervision and Direction of the Saint Lawrence Seaway Development Corporation	June 9, 1954
104	10535	Authorizing the Civil Service Commission To Confer a Competitive Status Upon Persons Who Failed To Acquire Such Status Under Certain Executive Orders Because of Administrative Error	June 9, 1954
105	10536	Authorizing Certain Functions of Heads of Departments and Agencies Under Section 16 of the Federal Airport Act To Be Performed Without the Approval of the President	June 9, 1954
106	10537	Amending Executive Orders Nos. 10219 and 10480 With Respect to the Designation of a Commissioner of the Interstate Commerce Commission To Perform Certain Functions	June 22, 1954
107	10538	Establishing a Seal for the United States Marine Corps	June 22, 1954
108	10539	Providing for the Administration of Functions Respecting Rubber, Tin, and Abaca Heretofore Administered by the Reconstruction Finance Corporation	June 22, 1954
109	10540	Designating Certain Officers of the Government to Which the Annual and Sick Leave Act of 1951, as Amended Shall Not Apply, and Delegating the Authority To Make Such Designations to the Chairman of	June 29, 1954
110	10541	Further Extension of the Existence of Quetico-Superior Committee	June 30, 1954
111	10542	Creating a Board of Inquiry To Report on a Labor Dispute Affecting the Operations of Atomic Energy Facilities	July 6, 1954
112	10543	Creating a Board of Inquiry To Report on a Labor Dispute Affecting the Operations of Atomic Energy Facilities	July 6, 1954
113	10544	Inspection of Income Tax Returns by Federal Trade Commission	July 12, 1954
114	10545	Amendment of Executive Order No. 5952 of November 23, 1932, Prescribing the Army Ration	July 15, 1954
115	10546	Suspension of Certain Provisions of the Officer Personnel Act of 1947, as Amended, Which Relate to Officers of the Marine Corps of the Grades of First Lieutenant and Captain	July 16, 1954
116	10547	Inspection of Statistical Transcript Cards by the Board of Governors of the Federal Reserve System	July 27, 1954
117	10548	Amendment of Executive Order No. 10450 of April 27, 1953, Relating to Security Requirements for Government Employment	August 2, 1954
118	10549	Providing for the Placing of Positions in the Department of Defense in Grades 16, 17, and 18 of the General Schedule of the Classification Act of 1949	August 2, 1954
119	10550	Amendment of Executive Order No. 10450 of April 27, 1953, Relating to Security Requirements for Government Employment	August 5, 1954
120	10551	Inspection of Income, Excess-Profits, Declared Value Excess-Profits, Capital Stock, Estate, and Gift Tax Returns by the Committee on Education and Labor of the House of Representatives	August 6, 1954
121	10552	Delegating to the Civil Service Commission the Authority of the President To Promulgate Regulations Under Which Certain Government Employees May Be Prevented or Relieved From Working by Administrative	August 10, 1954
122	10553	Amending Executive Order No. 10539 With Respect to the Administration of the Abaca Production Act of 1950	August 18, 1954
123	10554	Delegating the Authority of the President To Prescribe Regulations Authorizing Occasions Upon Which the Uniform May Be Worn by Persons Who Have Served Honorably in the Armed Forces in Time of War	August 18, 1954
124	10555	Establishing a Seal for the President's Committee on Employment of the Physically Handicapped	August 23, 1954
125	10556	Authorizing Regulations for the Permanent Promotion and Reassignment of Federal Employees	September 1, 1954
126	10557	Approving the Revised Provision in Government Contracts Relating to Nondiscrimination in Employment	September 3, 1954
127	10558	Amendment of Executive Order No. 10154, Designating Certain Officers of the Post Office Department To Act as Postmaster General	September 8, 1954
128	10559	Providing for the Administration of the President's Management Improvement Appropriation	September 8, 1954
129	10560	Administration of the Agricultural Trade Development and Assistance Act of 1954	September 9, 1954
130	10561	Designating Official Personnel Folders in Government Agencies as Records of the Civil Service Commission and Prescribing Regulations Relating to the Establishment, Maintenance, and Transfer	September 13, 1954
131	10562	Amending the Selective Service Regulations	September 20, 1954
132	10563	Revocation of Executive Order No. 10266 of June 30, 1951, Suspending Certain Provisions of the Officer Personnel Act of 1947, as Amended	September 25, 1954
133	10564	Inspection of Income, Excess-Profits, Declared Value Excess-Profits, Capital Stock, Estate, and Gift Tax Returns by the Subcommittee of the Committee on the Judiciary of the House of Representatives	September 28, 1954
134	10565	Amendment of Paragraphs 76a and 127c of the Manual for Courts-Martial, United States, 1951	September 28, 1954
135	10566	Amendment of Executive Order No. 10455, Authorizing the Inspection of Certain Tax Returns	September 29, 1954
136	10567	Further Designation Pursuant to Section 103(a) of the Renegotiation Act of 1951	September 29, 1954
137	10568	Suspending Certain Statutory Provisions Relating to Employment in the Canal Zone	October 1, 1954
138	10569	Amendment of Executive Order No. 10334 of March 26, 1952, Exempting Frederick C. Mayer From Compulsory Retirement for Age	October 5, 1954
139	10570	Creating an Emergency Board To Investigate a Dispute Between the Pullman Company and Certain of Its Employees	October 16, 1954
140	10571	Including Certain Lands in the Nantahala National Forest	October 18, 1954
141	10571-A	Assignment of Frequencies to Government Radio Stations	October 26, 1954
142	10572	Inspection of Income, Excess-Profits, Declared-Value Excess-Profits, Capital Stock, Estate, and Gift Tax Returns by the Senate Committee on Labor and Public Welfare	October 26, 1954
143	10573	Amending Executive Order No. 10530 To Authorize the Housing and Home Finance Administrator To Exercise Certain Authority of the President	October 26, 1954
144	10574	Amendment of Executive Order No. 10480 Providing for the Administration of the Defense Mobilization Program	November 5, 1954
145	10575	Administration of Foreign-Aid Functions	November 6, 1954
146	10576	Creating an Emergency Board To Investigate a Dispute Between the Capital Airlines, Inc., National Airlines, Inc., Northwest Airlines, Inc., Trans World Airlines, Inc., United Airlines, Inc., Eastern	November 16, 1954
147	10577	Amending the Civil Service Rules and Authorizing a New Appointment System for the Competitive Service	November 22, 1954
148	10578	Creating an Emergency Board To Investigate a Dispute Between Certain Carriers Represented by the Eastern, Western, and Southeastern Carriers' Conference Committees and Certain of Their Employees	November 23, 1954
149	10579	Regulations Relating to the Establishment and Operation of Interagency Motor-Vehicle Pools and Systems	November 30, 1954
150	10580	Excusing Federal Employees From Duty on December 24, and for One-Half Day on December 31, 1954	December 4, 1954
151	10581	Approving a Seal for the Saint Lawrence Seaway Development Corporation	December 10, 1954
152	10582	Prescribing Uniform Procedures for Certain Determinations Under the Buy-American Act	December 17, 1954
153	10583	Amendment to Executive Order No. 10289, Relating to the Performance of Certain Functions Affecting the Department of the Treasury	December 18, 1954
154	10584	Prescribing Rules and Regulations Relating to the Administration of the Watershed Protection and Flood Prevention Act	December 18, 1954

=== 1955 ===
Relative No.	Absolute No.	Title/Description	Date signed
155	10585	Designating the Date of Termination of Combatant Activities in Korea and Waters Adjacent Thereto	January 1, 1955
156	10586	Designating Certain Officers To Act as Secretary of the Treasury	January 13, 1955
157	10587	Administration of Section 32(h) of the Trading With the Enemy Act	January 13, 1955
158	10588	Establishing the President's Commission on Veterans' Pensions	January 14, 1955
159	10589	Amendment of Executive Order No. 6783 of June 30, 1934, Creating the Quetico-Superior Committee	January 15, 1955
160	10590	Establishing the President's Committee on Government Employment Policy	January 18, 1955
161	10591	Waiving the Age Requirements To Permit Otto K. Olesen To Compete in the Competitive Civil-Service Examination for the Position of Postmaster at Los Angeles, California	January 20, 1955
162	10592	Amendment of Executive Order No. 10524 of March 31, 1954, Delegating Certain Functions of the President Respecting School-Construction Assistance	January 21, 1955
163	10593	Amending Executive Order No. 10296, as Amended, To Authorize the Director of the Office of Defense Mobilization To Perform Additional Functions of the President	January 27, 1955
164	10594	Amending the Selective Service Regulations	January 31, 955
165	10595	Amendment of Executive Order No. 9746 of July 1, 1946, Relating to the Panama Canal and the Canal Zone	February 7, 1955
166	10596	Revocation of Executive Order No. 9908 of December 5, 1947	February 15, 1955
167	10597	Providing for the Restoration of Certain Lands to Kaakaukukui, Honolulu, Hawaii, to the Jurisdiction of the Territory of Hawaii and Transfer of Title Thereto to the Territory	February 15, 1955
168	10598	Amending Executive Order No. 10483, Establishing the Operations Coordinating Board	February 28, 1955
169	10599	Designating the Honorable A. Cecil Snyder To Act, Under Certain Circumstances, as Judge of the United States District Court for the District of Puerto Rico During the Year 1955	March 15, 1955
170	10600	Amending Executive Order No. 9260 of October 29, 1942, Entitled "Legion of Merit"	March 15, 1955
171	10601	Administration of Commodity Set-Aside	March 21, 1955
172	10602	Designating the Secretary of the Interior as the Representative of the President To Approve the Obligation and Expenditure of Certain Moneys by the Government of the Virgin Islands	March 23, 1955
173	10603	Amendment of Executive Order No. 10309, Providing for the Restoration of Possession, Use, and Control of Certain Lands Reserved for Military Purposes to the Territory of Hawaii and Transfer of Title to	April 19, 1955
174	10604	Delegating to the Director of the Bureau of the Budget the Authority of the President To Approve Regulations Relating to the Operation of Vending Stands on Federal Property by Blind Persons	April 22, 1955
175	10605	Amendment of Executive Order No. 10119 of March 27, 1950, Prescribing Regulations Governing the Payment of Basic Allowances for Subsistence to Members of the Uniformed Services	April 22, 1955
176	10606	Inspection of Income, Excess-Profits, Declared-Value Excess-Profits, Capital-Stock, Estate, and Gift Tax Returns by the Senate Committee on Government Operations	May 3, 1955
177	10607	Inspection of Income, Excess-Profits, Declared-Value Excess-Profits, Capital-Stock, Estate, and Gift Tax Returns by the Committee on Government Operations, House of Representatives	May 3, 1955
178	10608	United States Authority and Functions in Germany	May 5, 1955
179	10609	Delegating to the Secretary of State Authority To Appoint Alternate United States Commissioners to the Caribbean Commission	May 7, 1955
180	10610	Administration of Mutual Security and Related Functions	May 9, 1955
181	10611	Establishing the Civil Defense Coordinating Board and Defining its Duties	May 11, 1955
182	10612	Restoring Certain Lands Reserved for Military Purposes to the Jurisdiction of the Territory of Hawaii	May 11, 1955
183	10613	Amendment of Executive Order No. 10393 of September 4, 1952, Establishing the Clemency and Parole Board for War Criminals	May 16, 1955
184	10614	Regulations Governing the Payment of General-Average Contributions in Connection With the Transportation of Certain Baggage and Household Goods and Effects of Military and Civilian Personnel	May 25, 1955
185	10615	Creating an Emergency Board To Investigate a Dispute Between Certain Carriers Represented by the Eastern, Western, and Southeastern Carriers' Conference Committees and Certain of Their Employees	June 17, 1955
186	10616	Suspension of Certain Provisions of the Officer Personnel Act of 1947, as Amended, Which Relates to Officers of the Marine Corps of the Grade of Brigadier General	June 21, 1955
187	10617	Suspension of the Operation of Certain Provisions of the Officer Personnel Act of 1947 Applicable to the Retirement of Colonels of the Regular Army	June 28, 1955
188	10618	Amendment of Executive Order No. 10152, Prescribing Regulations Relating to the Right of Members of the Uniformed Services to Incentive Pay for the Performance of Hazardous Duty Required by Competent	June 28, 1955
189	10619	Inspection of Individual Income Tax Returns by the Department of Health, Education, and Welfare	June 29, 1955
190	10620	Inspection of Income, Excess-Profits, Declared-Value Excess-Profits, Capital-Stock, Estate, and Gift Tax Returns by the Senate Committee on the Judiciary	July 1, 1955
191	10621	Delegation of Certain Functions of the President to the Secretary of Defense	July 1, 1955
192	10622	Creating an Emergency Board To Investigate a Dispute Between the Railway Express Agency, Inc., and Certain of Its Employees	July 1, 1955
193	10623	Amendment of Certain Provisions of Executive Orders No. 10000 and No. 10011, as Amended, Pertaining to Salary Differentials and Allowances for Officers and Employees of the Foreign Service Serving	July 23, 1955
194	10624	Regulations Relating to Personnel of the Department of Agriculture Assigned to Service Abroad	July 28, 1955
195	10625	Further Providing for the Administration of Foreign Aid Functions	August 2, 1955
196	10626	Establishment of the Interdepartmental Committee for Voluntary Payroll Savings Plan for the Purchase of United States Savings Bonds	August 4, 1955
197	10627	Inspection of Income, Excess-Profits, Declared-Value Excess-Profits, Capital-Stock, Estate, and Gift Tax Returns by the Committee on Un-American Activities, House of Representatives	August 5, 1955
198	10628	Restoring Limitations Upon Punishments for Violations of Articles 82, 85, 86(3), 87, 90, 91(1) and (2), 113, and 115 of the Uniform Code of Military Justice	August 5, 1955
199	10629	Authorizing Enlistments in the Ready Reserve of the Army Reserve and Marine Corps Reserve	August 13, 1955
200	10630	Creating an Emergency Board To Investigate a Dispute Between the New York Central System, Lines East, and Certain of Its Employees	August 13, 1955
201	10631	Code of Conduct for Members of the Armed Forces of the United States	August 17, 1955
202	10632	Suspension of Certain Provisions of the Officer Personnel Act of 1947, as Amended, Which Relate to the Promotion of Officers of the Medical Corps and Dental Corps of the Navy	August 19, 1955
203	10633	Establishing an Airspace Reservation Over the Las Vegas Project, Las Vegas, Nevada	August 19, 1955
204	10634	Providing for Loans To Aid in the Reconstruction, Rehabilitation and Replacement of Facilities Which Are Destroyed or Damaged by a Major Disaster and Which Are Required for National Defense	August 25, 1955
205	10635	Creating an Emergency Board to Investigate a Dispute Between the Pennsylvania Railroad and Certain of its Employees	September 1, 1955
206	10636	Amendment of Executive Order No. 10000 of September 16, 1948, Prescribing Regulations Governing Additional Compensation and Credit Granted Certain Employees of the Federal Government Serving	September 16, 1955
207	10637	Delegating to the Secretary of the Treasury Certain Functions of the President Relating to the United States Coast Guard	September 16, 1955
208	10638	Authorizing the Director of the Office of Defense Mobilization To Order the Release of Strategic and Critical Materials From Stock Piles in the Event of an Attack Upon the United States	October 10, 1955
209	10639	Amendment of the Tariff of United States Foreign Service Fees	October 10, 1955
210	10640	The President's Committee on Employment of the Physically Handicapped	October 10, 1955
211	10641	Amending the Civil Service Rules by Adding Rule VIII - Appointments to Overseas Positions	October 26, 1955
212	10642	Suspending Certain Statutory Provisions Relating to Employment in the Canal Zone	October 26, 1955
213	10643	Creating an Emergency Board To Investigate Disputes Between the Albany Port District Railroad and Other Carriers and Certain of Their Employees	November 7, 1955
214	10644	Administration of Title II of the International Claims Settlement Act of 1949, as Amended, Relating to the Vesting and Liquidation of Bulgarian, Hungarian, and Romanian Property	November 7, 1955
215	10645	Amendment of Executive Order No. 9 of January 17, 1873, To Permit an Officer or Employee of the Federal Government To Hold the Office of Member of the State Board of Agriculture of the State of	November 22, 1955
216	10646	Designating the Secretary of Defense To Coordinate and Facilitate Actions Required To Discharge Federal Responsibilities Under the Federal Voting Assistance Act of 1955	November 22, 1955
217	10647	Providing for the Appointment of Certain Persons Under the Defense Production Act of 1950, as Amended	November 28, 1955
218	10648	Restoring Certain Lands Comprising Portions of the Fort Ruger Military Reservation to the Jurisdiction of the Territory of Hawaii	December 8, 1955
219	10649	Amendment of Executive Order No. 10153 Prescribing Regulations Relating to Certain Travel Time of Members of the Uniformed Services Called to Active Duty in Excess of Thirty Days	December 28, 1955

=== 1956 ===
Relative No.	Absolute No.	Title/Description	Date signed
220	10650	Prescribing Regulations Governing the Selection of Certain Persons Who Have Critical Skills for Enlistment in Units of the Ready Reserve of the Armed Forces	January 6, 1956
221	10651	Providing for the Screening of the Ready Reserve of the Armed Forces Established Under the Provisions of Part II of the Armed Forces Reserve Act of 1952, as Amended	January 6, 1956
222	10652	Amendment of Paragraph 126e of the Manual for Courts-Martial, United States, 1951	January 10, 1956
223	10653	Designating the Honorable A. Cecil Snyder To Act, Under Certain Circumstances, as Judge of the United States District Court for the District of Puerto Rico During the Year 1956	January 6, 1956
224	10654	Delegating Certain Functions of the President to the Director of the Bureau of the Budget	January 20, 1956
225	10655	Air Coordinating Committee	January 28, 1956
226	10656	Establishing the President's Board of Consultants on Foreign Intelligence Activities	February 6, 1956
227	10657	Transferring to the Housing and Home Finance Administrator Certain Functions of the Atomic Energy Commission Under the Atomic Energy Community Act of 1955	February 14, 1956
228	10658	Amendment of Executive Order No. 10478 of August 5, 1953, Delegating Certain Authority of the President to the Secretary of Defense	February 15, 1956
229	10659	Amending the Selective Service Regulations	February 15, 1956
230	10660	Providing for the Establishment of a National Defense Executive Reserve	February 15, 1956
231	10661	Delegating to Certain Officers of the Government the Authority Vested in the President To Designate Persons From Foreign Countries Who May Be Permitted To Receive Instruction at the Military, Naval,	February 27, 1956
232	10662	Amendment of Executive Order No. 10480 and Revocation of Executive Order No. 10160, Relating to the Administration of the Defense Production Act of 1950	March 13, 1956
233	10663	Administration of the Escapee Program	March 24, 1956
234	10664	Restoring Certain Lands Comprising Portions of the Waianae-Kai Military Reservation to the Jurisdiction of the Territory of Hawaii	April 2, 1956
235	10665	Restoring Certain Lands of the Schofield Barracks Military Reservation to the Jurisdiction of the Territory of Hawaii	April 23, 1956
236	10666	Restoring Certain Land at Humuula, North Hilo, Hawaii, to the Possession, Use, and Control of the Territory of Hawaii	April 27, 1956
237	10667	Amendment of Executive Order No. 10629, Authorizing Enlistments in the Ready Reserve of the Army Reserve and Marine Corps Reserve, To Authorize Enlistments in the Naval and Coast Guard Reserves	May 9, 1956
238	10668	Amendment of Executive Order No. 2859, of May 11, 1918, Relating to the National Research Council	May 10, 1956
239	10669	Amendment of Executive Order No. 10495, Prescribing the Order of Succession of Officers To Act as Secretary of Defense, Secretary of the Army, Secretary of the Navy, and Secretary of the Air Force	May 18, 1956
240	10670	Establishing a Flag for the United States Army	June 12, 1956
241	10671	Fleet Admiral Ernest J. King	June 26, 1956
242	10672	Withholding of District of Columbia Income Taxes by Federal Agencies	July 9, 1956
243	10673	Fitness of American Youth	July 16, 1956
244	10674	Exempting Certain Officers and Employees in the Executive Branch of the Government From Automatic Separation From the Service	July 31, 1956
245	10675	Amendment of Section 203 of Executive Order 10577 of November 22, 1954, Providing for the Conversion of Certain Career-Conditional Appointments to Career Appointments	August 21, 1956
246	10676	Designating the World Meteorological Organization as a Public International Organization Entitled To Enjoy Certain Privileges, Exemptions, and Immunities	September 1, 1956
247	10677	Amendment of Executive Order 10629, as Amended, To Authorize Enlistments in the Ready Reserve of the Air Force Reserve	September 1, 1956
248	10678	Administration of the Functions of the Rubber Producing Facilities Disposal Commission	September 20, 1956
249	10679	Withholding of Compensation of Certain Civilian Employees of the Army National Guard and the Air National Guard for State Employee Retirement System Purposes	September 20, 1956
250	10680	Designating the International Finance Corporation as a Public International Organization Entitled To Enjoy Certain Privileges, Exemptions, and Immunities	October 2, 1946
251	10681	Amendment of Executive Order No. 10152, Prescribing Regulations Relating to Incentive Pay for the Performance of Hazardous Duty	October 22, 1956
252	10682	Amendment of Section 2(c) of Executive Order 10530, Delegating to the Civil Service Commission the Authority of the President To Exempt Certain Employees From Automatic Separation From the Service	October 22, 1956
253	10683	Including Certain Lands in the Cherokee National Forest	October 26, 1956
254	10684	Including Certain Lands in the Cherokee National Forest	October 26, 1956
255	10685	Providing for the Administration of the Agricultural Trade Development and Assistance Act of 1954, as Amended	October 27, 1956
256	10686	Designating Certain Officers of the Post Office Department To Act as Postmaster General	November 1, 1956
257	10687	Suspension of a Portion of Section 5762(a) of Title 10 of the United States Code Relating to the Recommendation of Officers for Promotion to Certain Grades	November 16, 1956
258	10688	Restoring Certain Lands Comprising Portions of the Waianae-Kai Military Reservation to the Jurisdiction of the Territory of Hawaii	November 16, 1956
259	10689	Creating a Board of Inquiry To Report on Certain Labor Disputes Affecting the Maritime Industry of the United States	November 22, 1956
260	10690	Suspension of Compliance With Certain Statutory Provisions Relating to Employment in the Canal Zone	November 23, 1956
261	10691	Creating an Emergency Board To Investigate a Dispute Between the Spokane, Portland & Seattle Railway Company and Certain of Its Employees Represented by the Brotherhood of Locomotive Engineers	December 5, 1956
262	10692	Amendment of Executive Order No. 9080, To Provide for the Designation of Members of the Joint Mexican-United States Defense Commission by the Secretary of Defense	December 22, 1956
263	10693	Creating an Emergency Board To Investigate Disputes Between the Akron & Barberton Belt Railroad and Other Carriers and Certain of Their Employees	December 22, 1956

=== 1957 ===
Relative No.	Absolute No.	Title/Description	Date signed
264	10694	Authorizing the Secretaries of the Army, Navy, and Air Force To Issue Citations in the Name of the President of the United States to Military and Naval Units for Outstanding Performance in Action	January 10, 1957
265	10695	Revoking Paragraph 2(b) of Executive Order No. 10096 of January 23, 1950, Entitled "Providing for a Uniform Patent Policy for the Government With Respect to Inventions Made by Government Employees and"	January 16, 1957
266	10695-A	Radio Frequencies	January 16, 1957
267	10696	Creating an Emergency Board To Investigate a Dispute Between the Railway Express Agency, Incorporated, and Certain of Its Employees Represented by the International Brotherhood of Teamsters,	January 25, 1957
268	10697	Tariff of United States Foreign Service Fees	February 6, 1957
269	10698	Amendment of Executive Order No. 10648, Restoring Certain Portions of the Fort Ruger Military Reservation to the Jurisdiction of the Territory of Hawaii	February 8, 1957
270	10699	Inspection of Income, Excess-Profits, Declared-Value Excess-Profits, Capital-Stock, Estate, and Gift Tax Returns by the Senate Committee on Government Operations	February 19, 1957
271	10700	Further Providing for the Operations Coordinating Board	February 25, 1957
272	10701	Inspection of Income, Excess-Profits, Declared-Value Excess-Profits, Capital-Stock, Estate, and Gift Tax Returns by the Committee on Un-American Activities, House of Representatives	March 12, 1957
273	10702	Rear Admiral Richard E. Byer	March 12, 1957
274	10703	Inspection of Income, Excess-Profits, Declared-Value Excess-Profits, Capital-Stock, Estate, and Gift Tax Returns by the Select Committee of the Senate Established by Senate Resolution 74, 85th Congress, To Investigate Improper Activities in Labor-Management Relations, and for Other Purposes	March 17, 1957
275	10704	Change in Membership of the President's Council on Youth Fitness	March 25, 1957
276	10705	Delegations of Certain Authority of the President Relating to Radio Stations and Communications	April 17, 1957
277	10706	Inspection of Income, Excess-Profits, Declared-Value Excess-Profits, Capital-Stock, Estate, and Gift Tax Returns by the Senate Committee on the Judiciary	April 25, 1957
278	10707	Establishing a Seal for the United States Coast Guard	May 0, 1957
279	10708	Further Providing for the Administration of the Agricultural Trade Development and Assistance Act of 1954, as Amended	May 6, 1957
280	10709	Creating an Emergency Board To Investigate a Dispute Between the Toledo, Lorain & Fairport Dock Company, the Toledo Lakefront Dock Company, and the Cleveland Stevedore Company, and Certain of Their	May 9, 1957
281	10710	Creating a Board of Inquiry To Report on a Labor Dispute Affecting the Operations of Atomic Energy Facilities	May 14, 1957
282	10711	Restoring Certain Lands Comprising Portions of the Lualualei Military Reservation to the Jurisdiction of the Territory of Hawaii	May 14, 1957
283	10712	Inspection of Income, Excess-Profits, Declared-Value Excess-Profits, Capital-Stock, Estate, and Gift Tax Returns by the Senate Committee on the Judiciary	May 17, 1957
284	10713	Providing for the Administration of the Ryukyu Islands	June 5, 1957
285	10714	Amending the Selective Service Regulations	June 13, 1957
286	10715	Revoking Executive Order No. 9775 of September 3, 1946	June 17, 1957
287	10716	Administration of the International Cultural Exchange and Trade Fair Participation Act of 1956	June 17, 1957
288	10717	The President's Award for Distinguished Federal Civilian Service	June 27, 1957
289	10718	Delegating to the Secretary of State Authority To Prescribe the Rates or Tariffs of Fees for Official Services at United States Embassies, Legations, and Consulates	June 27, 1957
290	10719	Restoring Certain Lands of the Schofield Barracks Military Reservation to the Jurisdiction of the Territory of Hawaii	July 3, 1957
291	10720	Amendment of Executive Order No. 10678, Placing Certain Matters Under the Administration or Jurisdiction of the Federal Facilities Corporation	July 11, 1957
292	10721	The Honorable Walter F. George	August 5, 1957
293	10722	Amendment of Executive Order No. 10590, Establishing the President's Committee on Government Employment Policy	August 5, 1957
294	10723	Creating an Emergency Board To Investigate a Dispute Between the General Managers' Association of New York Representing the New York Central Railroad, New York Central Railroad Company, Brooklyn Eastern District Terminal, Jay Street Connecting Railroad, New York Dock Railway, Bush Terminal Railroad, Baltimore & Ohio Railroad Company, the Pennsylvania Railroad, Erie Railroad Company, Reading Company, Delaware, Lackawanna & Western Railroad, and the Central Railroad Company of New	August 6, 1957
295	10724	Establishing a Career Executive Committee	August 12, 1957
296	10725	Suspension of the Provision of Section 5751(b) of Title 10, United States Code, Which Relates to Officers of the Marine Corps of the Grade of Captain	August 16, 1957
297	10726	Suspension of Compliance With Certain Statutory Provisions Relating to Employment in the Canal Zone	August 16, 1957
298	10727	Designating the Preparatory Commission of the International Atomic Energy Agency, the International Atomic Energy Agency, and the Universal Postal Union as Public International Organizations Entitled To Enjoy Certain Privileges, Exemptions, and Immunities	August 31, 1957
299	10728	Establishing the President's Committee on Fund-Raising Within the Federal Service	September 6, 1957
300	10729	Special Assistant to the President for Personnel Management	September 16, 1957
301	10730	Providing Assistance for the Removal of an Obstruction of Justice Within the State of Arkansas	September 24, 1957
302	10731	Delegating to the Director of the Bureau of the Budget the Authority of the President To Transfer Certain Records, Property, and Personnel	October 10, 1957
303	10732	Amendment of Executive Order No. 10250, Providing for the Performance of Certain Functions of the President by the Secretary of the Interior	October 10, 1957
304	10733	Providing for an Additional Member and for an Executive Vice Chairman of the Government Contract Committee	October 10, 1957
305	10734	Amendment of Executive Order No. 10657, Relating to the Transfer to the Housing and Home Finance Administrator of Certain Functions Under the Atomic Energy Community Act of 1955	October 17, 1957
306	10735	Amending the Selective Service Regulations	October 17, 1957
307	10736	Adopting an Official Seal for the Department of the Navy	October 23, 1957
308	10737	Further Providing for the Administration of Disaster Relief	October 29, 1957
309	10738	Inspection of Estate and Gift Tax Returns by State Tax Officials	November 15, 1957
310	10739	Amendment of Executive Order No. 10152, Prescribing Regulations Relating to Incentive Pay for the Performance of Hazardous Duty by Members of the Uniformed Services	November 15, 1957
311	10740	Change in the Membership of the President's Council on Youth Fitness	November 21, 1957
312	10741	Establishing the Trade Policy Committee	November 25, 1957
313	10742	Further Providing for the Administration of Foreign-Aid Functions	November 29, 1957
314	10743	Sale of Vessels of the Navy	December 10, 1957
315	10744	Excusing Federal Employees From Duty for One-Half Day on December 24, and One-Half Day on December 31, 1957	December 10, 1957
316	10745	Amendment of Section 203 of Executive Order No. 10577 of November 22, 1954, as Amended, Providing for the Conversion of Certain Career-Conditional Appointments to Career Appointments	December 12, 1957
317	10746	Further Providing for the Administration of the Agricultural Trade Development and Assistance Act of 1954, as Amended	December 12, 1957
318	10747	Designating the Secretary of State To Act for the United States in Certain Matters Pertaining to Japanese War Criminals	December 31, 1957

=== 1958 ===
Relative No.	Absolute No.	Title/Description	Date signed
319	10748	Appointing the Honorable Edward I. P. Tatelman To Act as Special Judge of the United States District Court for the District of the Canal Zone in a Certain Case	January 1, 1958
320	10749	Creating an Emergency Board To Investigate a Dispute Between the Eastern Air Lines, Inc., and Certain of its Employees	January 21, 1958
321	10750	Creating an Emergency Board To Investigate a Dispute Between the Eastern Air Lines, Inc., and Certain of its Employees	January 28, 1958
322	10751	Amendment of Executive Order No. 10127, Establishing Airspace Reservations Over Certain Facilities of the United States Atomic Energy Commission	February 11, 1958
323	10752	Designating the Secretary of the Interior To Execute Certain Powers and Functions Vested in the President by the Act of February 22, 1935, 49 Stat. 30, as Amended	February 12, 1958
324	10753	Designation of Certain Officers of the Department of the Interior To Act as Secretary of the Interior	February 15, 1958
325	10754	Amendment of Executive Order No. 10655, Relating to the Air Coordinating Committee	February 22, 1958
326	10755	Transferring From the Department of the Navy to the Housing and Home Financing Agency, Subject to Reservation of Mineral Rights, Certain Land Located Within Naval Petroleum Reserve No. 2	February 22, 1958
327	10756	The Honorable Frederick M. Dearborn, Jr.	February 26, 1958
328	10757	Creating an Emergency Board To Investigate a Dispute Between Eastern Air Lines, Inc., Trans World Airlines, Inc., United Air Lines, Inc., Northwest Airlines, Inc., Northeast Airlines, Inc., Capital Airlines, Inc., and National Airlines, Inc., and Certain of Their Employees	February 27, 1958
329	10758	Establishing a Career Executive Program Within the Civil Service System	March 4, 1958
330	10759	Amendment of Executive Order No. 10530, Providing for the Performance of Certain Functions Vested in or Subject to Approval of the President	March 17, 1958
331	10760	Creating an Emergency Board To Investigate a Dispute Between the Trans World Airlines, Inc., and Certain of its Employees	March 27, 1958
332	10761	Government Purchases of Crude Petroleum and Petroleum Products	March 27, 1958
333	10762	Delegating to the Secretary of Defense the Authority of the President To Order to Active Duty Members of the Reserve Components of the Armed Forces Who Are in Medical, Dental, or Allied Specialist Categories and To Prescribe Regulations Governing the Appointment, Reappointment, and Promotion of	March 28, 1958
334	10763	Amendment of Executive Order No. 10422, as Amended, Prescribing Procedures for Making Available to the Secretary General of the United Nations Certain Information Concerning United States Citizens Employed or Being Considered for Employment on the Secretariat of the United Nations	April 23, 1958
335	10764	Suspension of the Eight-Hour Law as to Laborers and Mechanics Employed by the Civil Aeronautics Administration on Public Work Essential to the National Defense	April 23, 1958
336	10765	Regulations Governing the Award of Life-Saving Medals Under the Medals of Honor Act	April 24, 1958
337	10766	Delegating to the Director of the Bureau of the Budget the Authority of the President To Approve Regulations Relating to the Rental of Substandard Housing for Members of the Uniformed Services	May 1, 1958
338	10767	Further Extension of the Existence of the Quetico-Superior Committee	May 9, 1958
339	10768	Termination of the Airspace Reservation Established by Executive Order No. 7138 Over a Portion of the Aleutian Islands, Alaska	May 16, 1958
340	10769	Designating the International Hydrographic Bureau as a Public International Organization Entitled To Enjoy Certain Privileges, Exemptions, and Immunities	May 29, 1958
341	10770	Creating an Emergency Board To Investigate a Dispute Between American Airlines, Incorporated, and Certain of its Employees Represented by the Air Line Pilots Association, International	June 19, 1958
342	10771	Amendment of Executive Order No. 10534, Relating to the Supervision and Direction of the Saint Lawrence Seaway Development Corporation	June 20, 1958
343	10772	Amendment of Executive Order No. 10673 Relating to the Fitness of American Youth	June 30, 1958
344	10773	Delegating and Transferring Certain Functions and Affairs to the Office of Defense and Civilian Mobilization	July 1, 1958
345	10774	Providing for the Protection of the Civil-Service Rights of Federal Personnel Who Transfer to the International Atomic Energy Agency	July 25, 1958
346	10775	Amendment of Executive Order No. 10633, Establishing an Airspace Reservation Over the Las Vegas Project, Las Vegas, Nevada	July 25, 1958
347	10776	Delegating to the Secretary of Defense Certain Authority of the President Relating to the Modification of Standards and Requirements With Respect to the Induction of Persons Into the Armed	July 28, 1958
348	10777	Amending Executive Order No. 10758 To Increase the Membership of the Career Executive Board	August 6, 1958
349	10778	Authorizing the Appointment of William K. Harris to a Competitive Position Without Compliance With the Civil Service Act and Rules	August 20, 1958
350	10779	Directing Federal Agencies To Cooperate With State and Local Authorities in Preventing Pollution of the Atmosphere	August 20, 1958
351	10780	Suspension of Certain Provisions of Section 5762(a), Title 10, United States Code, Which Relate to Promotion of Officers of Supply Corps, Chaplain Corps, Civil Engineer Corps, and Medical Service	September 2, 1958
352	10781	Suspension of Certain Provisions of Section 5764(a), Title 10, United States Code, Which Relate to Establishment of Zones for Promotion of Male Officers of the Navy	September 2, 1958
353	10782	Amending Executive Order No. 10773 of July 1, 1958, Relating to Civil and Defense Mobilization	September 6, 1958
354	10783	Transferring Certain Functions From the Department of Defense to the National Aeronautics and Space Administration	October 1, 1958
355	10784	Specification of Laws From Which Functions Authorized by Mutual Security Act of 1954, as Amended, Shall Be Exempt	October 1, 1958
356	10785	Change in the Membership of the President's Council on Youth Fitness	October 17, 1958
357	10786	Transferring Functions of the Airways Modernization Board to the Administrator of the Federal Aviation Agency	November 1, 1958
358	10787	Transferring Jurisdiction Over Certain Lands From the Department of Agriculture to the Department of the Interior, for Use, Administration, or Exchange Under the Taylor Grazing Act and Other Statutes	November 6, 1958
359	10788	Suspension of Compliance With Certain Statutory Provisions Relating to Employment in Canal Zone	November 14, 1958
360	10789	Authorizing Agencies of the Government To Exercise Certain Contracting Authority in Connection With National-Defense Functions and Prescribing Regulations Governing the Exercise of Such Authority	November 14, 1958
361	10790	Amendment of Executive Order No. 10530, Providing for the Performance of Certain Functions Vested in or Subject to the Approval of the President	November 20, 1958
362	10791	Designating Certain Officers To Act as Secretary of State	November 28, 1958
363	10792	Excusing Federal Employees From Duty All Day on December 26, 1958	November 28, 1958
364	10793	Transferring Certain Functions From the Department of Defense to the National Aeronautics and Space Administration	December 3, 1958
365	10794	Establishing the Canal Zone Merit System and Prescribing Regulations Relating to Conditions of Employment in the Canal Zone	December 10, 1958
366	10795	Designating the Intergovernmental Maritime Consultative Organization as a Public International Organization Entitled To Enjoy Certain Privileges, Exemptions, and Immunities	December 13, 1958
367	10796	Amendment of Executive Order No. 10655 Relating to the Air Coordinating Committee	December 24, 1958
368	10797	Delegating to the Director of the Bureau of the Budget Certain Authority Vested in the President by the Federal Aviation Act of 1958	December 24, 1958

=== 1959 ===
Relative No.	Absolute No.	Title/Description	Date signed
369	10798	Flag of the United States	January 3, 1959
370	10799	Providing Further for the Administration of the Agricultural Trade Development and Assistance Act of 1954, as Amended	January 15, 1959
371	10800	Implementing the Government Employees Training Act	January 15, 1959
372	10801	Amendment of Executive Order No. 10703, Authorizing the Inspection of Certain Tax Returns	January 21, 1959
373	10802	Establishing the Committee on Government Activities Affecting Prices and Costs	January 23, 1959
374	10803	Providing for the Terms of Office of the Members of the International Development Advisory Board	February 2, 1959
375	10804	Delegating to the Civil Service Commission the Authority of the President To Prescribe Regulations Under the Federal Employees International Organization Service Act	February 12, 1959
376	10805	Designating the Central Intelligence Agency as Excepted From Certain Provisions of the Government Employees Training Act	February 18, 1959
377	10806	Inspection of Income, Excess-Profits, Estate, and Gift Tax Returns by the Senate Committee on Government Operations	March 10, 1959
378	10807	Federal Council for Science and Technology	March 13, 1959
379	10808	Inspection of Income, Excess-Profits, Declared-Value Excess-Profits, Capital-Stock, Estate, and Gift Tax Returns by the Senate Committee on the Judiciary	March 19, 1959
380	10809	Amending the Selective Service Regulations	March 19, 1959
381	10810	Regulations Governing the Allowance of Travel Expenses of Claimants and Beneficiaries of the Veterans' Administration and Their Attendants	April 22, 1959
382	10811	Creating an Emergency Board To Investigate a Dispute Between Pan American World Airways, Inc., and Certain of its Employees	April 22, 1959
383	10812	Establishing a Flag for the United States Navy	April 24, 1959
384	10813	Including Certain Lands in the Chattahoochee National Forest and the Nantahala National Forest	April 29, 1959
385	10814	Inspection of Statistical Transcript Cards and Corporation and Individual Income Tax Returns by the Securities and Exchange Commission	April 29, 1959
386	10815	Inspection of Income, Excess-Profits, Estate, and Gift Tax Returns by the Committee on Un-American Activities, House of Representatives	April 29, 1959
387	10816	Amendment of Executive Order No. 10501 of November 5, 1953, Relating to Safeguarding Official Information in the Interests of the Defense of the United States	May 7, 1959
388	10817	The Honorable Donald A. Quarles	May 8, 1959
389	10818	Inspection of Income, Excess-Profits, Estate, and Gift Tax Returns by the Committee on Government Operations, House of Representatives	May 8, 1959
390	10819	Amendment of Executive Order No. 10480, as Amended, Relating to the Defense Mobilization Program	May 8, 1959
391	10820	Prescribing the Order of Succession of Officers To Act as Secretary of Defense, Secretary of the Army, Secretary of the Navy, and Secretary of the Air Force	May 18, 1959
392	10821	Amendment of Executive Order No. 10168 of October 11, 1950, Prescribing Regulations Relating to the Right of Enlisted Members of the Uniformed Services to Additional Pay for Sea and Foreign Duty	May 20, 1959
393	10822	Further Providing for the Administration of Foreign-Aid Functions	May 20, 1959
394	10823	Coat of Arms, Seal, and Flag of the President of the United States	May 26, 1959
395	10824	Designating the National Aeronautics and Space Administration as an Agency To Have Certain Contractual Authority Under the Assignment of Claims Act of 1940, as Amended	May 29, 1959
396	10825	Excusing Federal Employees From Duty All Day on July 3, 1959	June 12, 1959
397	10826	Authorizing the Civil Service Commission To Confer Benefits in Certain Cases	June 25, 1959
398	10827	Further Providing for the Administration of the Agricultural Trade Development and Assistance Act of 1954, as Amended	June 25, 1959
399	10828	Designating the Airport Being Constructed in the Counties of Fairfax and Loudoun in the State of Virginia as the Dulles International Airport	July 15, 1959
400	10829	Fleet Admiral William D. Leahy	July 20, 1959
401	10830	Establishing a Seal for the President's Council on Youth Fitness	July 24, 1959
402	10831	Establishing the Federal Radiation Council	August 14, 1959
403	10832	Revocation of EO 9887, Designating Certain Public International Organizations Entitled To Enjoy Certain Privileges, Exemptions, and Immunities	August 18, 1959
404	10833	Transferring Title to Certain Lands at Sand Island, Territory of Hawaii, to the Territory of Hawaii	August 20, 1959
405	10834	The Flag of the United States	August 21, 1959
406	10835	Delegating to the Chairman of the Civil Service Commission the Authority of the President To Make Certain Determinations Relating to the Payment of Presidential Awards	August 21, 1959
407	10836	Amendment of Executive Order No. 10530, Providing for the Performance of Certain Functions Vested in or Subject to the Approval of the President	September 8, 1959
408	10837	Amending the Selective Service Regulations	September 14, 1959
409	10838	Further Amendment of Executive Order 10700, as Amended, Providing for the Operations Coordinating Board	September 16, 1959
410	10839	Designating Certain Officers To Act as Secretary of State	September 30, 1959
411	10840	Designating the Federal Aviation Agency as an Agency To Have Certain Contractual Authority Under the Assignment of Claims Act of 1940, as Amended	September 30, 1959
412	10841	Providing for the Carrying Out of Certain Provisions of the Atomic Energy Act of 1954, as Amended, Relating to International Cooperation	September 30, 1959
413	10842	Creating a Board of Inquiry To Report on Certain Labor Disputes Affecting the Maritime Industry of the United States	October 6, 1959
414	10843	Creating a Board of Inquiry To Report on a Labor Dispute Affecting the Steel Industry of the United States	October 9, 1959
415	10844	Enlarging the Wasatch National Forest—Utah	October 9, 1959
416	10845	Further Specification of Laws From Which Functions Authorized by the Mutual Security Act of 1954, as Amended, Shall Be Exempt	October 12, 1959
417	10846	Inspection of Income, Excess-Profits, Estate, and Gift Tax Returns by the Senate Committee on Agriculture and Forestry	October 12, 1959
418	10847	Establishing the Committee for Rural Development Program	October 12, 1959
419	10848	Amendment of Executive Order No. 10843, Creating a Board of Inquery to report on a Labor Dispute Affecting the Steel Industry of the United States	October 14, 1959
420	10849	Establishing a Seal for the National Aeronautics and Space Administration	November 27, 1959
421	10850	Modifying the Exterior Boundaries of Certain National Forests in Alabama, Florida, Louisiana, Mississippi, North Carolina, Oklahoma, and South Carolina	November 27, 1959
422	10851	Enlarging the Chattahoochee, Kisatchie, Holly Springs, and Ouachita National Forests	November 27, 1959
423	10852	Amendment of Executive Order No. 10530, Providing for the Performance of Certain Functions Vested in or Subject to the Approval of the President	November 27, 1959
424	10853	Delegating the Authority of the President With Respect to Various Allowances to Certain Government Personnel on Foreign Duty	November 27, 1959
425	10854	Extension of the Application of the Federal Aviation Act of 1958	November 27, 1959
426	10855	Inspection of Income Tax Returns by the Senate Committee on the Judiciary	November 27, 1959
427	10856	Excusing Federal Employees From Duty One-Half Day on December 24, 1959	December 3, 1959
428	10857	Determining the Termination of Certain Federal Functions in Alaska and Delegating to the Secretary of the Interior the Authority of the President To Transfer to Alaska Property Owned or Held by the	December 29, 1959

=== 1960 ===
Relative No.	Absolute No.	Title/Description	Date signed
429	10858	The President's Committee for Traffic Safety	January 13, 1960
430	10859	Revocation of Executive Order 10758 Establishing a Career Executive Program Within the Civil Service System, and Executive Order 10777, Amending Executive Order 10758	February 5, 1960
431	10860	Coat of Arms, Seal, and Flag of the President of the United States	February 5, 1960
432	10861	Suspension of Certain Provisions of Section 5762 of Title 10 of the United States Code Which Relate to the Promotion of Officers of the Supply Corps, Chaplain Corps, Civil Engineer Corps, and Medical	February 11, 1960
433	10862	Creating an Emergency Board To Investigate a Dispute Between Atchison, Topeka and Santa Fe Railway Company—Coast Lines and Certain of its Employees	February 12, 1960
434	10863	Authorizing the Attorney General To Seize Arms and Munitions of War, and Other Articles, Pursuant to Section 1 of Title VI of the Act of June 15, 1917, as Amended	February 18, 1960
435	10864	Designating the Pan American Health Organization as a Public International Organization Entitled To Enjoy Certain Privileges, Exemptions, and Immunities	February 18, 1960
436	10865	Safeguarding Classified Information Within Industry	February 20, 1960
437	10866	Designating the Southeast Asia Treaty Organization as a Public International Organization Entitled To Enjoy Certain Privileges, Exemptions, and Immunities	February 20, 1960
438	10867	Readiness of the United States District Court for the District of Alaska To Assume the Functions Imposed Upon It	February 20, 1960
439	10868	Creating an Emergency Board To Investigate a Dispute Between the New York Central System and Certain of Its Employees	February 29, 1960
440	10869	Amendment of Civil Service Rule II, as Prescribed by Executive Order No. 10577 of November 22, 1954	March 9, 1960
441	10870	Designating the Facilities of the National Aeronautics and Space Administration at Huntsville, Alabama, as the George C. Marshall Space Flight Center	March 15, 1960
442	10871	Inspection of Income, Excess-Profits, Estate, and Gift Tax returns by the House Committee on Public Works	March 15, 1960
443	10872	Creating an Emergency Board To Investigate a Dispute Between Pan American World Airways, Inc., and Certain of Its Employees	March 18, 1960
444	10873	Designating the Inter-American Development Bank as a Public International Organization Entitled To Enjoy Certain Privileges, Exemptions, and Immunities	April 8, 1960
445	10874	Creating an Emergency Board To Investigate a Dispute Between the Long Island Railroad Company and Certain of Its Employees	April 18, 1960
446	10875	Creating an Emergency Board To Investigate Disputes Between the Akron & Barberton Railroad and Other Carriers, and Certain of Their Employees	April 22, 1960
447	10876	Amendment of Executive Order 10855, Authorizing the Inspection of Certain Tax Returns	April 22, 1960
448	10877	Creating an Emergency Board To Investigate a Dispute Between the Pennsylvania Railroad Company and Certain of Its Employees	May 20, 1960
449	10878	Creating an Emergency Board To Investigate a Dispute Between the Chicago, Rock Island and Pacific Railroad Company and Other Carriers Represented by the Western Carriers' Conference Committee and	May 23, 1960
450	10879	Establishing the White House Service Certificate and the White House Service Badge	June 1, 1960
451	10880	Permitting Certain Employees To Be Given Career or Career Conditional Appointments	June 7, 1960
452	10881	Amendment of EO 10810, Prescribing Regulations Governing the Allowance of Travel Expenses of Claimants and Beneficiaries of the Veterans' Administration and Their Attendants	July 6, 1960
453	10882	Further Amendment of Executive Order No. 10289, Relating to the Performance of Certain Functions Affecting the Department of the Treasury	July 18, 1960
454	10883	Termination of the Air Coordinating Committee	August 11, 1960
455	10884	Amendment of Executive Order 10560, Providing for the Administration of the Agricultural Trade Development and Assistance Act of 1954, as Amended	August 17, 1960
456	10885	Sale of Vessels of the Navy	August 31, 1960
457	10886	Suspension of Certain Provisions of Section 5231(b) of Title 10 of the United States Code Which Relate to the Number of Officers Serving in the Grades of Admiral and Vice Admiral in the Navy	September 6, 1960
458	10887	Designating the Department of Commerce To Perform Functions With Respect to Participation of the United States in the Century 21 Exposition	September 23, 1960
459	10888	Creating an Emergency Board To Investigate a Dispute Between Certain Carriers Represented by the New York Harbor Carriers' Conference Committee and Certain of Their Employees	September 28, 1960
460	10889	Amendment of Executive Order 10530 Providing for the Performance of Certain Functions Vested in or Subject to the Approval of the President	October 5, 1960
461	10890	Including Certain Lands in the Dixie National Forest and Transferring Certain Lands From the Department of Agriculture to the Department of the Interior	October 27, 1960
462	10891	Establishing a Commission To Inquire Into a Controversy Between Certain Carriers and Certain of Their Employees	November 1, 1960
463	10892	Amendment of Executive Order 10152, Prescribing Regulations Relating to Incentive Pay for the Performance of Hazardous Duty by Members of the Uniformed Services	November 8, 1960
464	10893	Administration of Mutual Security and Related Functions	November 8, 1960
465	10894	Establishing the President's Committee on Migratory Labor	November 15, 1960
466	10895	Extension of the Provisions for Rotation of Civilian Employees of the Defense Establishment Assigned to Duty Outside the United States	November 25, 1960
467	10896	Amendment of Executive Order No. 6260 of August 28, 1933	November 29, 1960
468	10897	Authorizing the Secretary of State To Prescribe Rules and Regulations Relating to the Foreign Service Retirement and Disability System	December 2, 1960
469	10898	Establishing the Interdepartmental Highway Safety Board	December 2, 1960
470	10899	Authorization for the Communication of Restricted Data by the Central Intelligence Agency	December 9, 1960

=== 1961 ===
Relative No.	Absolute No.	Title/Description	Date signed
471	10900	Administration of the Agricultural Trade Development and Assistance Act of 1954, as Amended	January 5, 1961
472	10901	Amendment of Executive Order 10501, Relating to Safeguarding Official Information in the Interests of the Defense of the United States	January 9, 1961
473	10902	Providing for the Issuance of Emergency Preparedness Orders by the Director of the Office of Civil and Defense Mobilization	January 9, 1961
474	10903	Delegating Authority of the President With Respect to Regulations Relating to Certain Allowances and Benefits to Government Personnel on Overseas Duty	January 9, 1961
475	10904	Creating an Emergency Board To Investigate a Dispute Between Certain Carriers Represented by the New York Harbor Carriers' Conference Committee and Certain of Their Employees	January 12, 1961
476	10905	Amendment of Executive Order 6260 of August 28, 1933, as Amended	January 14, 1961
477	10906	Inspection by Certain Classes of Persons and State and Federal Government Establishments of Returns Made in Respect of Certain Taxes Imposed by the Internal Revenue Code of 1954	January 17, 1961
478	10907	Inspection by Renegotiation Board of Income Tax Returns Made Under the Internal Revenue Code of 1954	January 17, 1961
479	10908	Inspection by Federal Trade Commission of Income Tax Returns of Corporations Made Under the Internal Revenue Code of 1954	January 17, 1961
480	10909	Amendment of Executive Order 10865, Safeguarding Classified Information Within Industry	January 17, 1961
481	10910	Providing for the Design and Award of the National Medal of Science	January 17, 1961
482	10911	Inspection by Department of Commerce of Income Tax Returns Made Under the Internal Revenue Code of 1954	January 17, 1961
483	10912	Amending Executive Order 10716 of June 17, 1957	January 18, 1961
484	10913	Amending Executive Order 10584 of December 18, 1954, Prescribing Rules and Regulations Relating to the Administration of the Watershed Protection and Flood Prevention Act	January 18, 1961
