= C2H4N4 =

The molecular formula C_{2}H_{4}N_{4} (molar mass: 84.08 g/mol, exact mass: 84.0436 u) may refer to:

- 3-Amino-1,2,4-triazole (3-AT), a herbicide
- 2-Cyanoguanidine
