= Committee on Migratory Labor =

On August 26, 1954, President Dwight D. Eisenhower appointed an Interdepartmental Committee on Migratory Labor consisting of the Secretaries of Labor; Agriculture; Health, Education, and Welfare; Interior; and the Administrator of the Housing and Home Finance Administration. This Committee succeeded the Commission on Migratory Labor appointed by President Harry S. Truman in 1951. The name of the committee was changed in 1955 to the U.S. President's Committee on Migratory Labor. In November 1960 the President signed an executive order formally establishing the committee.

== Committee objectives ==
- To maintain continuing review and assessment of the needs of migrant farm workers and their families.
- To aid the various Federal agencies in mobilizing, stimulating, and coordinating more effective programs and services for migrants and in providing services to States and local areas through their constituent agencies.
- To facilitate and encourage the development of actions designed to promote improved living and working conditions of migratory workers.
- To work with the U.S. State Department and other public and non-public agencies in improving the living and working conditions of migratory workers. To these ends the committee is empowered to enlist the cooperation of Federal officials, Governors’ Committee, local committees, national civic and church groups, and employer and worker organizations.

== Agency representatives ==
- U.S. Department of Labor: James P. Mitchell and Arthur J. Goldberg (Chairmen)
- U.S. Department of Agriculture: Ezra Taft Benson and Orville L. Freeman
- U.S. Department of Health, Education, and Welfare: Marion B. Folsom, Arthur S. Flemming and Abraham Ribicoff
- U.S. Department of Interior: Fred A. Seaton and Stewart L. Udall
- HHFA: Albert M. Cole, Norman Mason and Robert C. Weaver
- Henry K. Arneson, John Walsh, and Frank A. Potter (executive directors)
