= Imidazoleglycerol-phosphate dehydratase =

imidazoleglycerol-phosphate dehydratase
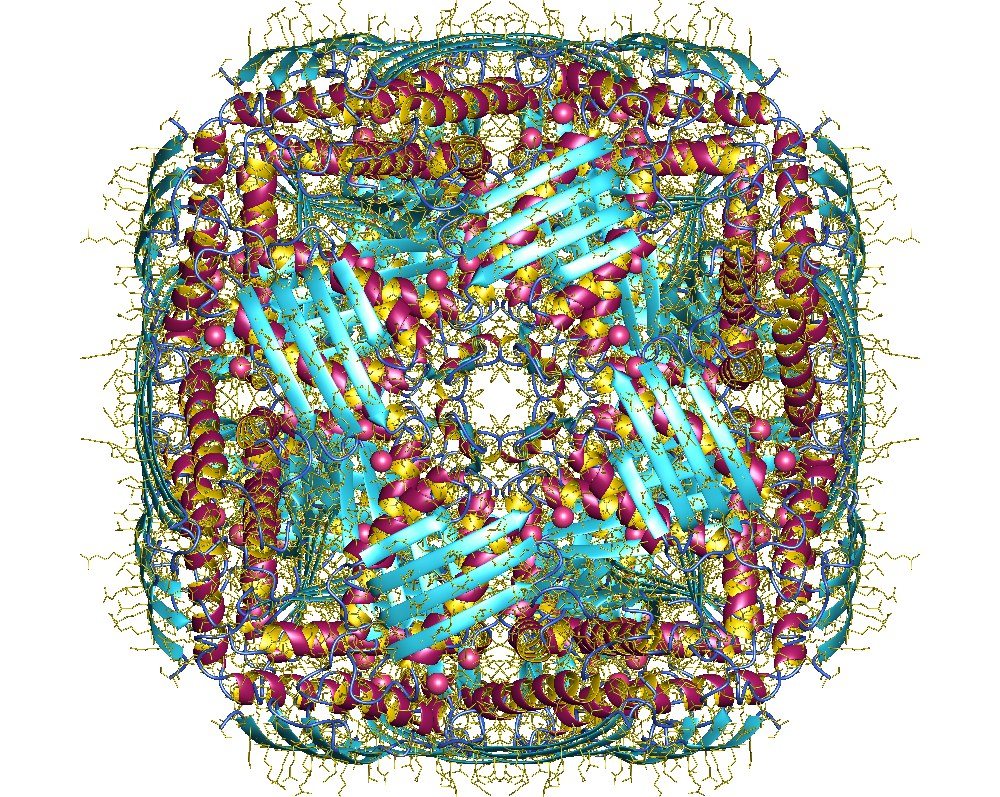

Identifiers
- EC no.: 4.2.1.19
- CAS no.: 9024-35-5

Databases
- IntEnz: IntEnz view
- BRENDA: BRENDA entry
- ExPASy: NiceZyme view
- KEGG: KEGG entry
- MetaCyc: metabolic pathway
- PRIAM: profile
- PDB structures: RCSB PDB PDBe PDBsum
- Gene Ontology: AmiGO / QuickGO
Search
- PMC: articles
- PubMed: articles
- NCBI: proteins

Imidazoleglycerol-phosphate dehydratase
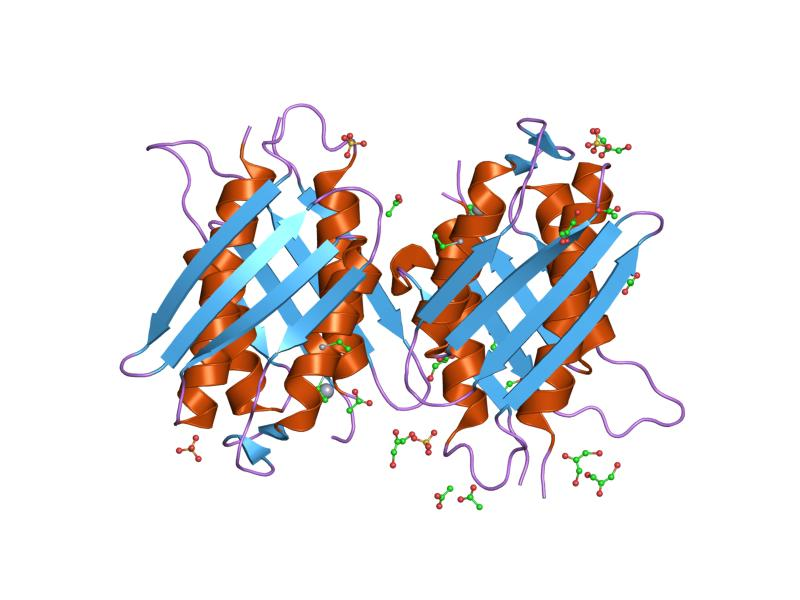
- crystal structure of imidazole glycerol phosphate dehydratase

Identifiers
- Symbol: IGPD
- Pfam: PF00475
- Pfam clan: CL0329
- InterPro: IPR000807
- PROSITE: PDOC00738
- SCOP2: 1rhy / SCOPe / SUPFAM
Available protein structures:
- PDB: IPR000807 PF00475 (ECOD; PDBsum)
- AlphaFold: IPR000807; PF00475

The enzyme imidazoleglycerol-phosphate dehydratase (EC 4.2.1.19) catalyzes the chemical reaction

D-erythro-1-(imidazol-4-yl)glycerol 3-phosphate $\rightleftharpoons$ 3-(imidazol-4-yl)-2-oxopropyl phosphate + H_{2}O

This enzyme belongs to the family of lyases, specifically the hydro-lyases, which cleave carbon-oxygen bonds. The systematic name of this enzyme class is D-erythro-1-(imidazol-4-yl)glycerol-3-phosphate hydro-lyase [3-(imidazol-4-yl)-2-oxopropyl-phosphate-forming]. Other names in common use include IGP dehydratase, and D-erythro-1-(imidazol-4-yl)glycerol 3-phosphate hydro-lyase. This enzyme participates in histidine metabolism as it is involved in the 6th step of histidine biosynthesis as part of a nine step cyclical pathway.

There are two isoforms of IGPD; IGPD1 and IGPD2. The different isoforms are highly conserved with only 8 amino acids differing between them. These subtle differences however affect their activity but as yet it is unknown how.

In most organisms IGPD is a monofunctional protein of about 22 to 29 kD. In some bacteria such as Escherichia coli, it is the C-terminal domain of a bifunctional protein that include a histidinol-phosphatase domain. In E. coli, this is the protein encoded by the hisB gene.

== Inhibition ==
Certain compounds that inhibit IGPD have been used as herbicides as animals do not have this protein. One of these inhibitors is 3-Amino-1,2,4-triazole (3-AT), which has also been used as a competitive inhibitor of the product of the yeast HIS3 gene (another IGPD), e.g. in the yeast two-hybrid system.

== Structural studies ==
As of late 2007, 3 structures have been solved for this class of enzymes, with PDB accession codes 1RHY, 2AE8, and 2F1D.
