= HisB =

The hisB gene, found in the enterobacteria (such as E. coli), in Campylobacter jejuni and in Xylella/Xanthomonas encodes a protein involved in catalysis of two step in histidine biosynthesis (the sixth and eight step), namely the bifunctional Imidazoleglycerol-phosphate dehydratase/histidinol-phosphatase.

The former function (EC 4.2.1.19), found at the N-terminal, dehydrated d-erythroimidazoleglycerolphosphate to imidazoleacetolphosphate, the latter function (EC 3.1.3.15), found at the C-terminal, dephosphorylates l-histidinolphosphate producing histidinol.

The firth step is catalysed instead by histadinolphosphate aminotransferase (encoded by hisC)

The peptide is 40.5kDa and associates to form a hexamer (unless truncated)

In E. coli hisB is found on the hisGDCBHAFI operon

The phosphatase activity possess a substrate ambiguity and overexpression of hisB can rescue phosphoserine phosphatase (serB) knockouts.

== Reactions ==
hisB-N

D-erythro-1-(imidazol-4-yl)glycerol 3-phosphate $\rightleftharpoons$ 3-(imidazol-4-yl)-2-oxopropyl phosphate + H_{2}O

hisB-C

L-histidinol phosphate + H_{2}O $\rightleftharpoons$ L-histidinol + phosphate

== Non-fusion protein in other species ==
HIS3 from Saccharomyces cerevisiae is not a fused IGP dehydratase and hisidinol phosphatase, but an IGPD only (homologous to hisB-N). Whereas HIS2 is the HP (analogous to hisB-C, called hisJ in some prokaryotes).
