= Oveta Culp Hobby =

American businesswoman and government official (1905–1995)

Oveta Hobby
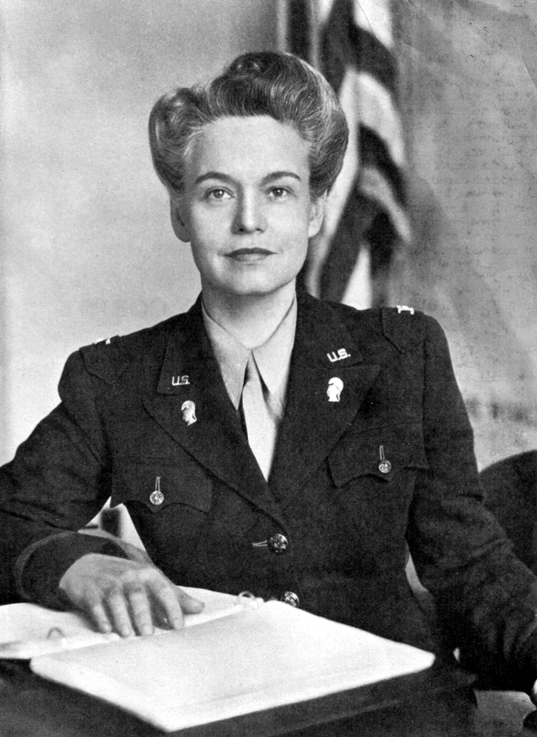
- Hobby, c. 1942

1st United States Secretary of Health, Education, and Welfare
- In office April 11, 1953 – July 31, 1955
- President: Dwight D. Eisenhower
- Preceded by: Herself (Federal Security Agency Administrator)
- Succeeded by: Marion B. Folsom

4th Administrator of the Federal Security Agency
- In office January 20, 1953 – April 11, 1953
- President: Dwight D. Eisenhower
- Preceded by: Oscar Ewing
- Succeeded by: Herself (Health, Education and Welfare Secretary)

Personal details
- Born: Oveta Culp; January 19, 1905 Killeen, Texas, U.S.
- Died: August 16, 1995 (aged 90) Houston, Texas, U.S.
- Party: Democratic (before 1953); Republican (1953–1995)
- Spouse: William P. Hobby (m. 1931; died 1964)
- Children: 2, including William Jr.
- Education: University of Mary Hardin (attended); South Texas College of Law (attended); University of Texas, Austin (attended)

Military service
- Allegiance: United States
- Branch/service: United States Army
- Years of service: 1941–1945
- Rank: Colonel
- Commands: Women's Army Auxiliary Corps (later the Women's Army Corps)
- Battles/wars: World War II
- Awards: Army Distinguished Service Medal; National Women's Hall of Fame

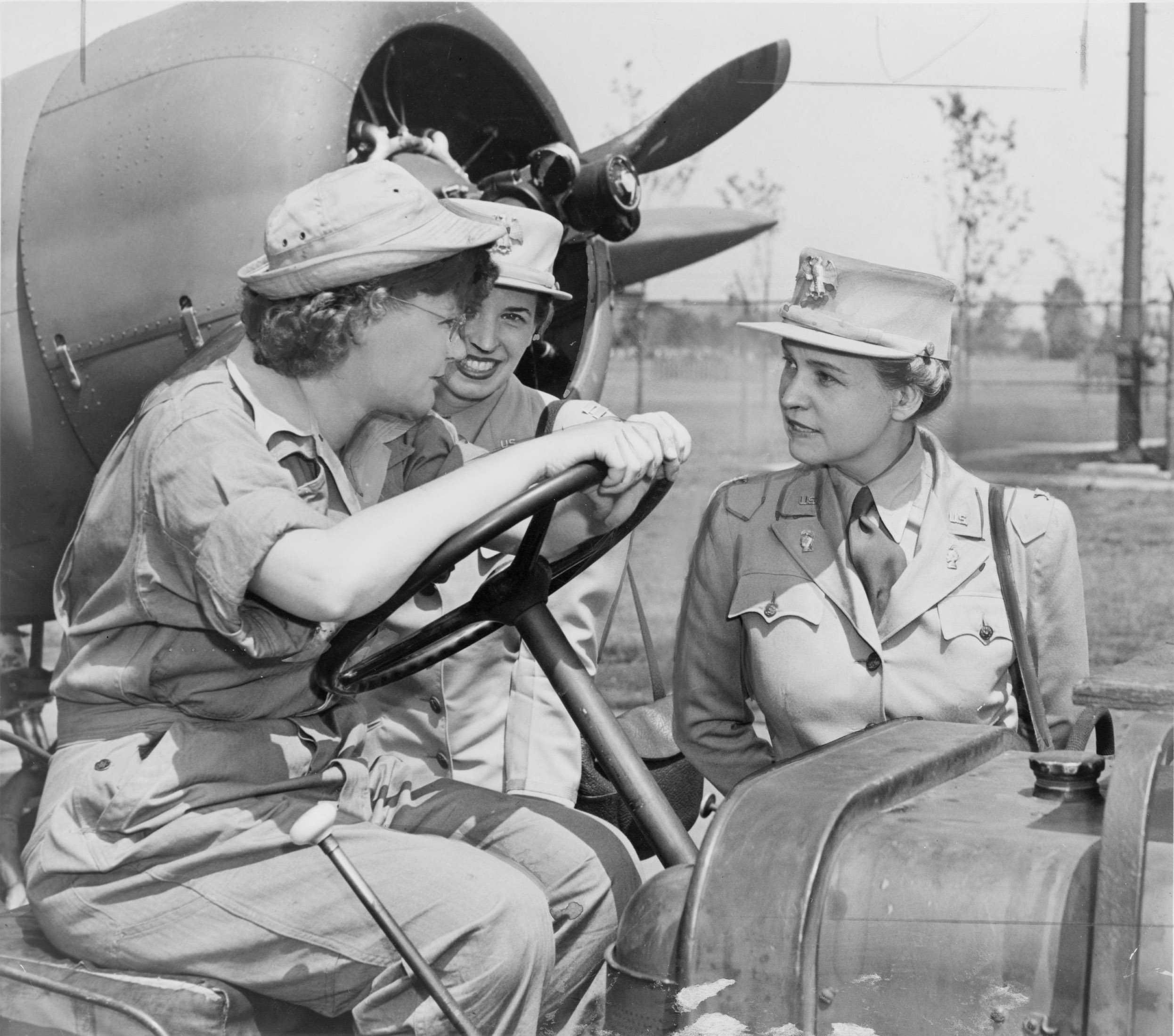
Col. Oveta Culp Hobby (right) talks with Auxiliary Margaret Peterson and Capt. Elizabeth Gilbert at Mitchel Field, New York. (photo: Al Aumuller, World Telegram & Sun.)

Oveta Culp Hobby (January 19, 1905 – August 16, 1995) was an American government official and businesswoman who served as the first United States Secretary of Health, Education, and Welfare (now known as Health and Human Services) from 1953 to 1955. A member of the Republican Party, Hobby was the second woman ever to serve in a presidential cabinet.

She also served as the first director of the Women's Army Corps from 16 May 1942 to 11 July 1945, and was sequentially editor, publisher and chair of the board of the Houston Post. She entered public service when President Dwight D. Eisenhower appointed her administrator of the Federal Security Agency, soon after reorganized as a federal executive department, known then as Department of Health, Education, and Welfare; and Hobby became its first head.

== Early life ==
Culp was born on January 19, 1905, in Killeen, Texas, to Texas lawyer and legislator Isaac William Culp and Emma Elizabeth Hoover. She briefly attended Mary Hardin Baylor College for Women, and attended law classes at South Texas College of Law and Commerce, but did not graduate from either school. She went on to study law at the University of Texas Law School, but she did not formally enroll and therefore never received a degree. Starting at age 21, she served for several years as parliamentarian of the Texas House of Representatives and was an unsuccessful candidate for the legislature in 1930, before beginning a journalism career in 1931, at age 26. Hobby was a member of Junior League of Houston, TX.

== War service ==
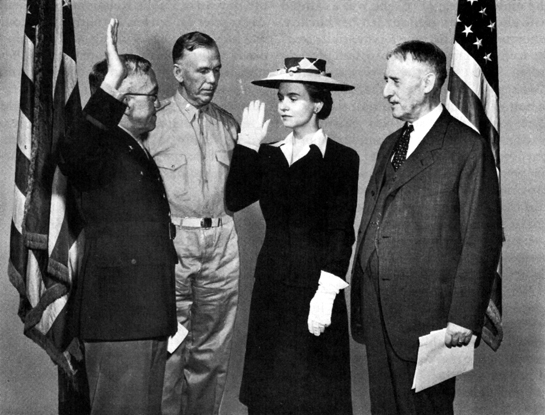
Oveta Culp Hobby is sworn in as the first WAAC by Maj. Gen. Myron C. Cramer. General George C. Marshall, second from left, and Secretary of War Henry L. Stimson were witnesses of the ceremony.

During World War II, Hobby headed the Women's Interest Section in the War Department's Bureau of Public Relations for a short time and then became the director of the Women's Army Auxiliary Corps (WAAC) (later the Women's Army Corps [WAC]), which was created to fill gaps in the Army left by a shortage of men. She was commissioned a colonel in the U.S. Army on 5 July 1943. The members of the WAC were the first women other than nurses to wear U.S. Army uniforms and to receive military benefits through the G.I. Bill. Hobby devoted herself to integrating the WAC within the military, despite considering women's military involvement a temporary necessity, and worked to protect and strengthen the WAC and its image. As director, she raised admission standards and created a Code of Conduct specific to the WAC to create a tightly regulated, high quality organization that portrayed women's corps in a good light. These standards, along with actions to guard the morals and image of members, developed from Hobby's prior experience with publicity and knowledge of the importance of media representation. Hobby achieved the rank of colonel and received the Distinguished Service Medal for efforts during the war. She was the first woman in the Army to receive this award.

== Political career ==
Hobby joined the Eisenhower administration in 1953 after being appointed as head of the Federal Security Agency, a non-cabinet post, although she was invited to sit in on cabinet meetings. Soon, on April 11, 1953, she became the first secretary and first woman, of the new Department of Health, Education, and Welfare, which later became the Department of Health and Human Services. This was her second time organizing a new government agency. Among other decisions and actions at HEW, she made the decision to approve Jonas Salk's polio vaccine.

Culp attempted to restructure Social Security payroll taxes (FICA and SECA), and was met with strong opposition. She resigned her post in 1955. At the time of her resignation she was embroiled in controversies related to the polio vaccine Cutter Incident. Back in Houston, Hobby resumed her position with the Houston Post as president and editor and cared for her ailing husband. She went on to serve on many boards and advisory positions with various civic and business institutions around the country. Seventeen colleges and universities, including Columbia University and the University of Pennsylvania, awarded her honorary doctoral degrees. She was the first woman who was considered for a United States presidential candidacy by an incumbent United States President; Eisenhower encouraged her to run for president in 1960, but she did not run.

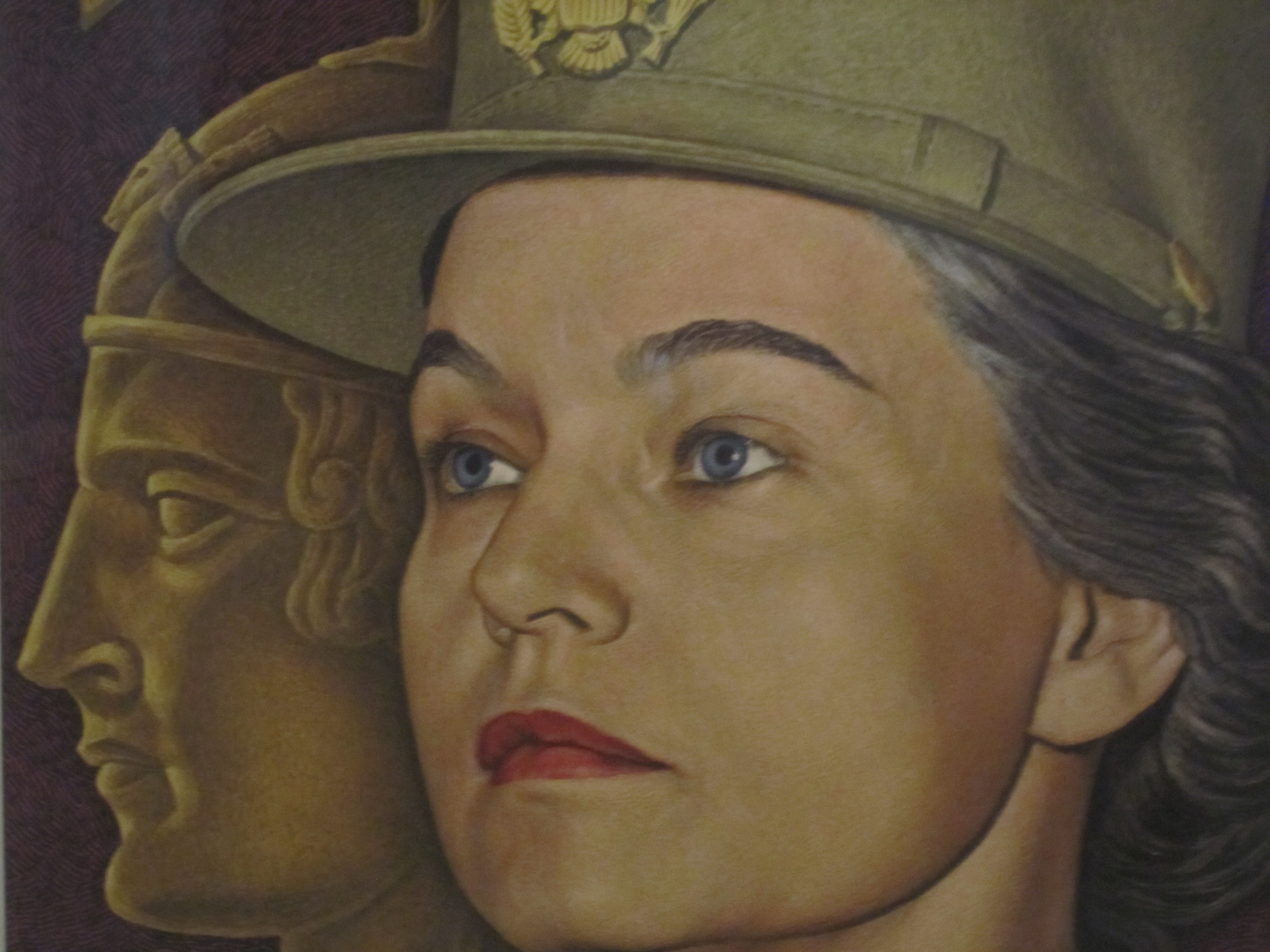
Colonel Hobby's portrait in military uniform at the National Portrait Gallery in Washington, D.C.

== Personal life and family ==
In 1931, she married William P. Hobby, an editor and future owner of the Houston Post, who served as the 27th governor of Texas from 1917 to 1921. They had two children together. She took a position on the editorial staff at the Post. In ensuing years she became the newspaper's executive vice president, then its president, ultimately becoming its publisher and co-owner with her husband. In 1938, upon becoming vice president of the newspaper, she gave greater prominence to women's news.

Hobby and her husband were both Southern Democrats, but soon became dissatisfied with the party throughout the 1930s. They believed Franklin D. Roosevelt's social programs overextended their original intent. After World War II, Hobby tried to sway Democratic voters to swing Republican for presidential nominees by establishing many statewide organizations.

She died of a stroke in 1995, in Houston, and was buried at Glenwood Cemetery.

Her son William P. Hobby Jr., served as the 37th lieutenant governor of Texas from 1973 to 1991, the longest serving in that position. Unlike his parents, who had become Republicans in the 1930s, William Jr. is a Democrat. Her daughter Jessica was married to Henry E. Catto Jr., the former United States Ambassador to Great Britain and was an activist for environmental causes and for the Democratic Party. Hobby's grandson Paul Hobby narrowly lost the election for comptroller of Texas to Carole Strayhorn in the 1998 general election.

== Legacy ==
- The library at Central Texas College is named after her.
- A residence dormitory at Texas A&M University in College Station, Texas, is named after her.
- The Oveta Culp Hobby Soldier & Family Readiness Center at Fort Hood is named for her.
- An elementary school in Fort Hood (Killeen ISD) is named after her.
- The U.S. Post Office issued an 84-cent stamp in her honor in 2011.
- A building on the grounds of the Peaceable Kingdom (Children's Retreat Center) in Killeen Texas is named after her.
- A Department of Health, Education and Welfare Service award was named in her honor to recognize superior devotion to duty.
- In 1996, Hobby was inducted into the National Women's Hall of Fame.
- On December 7, 2021, her 1943 oil portrait in uniform painted by noted portrait artist Seymour M. Stone was installed in the Killeen Main Library in Killeen, Texas.
- The Education Center at the National Museum of the Pacific War in Fredericksburg, Texas is named for her.

== Sources ==
- Pando, Robert T. "Oveta Culp Hobby: A Study in Power and Control." Ph.D. dissertation, Florida State University, 2008, 442 pages. Oveta Culp Hobby: A Study of Power and Control
- Treadwell, Mattie E. The Woman's Army Corps. The U.S. Army in World War II (Washington, D.C.: U.S. Army Center of Military History, 1954). The Women's Army Corps - U.S. Army Center of Military History
- "U.S. Army Women's Museum Celebrates Women's History Month: Oveta Culp Hobby" - YouTube
- Walsh, Kelli Cardenas. "Oveta Culp Hobby: A Transformational Leader from the Texas Legislature to Washington, D.C." Ph.D. dissertation, University of South Carolina, 2006, 199 pages.
- Winegarten, Debra L. Oveta Culp Hobby: Colonel, Cabinet Member, Philanthropist. (Austin: University of Texas Press, 2014). https://books.google.com/books/about/Oveta_Culp_Hobby.html?id=M-dlAwAAQBAJ&source=kp_book_description

== See also ==
- List of female United States Cabinet members

Awards and achievements
Preceded by Erich von Manstein	Cover of Time; 17 January 1944	Succeeded by Jimmy Durante
Political offices
Preceded by Oscar Ewing	Administrator of the Federal Security Agency; 1953	Succeeded by Herself as United States Secretary of Health, Education, and Welfare
Preceded by Herself as Administrator of the Federal Security Agency	United States Secretary of Health, Education, and Welfare; 1953–1955	Succeeded by Marion Folsom
