= Histidinol-phosphatase =

Class of enzymes

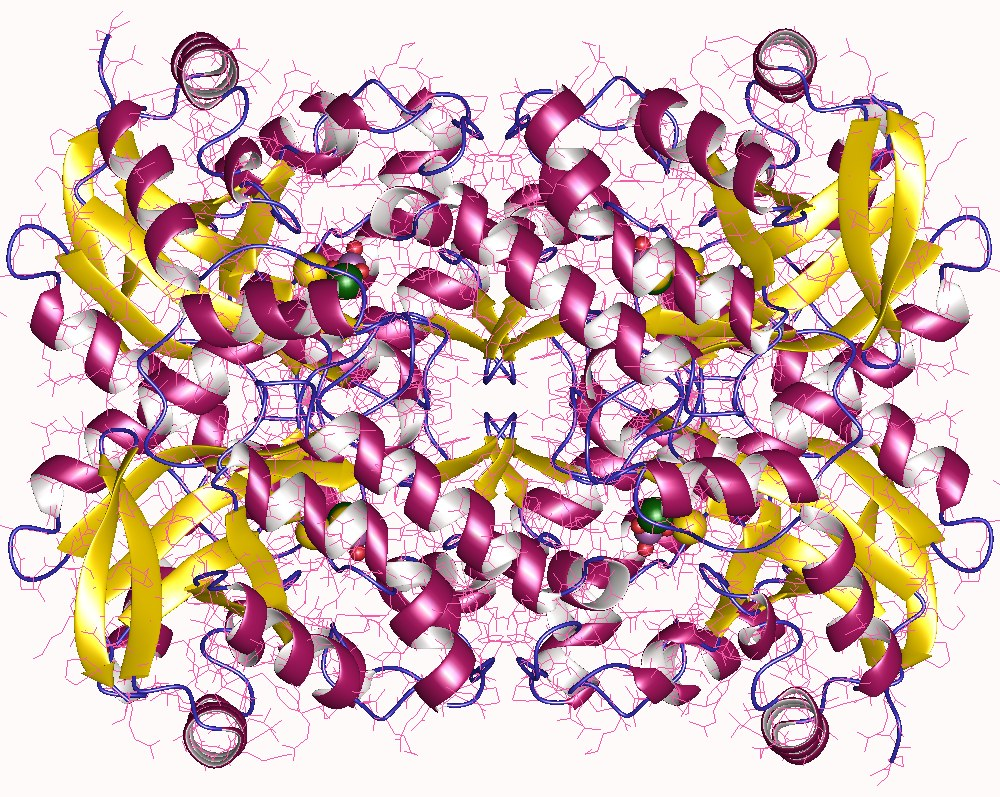
- Histidinol-phosphatase tetramer, Thermus thermophilus

Identifiers
- EC no.: 3.1.3.15
- CAS no.: 9025-79-0

Databases
- BRENDA: enzyme data
- ExPASy: NiceZyme view
- KEGG: enzyme entry
- MetaCyc: metabolic pathway
- Rhea: reactions
- PDB structures: RCSB PDB PDBe PDBsum
- Gene Ontology: AmiGO / QuickGO
Search
- PMC: articles
- PubMed: articles
- NCBI: proteins

The enzyme histidinol-phosphatase (EC 3.1.3.15) catalyzes the reaction

L-histidinol phosphate
H_{2}O
P_{i}
histidinol

The enzyme characterised from Neurospora crassa hydrolyses L-histidinol phosphate to histidinol and orthophosphate. The reaction is part of the biosynthesis of the amino acid histidine.

== Nomenclature ==
This enzyme is a hydrolase, specifically one acting on phosphoric monoester bonds. The systematic name is L-histidinol-phosphate phosphohydrolase. Other names in common use include histidinol phosphate phosphatase, L-histidinol phosphate phosphatase, histidinolphosphate phosphatase, HPpase, and histidinolphosphatase.

== E. coli ==
In E. coli the enzyme encoded by the gene hisB is a fused imidazoleglycerol-phosphate dehydratase and histidinol-phosphatase.
