= Cranberry scare of 1959 =

American food scare

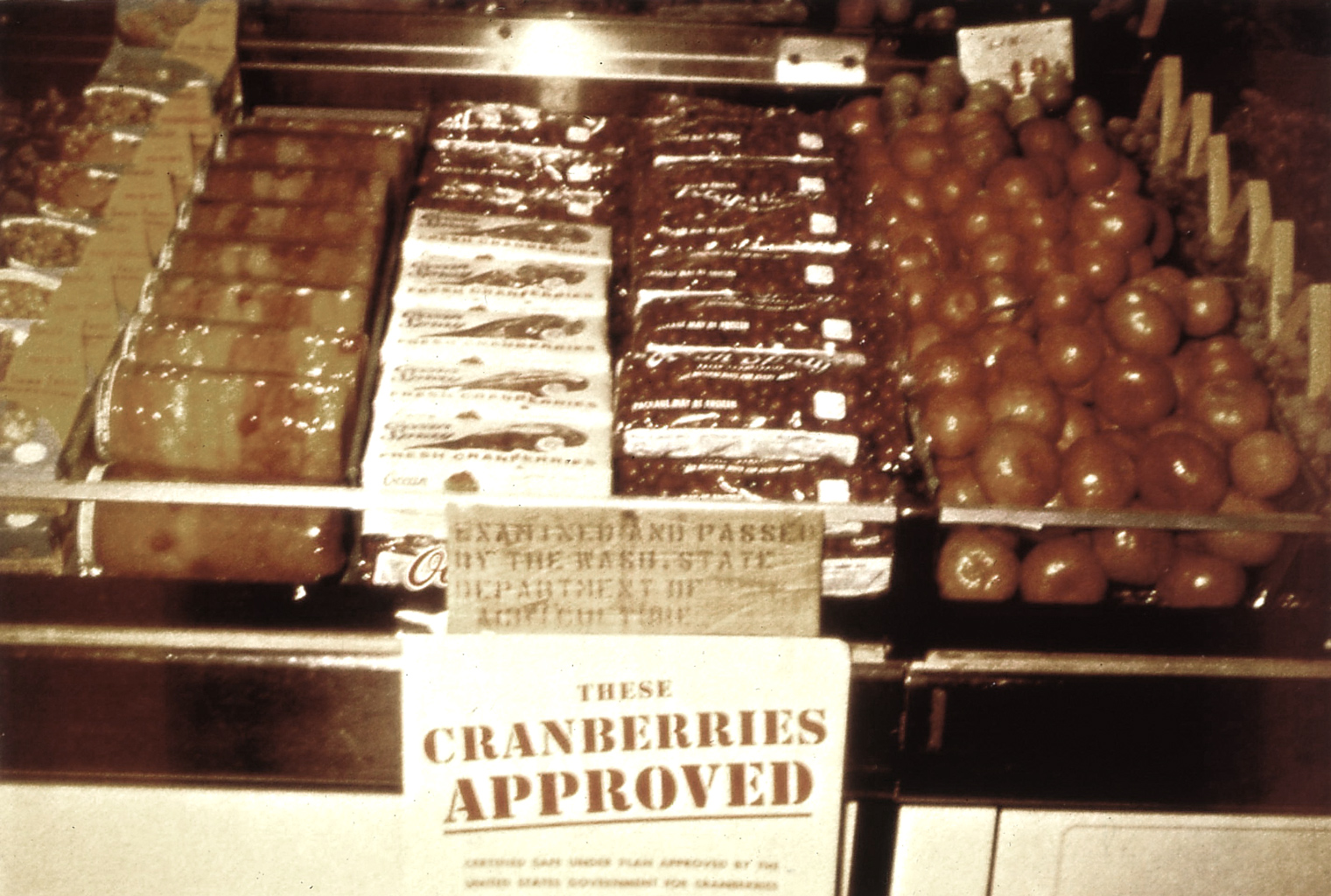
Cranberries the FDA had cleared as aminotriazole-free were labeled as "approved"

The cranberry scare of 1959 was an American food scare caused by government reports that the cranberry harvest was contaminated with the herbicide aminotriazole. The scare was set off on November 9, 1959, a few weeks before Thanksgiving, at a Department of Health, Education, and Welfare news conference where Arthur Flemming announced that two shipments of cranberries had tested positive for aminotriazole, a possible carcinogen. This was especially disruptive as, at the time, the vast majority of cranberry consumption in the United States happened during the holiday season.

Due to the scare, some grocery stores stopped carrying cranberry products and sales of fresh cranberries fell by 73%. Shortly before Thanksgiving many batches of cranberries were certified as aminotriazole-free, but by then many had already made up their minds. Even President Dwight D. Eisenhower's Thanksgiving dinner that year substituted apple sauce for cranberry sauce.

== Background ==
Aminotriazole was first approved as an herbicide for cranberries in the United States in 1958, but because Food and Drug Administration experiments in rats showed it could cause thyroid cancer its use was restricted to post-harvest (to avoid contaminating the berries). While these experiments did show some risk, the equivalent dose for this risk in humans would have been thousands of pounds of tainted cranberries.

Also in 1958, the Food Additives Amendment became law. This law included the "Delaney clause" which completely banned food additives that had been found to cause cancer. The clause did not have any exception for chemicals based on the risk or dose level. Because of this, in 1959, Ocean Spray, the primary American cranberry growers association, required all cranberry growers to avoid using aminotriazole. Despite this warning, some batches of cranberries started testing positive for aminotriazole later in the year.

== The scare ==
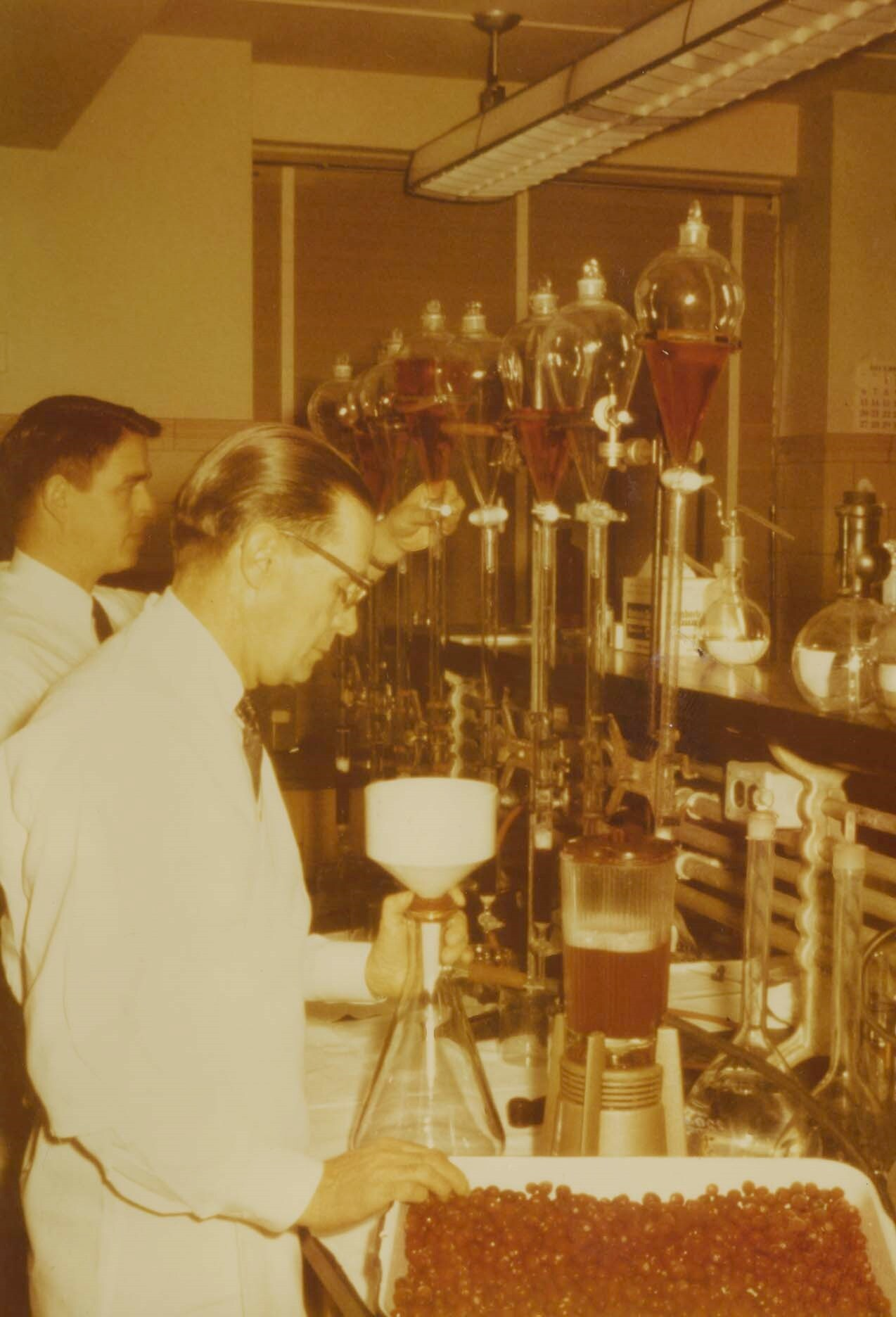
FDA scientists worked long hours to test cranberries before Thanksgiving

On November 9, 1959, at a regular untelevised press conference, Secretary of Health, Education, and Welfare Arthur Flemming announced that some cranberries from Oregon and Washington had tested positive for aminotriazole. He said that "If housewives are unable to determine where berries were grown the Government advises them not to buy, either in canned or fresh form, despite the approach of Thanksgiving." Cranberry growers would come to call this day "Black Monday".

This news caused a scare across the country. Some governments, such as in Ohio or San Francisco, banned sales of cranberries. Many grocery stores stopped selling cranberry products. The media suggested alternatives to cranberries for the Thanksgiving meal, such as pickled watermelon rind or lingonberries.

American Cyanamid, one of the manufacturers of aminotriazole, asserted that its tests showed the cranberries posed no risk to humans. Cranberry industry members urged president Eisenhower to fire Flemming. Richard Nixon and John F. Kennedy, both potential 1960 presidential candidates, publicly ate cranberry products to show support of the growers.

The scare significantly impacted cranberry growers, who feared substantial financial losses. To mitigate the crisis, the FDA tasked its chemists with testing batches of cranberries as quickly as possible. Eventually 99% of the cranberries were cleared for release. Despite this, over $40 million in cranberries were lost and Ocean Spray laid off a third of its workers.

== Aftermath ==
The impact of the scare on Americans' interest in cranberries disappeared by the following Thanksgiving.

In 1962, the United States Department of Agriculture made an $8 million indemnification payment to compensate affected growers.

The Delaney Clause was repealed by the Food Quality Protection Act in 1996.

== See also ==
- 1989 Chilean grape scare
- 2018 Australian strawberry contamination
