= Flemming Rule =

United States administrative ruling

The Flemming Rule of 1960 was an administrative ruling which decreed that U.S. states could not deny income assistance eligibility through the U.S. Aid to Families with Dependent Children program on the basis of a home being considered unsuitable per the woman's children being termed as illegitimate, a term for the status of a child born to parents who are unmarried to one another. It was named after Arthur Flemming, who at the time was the head of the United States Department of Health and Human Services.

In 1960, the U.S. state of Louisiana expelled 23,000 children from its welfare program in what became known as the "Louisiana Incident." This was done because the children had been born outside of wedlock, and were considered illegitimate by the state. Similar types of welfare denial had occurred in other states. In response to this, the Louisiana Department of Health, Education and Welfare, administrator of the income assistance program, implemented the Flemming Rule.

A 1997 article by Claudia Lawrence-Webb claimed that the child welfare system had problems fairly representing children of color and signified this problem was due to the Flemming Rule. Webb suggested that the rule was implemented poorly, which led to unnecessary negative consequences for African American children. In the article, Webb also discusses how the Flemming Rule may have influenced future policies.
