= 3-Amino-1,2,4-triazole =

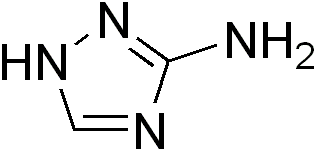

Names
- Preferred IUPAC name 1H-1,2,4-Triazol-3-amine
- Other names 1,2,4-Triazol-3-amine aminotriazole Amitrol; Amitrole; 3-Aminotriazole; 2-Amino-1,3,4-triazole

Identifiers
CAS Number	61-82-5
3D model (JSmol)	Interactive image
Abbreviations	3-AT
Beilstein Reference	107687
ChEBI	CHEBI:40036
ChEMBL	ChEMBL232801
ChemSpider	1577
ECHA InfoCard	100.000.474
EC Number	200-521-5
Gmelin Reference	200706
KEGG	C11261
MeSH	Amitrole
PubChem CID	1639
RTECS number	XZ3850000
UNII	ZF80H5GXUF
CompTox Dashboard (EPA)	DTXSID0020076
- InChI: InChI=1S/C2H4N4/c3-2-4-1-5-6-2/h1H,(H3,3,4,5,6) Key: KLSJWNVTNUYHDU-UHFFFAOYSA-N; InChI=1/C2H4N4/c3-2-4-1-5-6-2/h1H,(H3,3,4,5,6) Key: KLSJWNVTNUYHDU-UHFFFAOYAV
- SMILES: n1c[nH]nc1N

Properties
Chemical formula	C_{2}H_{4}N_{4}
Molar mass	84.082 g·mol^{−1}
Appearance	colorless/white crystals or powder
Odor	odorless
Density	1.138 g/mL
Melting point	157 to 159 °C (315 to 318 °F; 430 to 432 K)
Boiling point	347
Solubility in water	28 g/100 mL
Solubility	soluble in acetonitrile, chloroform, ethanol, methanol, methylene chloride negligible in ethyl acetate
Vapor pressure	3.13×10^{−9} mmHg

Hazards
- Occupational safety and health (OHS/OSH)
Main hazards	potential occupational carcinogen
- GHS labelling
Pictograms	(GHS08: Health hazard) (GHS09: Environmental hazard)
Signal word	Warning
Hazard statements	H361, H373, H411
Precautionary statements	P201, P202, P260, P273, P281, P308+P313, P314, P391, P405, P501
NFPA 704 (fire diamond)	1 0 0
Flash point	Non-flammable
- Lethal dose or concentration (LD, LC)
LD_{50} (median dose)	1,100 to 2,500 mg/kg
- NIOSH (US health exposure limits)
PEL (Permissible)	none
REL (Recommended)	Ca TWA 0.2 mg/m^{3}
IDLH (Immediate danger)	Ca/N.D.
- Except where otherwise noted, data are given for materials in their standard state (at 25 °C [77 °F], 100 kPa). verify (what is ?) Infobox references

3-Amino-1,2,4-triazole (3-AT, or amitrol) is a heterocyclic organic compound used as a herbicide, that consists of 1,2,4-triazole with an amino group as a substituent.

3-AT is a competitive inhibitor of the product of the HIS3 gene, imidazoleglycerol-phosphate dehydratase. Imidazoleglycerol-phosphate dehydratase is an enzyme catalyzing the sixth step of histidine production.

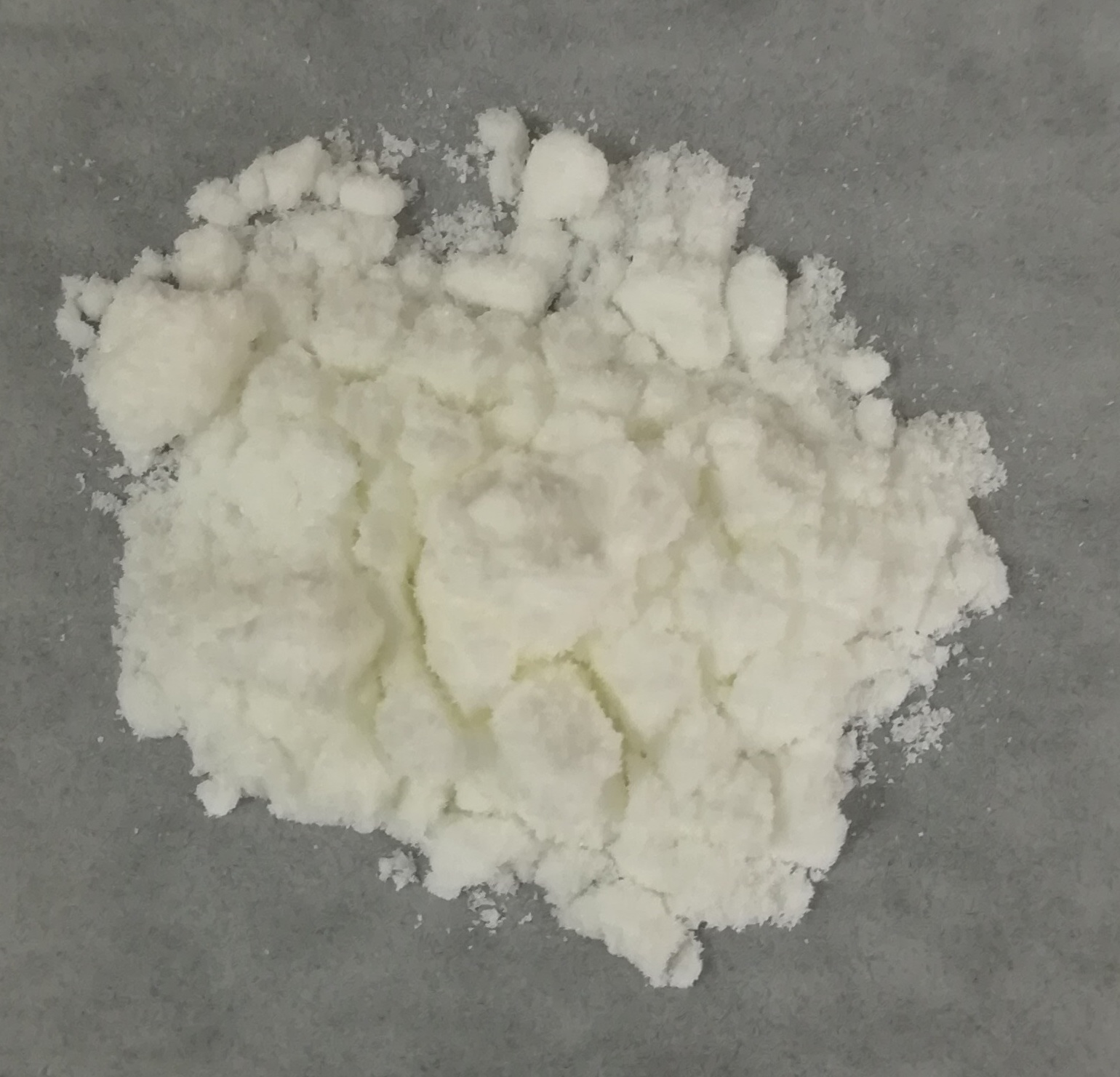
3-Amino-1,2,4-triazole in powder form

3-AT is also a nonselective systemic triazole herbicide used on nonfood croplands to control annual grasses and broadleaf and aquatic weeds. It is not used on food crops because of its carcinogenic properties. As an herbicide, it is known as aminotriazole, amitrole or amitrol.

Amitrol was included in a biocide ban proposed by the Swedish Chemicals Agency and approved by the European Parliament on January 13, 2009. Amitrol's mode of action is unknown, though it is classed as a resistance group Q herbicide.

== Applications in microbiology ==
By applying 3-AT to a yeast cell culture which is dependent upon a plasmid containing HIS3 to produce histidine (i.e. its own HIS3 analogue is not present or nonfunctional), an increased level of HIS3 expression is required in order for the yeast cell to survive. This has proved useful in various two-hybrid system, where a high-affinity binding between two proteins (i.e., higher expression of the HIS3 gene) will allow the yeast cell to survive in media containing higher concentrations of 3-AT. This selection process is performed using selective media, containing no histidine.

== 1959 cranberry contamination ==
On November 9, 1959, the secretary of the United States Department of Health, Education, and Welfare, Arthur S. Flemming, announced that some of the 1959 cranberry crop was tainted with traces of the herbicide aminotriazole. The market for cranberries collapsed and growers lost millions of dollars. However, Ocean Spray recovered by expanding the market for cranberry juice, which, although widely available for sale, was before then not popular. This ensured cranberry growers would not have to rely mostly on Thanksgiving and Christmas for sales, which was the case until the 1959 incident.
