= HIS3 =

Imidazoleglycerol-phosphate dehydratase

Identifiers
- Organism: Saccharomyces cerevisiae
- Symbol: HIS3
- Entrez: 854377
- HomoloGene: 6979
- RefSeq (mRNA): NM_001183621.1
- RefSeq (Prot): NP_014845.1
- UniProt: P06633

Other data
- EC number: 4.2.1.19
- Chromosome: XV: 0.72 - 0.72 Mb
Search for
- Structures: Swiss-model
- Domains: InterPro

The HIS3 gene, found in the Saccharomyces cerevisiae yeast, encodes a protein called Imidazoleglycerol-phosphate dehydratase which catalyses the sixth step in histidine biosynthesis. It is analogous to hisB in Escherichia coli.

== Exploits ==
Mutations in Escherichia coli's analogous gene, hisB allows researchers to select only those individuals expressing the HIS3 gene included on a plasmid. The HIS3 gene is coupled to a certain promoter which can only be activated by successful binding of the relevant transcription factors. This is used in certain methods of bacterial two-hybrid screening to allow the survival of E. coli in which a desired protein-DNA or protein-protein interaction is taking place.
