= Marion B. Folsom =

American politician (1893–1976)

Marion Folsom
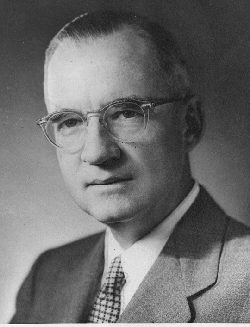

2nd United States Secretary of Health, Education, and Welfare
- In office August 1, 1955 – July 31, 1958
- President: Dwight D. Eisenhower
- Preceded by: Oveta Culp Hobby
- Succeeded by: Arthur Flemming

Personal details
- Born: Marion Bayard Folsom; November 23, 1893 McRae, Georgia, U.S.
- Died: September 27, 1976 (aged 82) Rochester, New York, U.S.
- Resting place: Arlington National Cemetery
- Party: Republican
- Spouse: Mary Davenport
- Children: 3
- Education: University of Georgia (BA); Harvard University (MBA)

Military service
- Allegiance: United States
- Branch/service: United States Army
- Rank: Captain
- Battles/wars: World War I

Marion Bayard Folsom (/ˈfoʊlsəm/; November 23, 1893 – September 27, 1976) was an American government official and businessman. He served as the U.S. Secretary of Health, Education and Welfare from 1955 to 1958 under President Dwight D. Eisenhower.

== Biography ==
Folsom was born in McRae, Georgia. He was the son of William Bryant Folsom and Margaret Jane (née McRae). Folsom graduated from the University of Georgia in 1912, and he received a master's degree from the Harvard Graduate School of Business Administration in 1914.

In 1914, Folsom joined the Eastman Kodak Company. After serving with the Army as a captain in World War I, he returned to Kodak as its statistical secretary. As early as 1921, he proposed that Kodak create a private unemployment insurance program. During the Great Depression, he was the architect of the 1931 Rochester Plan, a program by 14 Rochester employers to pay unemployment insurance to any of their laid-off workers. The plan would cover 26,000 workers beginning in 1933. Only eight of the companies involved managed to save enough money for payments, which proceeded from 1933 until 1936. The failure of the program to attract stronger support from the business community convinced Folsom that worker benefits should be provided by the government rather than private enterprise.

In 1934, Folsom was appointed by President Franklin D. Roosevelt as a member of an Advisory Council on Economic Security, which laid the foundation for the present Social Security program. He served from 1935 to 1953 as a Treasurer of the Eastman Kodak Company.

After resigning from Eastman Kodak, he became the Under Secretary of the Treasury from 1953 to 1955. In this position, he wrote a complete revision of the federal tax code. He served as the Secretary of Health, Education, and Welfare with President Dwight D. Eisenhower from August 1, 1955, following the resignation of Oveta Culp Hobby, until July 31, 1958.

Folsom married Mary Davenport, on November 16, 1918, with whom he had three children, Jane McRae, Marion Bayard Jr. and Frances Folsom. He died in Rochester, New York, on September 27, 1976. Folsom was buried in Arlington National Cemetery in Arlington County, Virginia.

Political offices
Preceded by Oveta Culp Hobby	United States Secretary of Health, Education, and Welfare; 1955–1958	Succeeded by Arthur S. Flemming
