= Arthur Flemming =

American government official (1905–1996)

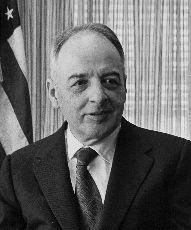

Chair of the United States Commission on Civil Rights
- In office 1974–1981
- President: Gerald Ford; Jimmy Carter
- Preceded by: Steve Horn (acting)
- Succeeded by: Clarence M. Pendleton Jr.

3rd United States Secretary of Health, Education, and Welfare
- In office August 1, 1958 – January 19, 1961
- President: Dwight D. Eisenhower
- Preceded by: Marion B. Folsom
- Succeeded by: Abraham Ribicoff

Director of the Office of Defense Mobilization
- In office January 20, 1953 – March 14, 1957
- President: Dwight D. Eisenhower
- Preceded by: Henry H. Fowler
- Succeeded by: Gordon Gray

Personal details
- Born: Arthur Sherwood Flemming; June 12, 1905 Kingston, New York, U.S.
- Died: September 7, 1996 (aged 91) Alexandria, Virginia, U.S.
- Resting place: Montrepose Cemetery
- Spouse: Bernice Virginia Moler (m. 1934)
- Children: 5
- Education: Ohio Wesleyan University (BA)

Arthur Sherwood Flemming (June 12, 1905 – September 7, 1996) was an American government official. He served as the United States Secretary of Health, Education, and Welfare from 1958 until 1961 under President Dwight D. Eisenhower's administration. Flemming was an important force in the shaping of Social Security policy for more than four decades. He also served as president of the University of Oregon, Ohio Wesleyan University, and Macalester College. In 1966, he was elected to a four-year term as president of the National Council of Churches, the leading Christian ecumenical organization in the United States. From 1974 to 1981, he was the chairman of the United States Commission on Civil Rights.

== Early life and education ==
Flemming was born in Kingston, New York, to Judge Harry Hardwick Flemming and the former Harriet (née Sherwood). Flemming graduated from Ohio Wesleyan University, class of 1927 and a member of the Epsilon chapter of Alpha Sigma Phi fraternity. On December 14, 1934, he married Bernice Virginia Moler. They had five children.

== Federal government career ==
Flemming's government career began in 1939, when President Franklin D. Roosevelt appointed him to the U.S. Civil Service Commission. While in this capacity, he was appointed to the Navy Manpower Survey Board under Vice Admiral Adolphus Andrews, which was established to determine whether shore establishments were over-manned or under-manned and whether Navy's manpower was being utilized to the best possible advantage.

He was a member of the Hoover Commission, which studied the organization of federal government in the late 1940s and the early 1950s. Flemming was the chairman of the White House Conference on Aging in 1971, and was the appointed U.S. commissioner on Aging by President Richard M. Nixon.

Flemming was also a co-founder of the Save Our Security coalition, a Social Security advocacy group. He was the recipient of two Presidential Medals of Freedom, one in 1957, from President Dwight D. Eisenhower and the second one in 1994, from President Bill Clinton. Secretary of Health and Human Services Donna Shalala said of Flemming: "He was one of the great intellects of social policy, combining extraordinary knowledge with a rare gift for policy-making."

== Secretary of Health, Education and Welfare ==
From 1958 until 1961, Flemming served as U.S. Secretary of Health, Education and Welfare, following the resignation of Marion B. Folsom. On November 9, 1959, Secretary Flemming announced, seventeen days before the Thanksgiving holiday, that some of the 1959 crop of cranberries contained traces of aminotriazole, a weed killer, which had been shown to cause thyroid cancer in rats in laboratory testing. Although the sale of cranberries was not banned, Flemming cautioned that if a housewife did not know where the berries in a product came from, "to be on the safe side, she doesn't buy". Flemming acknowledged the impact of his announcement before the holidays, but added "I don't have any right to sit on information of this kind."

After decreased sales of cranberries during the holiday season, the U.S. Food and Drug Administration (FDA) determined, in January 1960, that 99 percent of the crop had not been contaminated. However, the incident did cause cranberry growers to cease using amitrole as an herbicide, as demanded by the farmers' largest consumer, the Ocean Spray company. Before 1959, cranberries were seldom consumed except during Thanksgiving and Christmas, and cranberry juice was available, but not popular. After the disastrous holiday season, Ocean Spray promoted the popularity of the juice, and the production of the berries was increased in the long run.

Flemming retired at the end of President Eisenhower's administration on January 19, 1961. Later, he was the chairman of the Commission on Civil Rights.

== University president ==
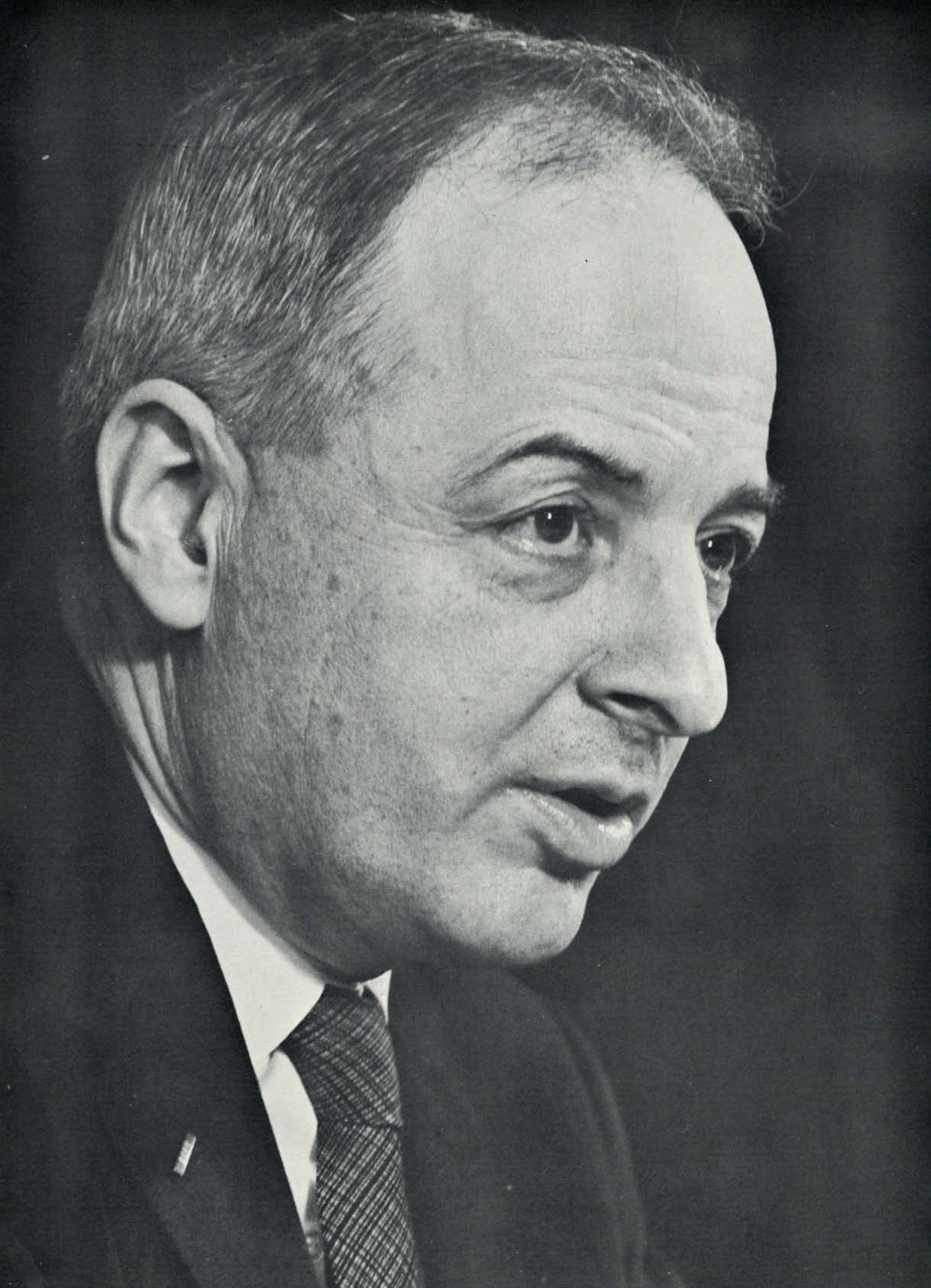
Flemming as president of the University of Oregon

Barely out of his degree at AU, Flemming was petitioning Roosevelt for New Deal funds to start a program at American University. The program was the School of Public Affairs, and Flemming was its first director.

Flemming served as president of Ohio Wesleyan University. He was the university's first president to be an alumnus and a layman (non-ordained minister). Having served in the Franklin D. Roosevelt and Harry S. Truman administrations, his Wesleyan inauguration at the June commencement of 1949 drew many famous speakers and celebrities.

From 1961 to 1968, Flemming served as president of the University of Oregon. During his popular and controversial tenure, the number of students grew from 8,000 to 14,000, and federal funding for the university rose dramatically. Flemming was responsible for the addition of the School of Community Services and Public Affairs, the Pine Mountain Observatory and the building of various laboratories on campus. He defended the right of the Communist Party, under the leadership of Gus Hall, to speak on campus and he also convinced Tom Autzen to contribute money toward to the building of Autzen Stadium.

From 1968 to 1971, Flemming served as president of Macalester College in St. Paul, Minnesota. During his short-lived tenure, he founded the Expanded Educational Opportunities (EEO) Program, which provided "total aid," including room & board, books, and travel expenses, to students from "racial minority groups and economically deprived backgrounds." Flemming had a close relationship with Black student groups on campus, even marching with students to protest a St. Paul landlord who had refused to rent to Black students. Former Vice President Hubert Humphrey, who returned briefly to Macalester (where he had previously taught) after losing the presidential election in 1968, also joined the march.

== Death ==
He died of renal failure at a retirement home in Alexandria, Virginia, on September 7, 1996, at the age of 91. Flemming was buried at the Montrepose Cemetery in his hometown of Kingston, New York.

== See also ==
- Arthur S. Flemming Award
- Flemming Rule

Political offices
Preceded by Henry H. Fowler	Director of the Office of Defense Mobilization; 1953–1957	Succeeded by Gordon Gray
Preceded by Marion B. Folsom	United States Secretary of Health, Education, and Welfare; 1958–1961	Succeeded by Abraham A. Ribicoff
Government offices
Preceded by Steve Horn; Acting	Chair from Commission on Civil Rights; 1974–1981	Succeeded by Clarence M. Pendleton Jr.
