= List of constitutional crises =

This is a list of constitutional crises, sorted by location. A constitutional crisis is when severe problems or conflicts arise in government that the constitution cannot resolve, or that arise because of the constitution itself.

== Africa ==
=== Democratic Republic of the Congo ===
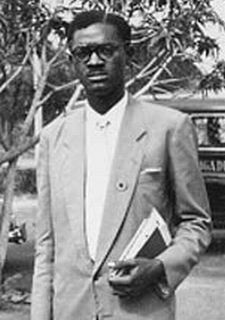
Patrice Lumumba

- The Congo Crisis. President Joseph Kasavubu and Prime Minister Patrice Lumumba attempted to dismiss each other in September 1960. General Mobutu Sese Seko deposed both in a coup later that month, then restored Kasavubu as president.

=== Egypt ===
- Egypt experienced a constitutional crisis when President Hosni Mubarak was removed in the Egyptian Revolution. The country was left without a president until President Mohamed Morsi was elected and then again when Morsi was arrested by the Egyptian Armed Forces in a 2013 coup d'état until President Abdel Fattah el-Sisi took office.

=== Malawi ===
- A constitutional crisis occurred in Malawi in 2012 with regard to the succession of Bingu wa Mutharika. The president and vice-president were from different parties which led to deliberations over who the rightful successor would be and the constitutional crisis. Vice-President Joyce Banda eventually succeeded wa Mutharika.

=== Gambia ===
- Following the victory of Adama Barrow in the 2016 presidential election, president Yahya Jammeh rejected the results and refused to step down. On 17 January, Jammeh declared a 90-day state of emergency in an attempt to extend his term of office. Senegalese, Ghanaian and Nigerian forces entered the Gambia on 19 January to enforce the election results. On 21 January, Jammeh stepped down and left the country.

=== Rhodesia ===
- Amid demands from British politicians to enfranchise the black majority population as a condition for independence, the white minority government of Ian Smith unilaterally declared independence in 1965. The UK rejected the declaration and continued to claim sovereignty over Rhodesia until a framework for independence and black enfranchisement was negotiated in the 1979 Lancaster House Agreement.

=== Somalia ===
- An ongoing constitutional crisis developed in Somalia when the Somali President, Hassan Sheikh Mohamud, changed the Constitution of Somalia on 30 April 2024. The change was immediately opposed by the President of Puntland, Said Abdullahi Deni followed by the President of Jubaland. As a result, Puntland withdrew its recognition of the Federal Government of Somalia and declared itself an independent state based on Article 4 of the Puntland Constitution. Jubaland state meanwhile cut its relations with the Somali government.

=== South Africa ===
- The Coloured vote constitutional crisis (1951–55): The National Party government disputed a Supreme Court decision overturning its Separate Representation of Voters Act to disenfranchise Coloured voters in the Cape Province. Its attempt to reverse the decision in an ad hoc court was also overturned, after which the party used reforms to the Senate to pass the measure legally.

== Asia ==
=== Bangladesh ===
- 2024 Bangladesh constitutional crisis: Following the resignation and ouster of Sheikh Hasina, which ended her 16-year rule, through a popular mass uprising, the country faced a period of political unrest, marked by a disputed succession of power.

=== Georgia ===
- 2024–2025 Georgian constitutional crisis: Leading up to the 2024 Georgian parliamentary election, oligarch Bidzina Ivanishvili established de facto control over government institutions. The elections resulted in a majority for his party, Georgian Dream, amid widespread reports of irregularities and suppression, and president Salome Zourabichvili announced that they would be re-run. Despite this, the new parliament convened and elected Mikheil Kavelashvili as president with opposition parties boycotting. Zourabichvili vacated her official residence on 29 December 2024 but maintained, along with opposition parties, that she was the legitimate president.

=== Iran ===
- Mohammed Reza Pahlavi's 1953 dismissal of Prime Minister Mohammed Mossadegh and Mossadegh's subsequent refusal to quit the office, leading to the 1953 Iranian coup d'état.

=== Malaysia ===
- 1966 Sarawak constitutional crisis started by a group of politicians who were dissatisfied towards Stephen Kalong Ningkan's leadership as chief minister. Ningkan was later removed from the chief minister post by the Governor of Sarawak in June 1966.
- The 1988 Malaysian constitutional crisis was a series of events that began with the United Malays National Organisation (UMNO) party elections in 1987 and ended with the suspension and the eventual removal of Lord President of the Supreme Court Tun Salleh Abas from his seat.
- The 1993 amendments to the Constitution of Malaysia (by some interpretations a constitutional crisis) involved the limitation of monarchs' legal immunity in Malaysia. Prime Minister Mahathir Mohamad successfully amended the constitution to make the monarchies more accountable to their actions.
- The 2020 Malaysian constitutional crisis was a series of events that began when Prime Minister Mahathir Mohamad and associates attempted to replace his coalition partners and form a unity government supported by opposition parties.

=== Pakistan ===
- Supreme Court Chief Justice Sajjad Ali Shah clashed repeatedly with Prime Minister Nawaz Sharif in late 1997, accusing him of undermining the court's independence. After Ali Shah suspended a constitutional amendment that prevented dismissal of the prime minister, Sharif ordered President Farooq Leghari to appoint a new chief justice. When Leghari refused, Sharif considered impeaching him, but backed down after a warning from the armed forces. Faced with a choice of accepting Sharif's demands or dismissing him, Leghari resigned. Ali Shah resigned shortly afterward, establishing Sharif's dominance.
- Following a no-confidence motion against Prime Minister Imran Khan on 8 March 2022, a constitutional crisis occurred when the deputy speaker of the National Assembly rejected the no-confidence motion on 3 April 2022. President Arif Alvi subsequently dissolved the national assembly, upon advice from the Prime Minister, which constitutionally could not be done by a Prime Minister who is facing a no-confidence motion.

=== Singapore ===
- The 1955 Singaporean constitutional crisis emerged following a dispute between Singaporean chief minister David Marshall and governor Robin Black on the Rendel Constitution. Marshall threatened resignation after Black disagreed with Marshall's interpretation of the constitution. The constitution was later edited by colonial authorities to favour the elected ministers.

=== Sri Lanka ===
- On 26 October 2018, President Maithripala Sirisena appointed former President Mahinda Rajapaksa as Prime Minister and dismissed incumbent Prime Minister Ranil Wickremesinghe. Ranil Wickremesing refused to accept the dismissal while stating that it was unconstitutional and undemocratic.

=== Taiwan ===
- The 2024–25 Taiwanese constitutional crisis. In December 2024, KMT–TPP coalition passed the unconstitutional law to paralyse Taiwan’s Constitutional Court.

=== Thailand ===
- The 2005–2006 Thai political crisis. In March 2006, 60 seats of the National Assembly of Thailand could not be elected, and Prime Minister Thaksin Shinawatra refused to resign, culminating in the 2006 Thai coup d'état by the Royal Thai Army.

== Europe ==
=== Austria ===
- The self-elimination of the Austrian Parliament in 1933, when all three speakers of the National Council resigned. Engelbert Dollfuss stated the parliament had eliminated itself and could rule by decree. This was a step towards the one-party fascist state, the Federal State of Austria.

=== Belgium ===
- The Royal Question over the status of king Leopold III began when he acted against ministerial advice during the 1940 Nazi invasion and refused to join the government in exile. Deported to Germany before Belgium's 1944 liberation, Leopold's return was narrowly approved in a 1950 referendum but a subsequent general strike prompted him to abdicate the following year.
- In 1990, King Baudouin refused routine Royal Assent to the law on abortion in Belgium. The issue was resolved by (constitutionally but controversially) having Baudouin temporarily declared incapable of reigning, the Council of Ministers giving assent as provided for in the Belgian Constitution, and Baudouin declared capable again.

=== Denmark ===
- The Easter Crisis of 1920, when King Christian X of Denmark dismissed the country's cabinet.

=== England ===
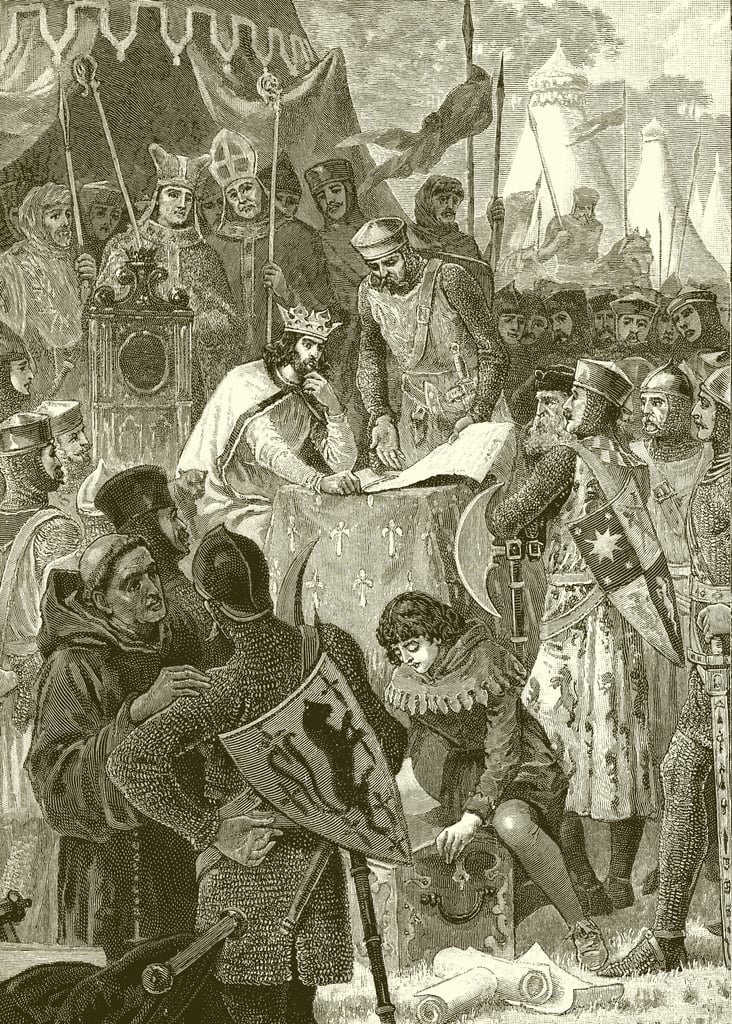
John of England signs Magna Carta. Illustration from Cassell's History of England (1902)

- The 1215 Barons' revolt against the rule of King John, which led to the Magna Carta. Immediately, John repudiated Magna Carta, leading to the First Barons' War.
- The English Reformation: Pope Clement VII's refusal to annul King Henry VIII's first marriage with Catherine of Aragon impeded the king's efforts to produce a male heir. Henry repudiated the Pope's ecclesiastical authority within England and required all officials to recognize him as Supreme Head of the Church of England, allowing him to divorce Catherine and marry Anne Boleyn.
- King Charles I's insistence on the Divine Right of Kings, manifest in his Personal Rule from 1629 to 1640, and leading directly to the Wars of the Three Kingdoms.
- The Glorious Revolution of 1688–89: The flight of King James II/VII from the country left no king in his place to rule England or Scotland or to summon a Parliament. When King William and Queen Mary jointly replaced him there was therefore no legally recognised Parliament to legitimise their irregular succession to the throne. This led to the Crown and Parliament Recognition Act 1689.

=== Estonia ===
- The early 1930s political crisis in Estonia as two constitutional reforms had been rejected by the electorate and only the third referendum in 1933 succeeded in replacing the parliamentary republic with the presidential republic. The succeeding constitutional reform was proposed by the Vaps Movement, who were however kept from power by the self-coup of Prime Minister Konstantin Päts, who was supported by the Riigikogu.

=== France ===
- The Brittany Affair of 1765: The king's court in Brittany forbade collection of taxes to which the provincial Estates did not consent. After King Louis XV annulled the court's decree, most of its members resigned. The chief prosecutor, Louis-René de Caradeuc de La Chalotais, was accused of writing letters denouncing the king's action and charged with treason. A court convened to try La Chalotais reached no conclusion due to questions of jurisdiction and the weakness of the evidence. The king then transferred the case to his own council, further inflaming fears of absolutism to the point that he was obligated to release La Chalotais and yield to the provincial authorities.
- The 16 May 1877 crisis: President Patrice de Mac-Mahon dismissed Prime Minister Jules Simon and named Albert de Broglie to replace him. The National Assembly refused to recognize the new government and a crisis, which ended with the dissolution of the Assembly and new elections, ensued.

=== Germany ===
- Crisis of the Weimar Republic (1930–1933): A series of conservative chancellors appointed by President Paul von Hindenburg were unable to secure legislation from the Reichstag, dominated first by the Social Democratic Party and later the Nazi and Communist parties. These chancellors increasingly turned to legislation by emergency presidential decrees, thereby laying the constitutional foundation of Adolf Hitler's dictatorship.

=== Malta ===
- The 1981 election, when, due to a quirk in that country's Single Transferable Vote system, the party winning more than half the votes won fewer than half the seats in parliament.

=== Order of Malta ===
- In December 2016 Matthew Festing, Grand Master of the Order of Malta, dismissed its Grand Chancellor Albrecht von Boeselager for allowing the distribution of contraceptives in violation of the Catholic Church's policy. Boeslanger protested that the dismissal was irregular under the Order's constitution and appealed to Pope Francis. Francis ordered an investigation of the dispute, then demanded and received Festing's resignation. The Order elected Giacomo dalla Torre del Tempio di Sanguinetto as Festing's successor on a program of constitutional reform and promoting religious obedience.

=== Norway ===
- Impeachment of prime minister Christian August Selmer's cabinet in 1883/1884 regarding the king's right to veto changes to the constitution, and establishment of an ad-hoc parliamentary practice until amended to the constitution in 2007.
- Dissolution of the union between Norway and Sweden in 1905

=== Roman Republic ===
- Caesar's Civil War: In 50 BC the Roman Senate ordered Julius Caesar, a popular military general and territorial governor, to disband his army and return to Rome after he invaded Gaul and Britain. Rather than comply, Caesar crossed the boundary of his territory with a legion of his army intending to confront the government. The Senate retreated before his advance, allowing him to establish a dictatorship that set the template for the Roman Empire. This has often been cast as an episode in a longer crisis.

=== Russia ===
- The constitutional crisis of 1993: President Boris Yeltsin ordered the dissolution of the Supreme Soviet when it refused constitutional reforms that would allow him to implement his privatization program. After the Constitutional Court struck down Yeltsin's order, parliament impeached him and recognized a rival government of dissenting officials. Yeltsin used military force to disperse parliament, established a government by presidential decree, and pushed through a new constitution that increased the power of the presidency.

=== Scotland ===
This covers the Kingdom of Scotland, which became part of the Kingdom of Great Britain after 1707. For constitutional crises since then, see United Kingdom below.

- The death of seven-year-old Queen Margaret in 1290 prompted a succession dispute involving thirteen claimants. The interim Guardians of Scotland asked King Edward I of England to arbitrate the dispute. Edward pursued his own interest in establishing lordship over Scotland by selecting claimant John Balliol in return for an oath of fealty. Scottish nobles rejected Edward's control, leading to the Wars of Scottish Independence and a 10-year vacancy of the throne.

=== Spain ===
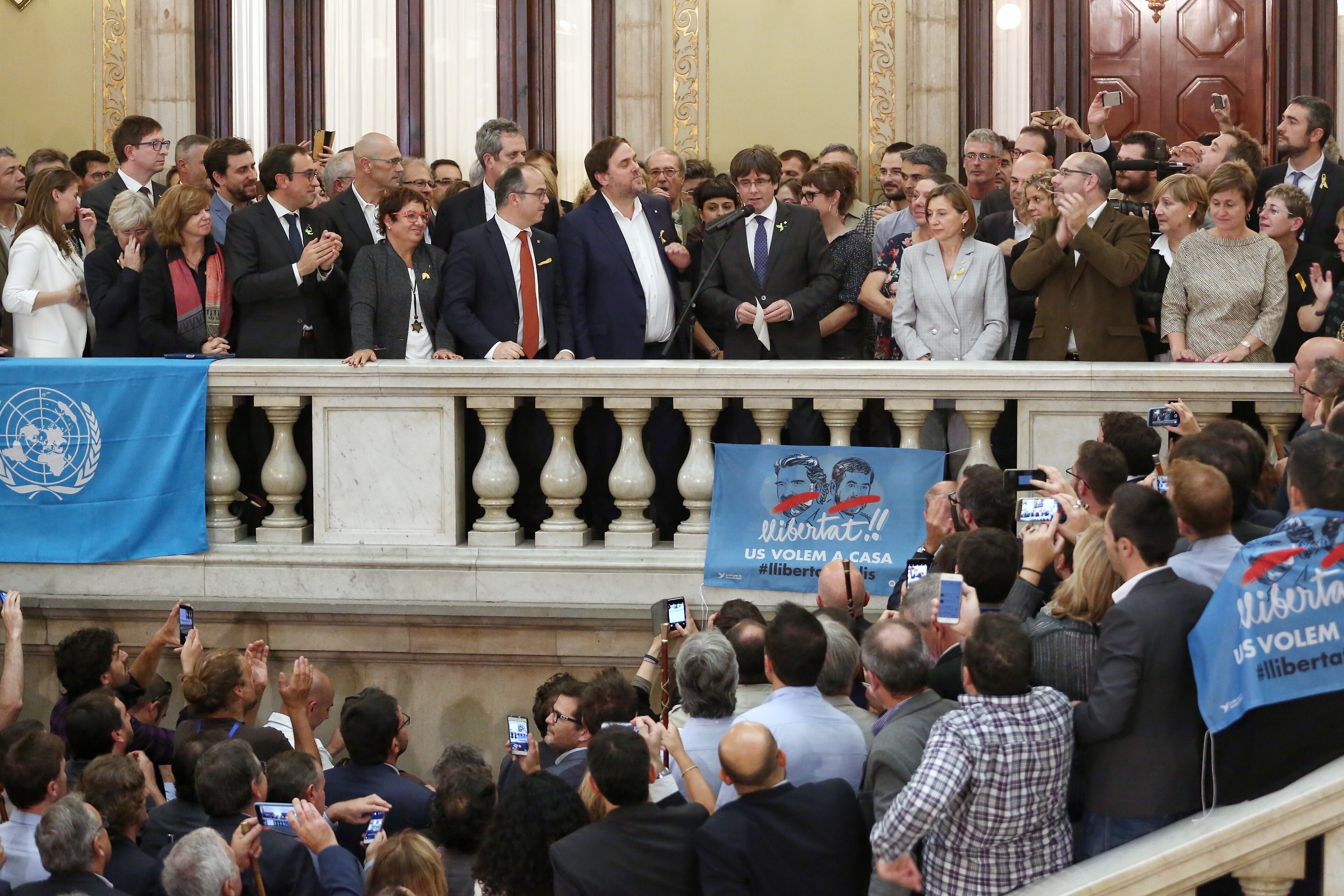
Catalan president, Carles Puigdemont, addresses the crowd following the unilateral declaration of independence on 27 October.

- 2017–18 Spanish constitutional crisis: The government of Catalonia under Carles Puigdemont held an independence referendum against instructions of the Spanish courts. The referendum passed by an overwhelming margin, albeit with limited voter participation, whereupon the Catalonian government declared independence. The Spanish government dissolved the Catalonian government, arrested pro-independence politicians and imposed direct rule from Madrid for more than half a year.

=== Turkey ===
- 2023 Turkish constitutional crisis

=== Ukraine ===
- 2020-2021 Ukrainian constitutional crisis: The Constitutional Court of Ukraine ruled much of Ukraine's 2014 anti-corruption reform unconstitutional, placing the country's foreign relations at risk.

=== United Kingdom ===
While the United Kingdom does not have a written constitution, it has an unwritten one.

- The regency crisis of 1788: A new Parliament was convened while King George III was unable, due to illness, to charge it with its responsibilities or to assent to any bills. Parliament nonetheless submitted an irregular bill that provided for George, Prince of Wales to act as regent, and the Lord Chancellor Lord Thurlow affixed the royal seal to it without the King's signature. This precedent was repeated in 1811 after the King again fell ill.
- The Bedchamber crisis between 1839 and 1841, after the 2nd Viscount Melbourne, a leading Whig politician, declared his intention to resign as Prime Minister of the United Kingdom after a government bill passed by a very narrow margin of only five votes in the House of Commons. The crisis occurred very early in the reign of Queen Victoria and involved her first change of government. She was partial to Lord Melbourne, and resisted the requests of his rival, Robert Peel, to replace some of her ladies-in-waiting, who were primarily from Whig-aligned families, with Conservative substitutes as a condition for forming a government. Following a few false moves toward an alternative Conservative prime minister and government, Melbourne was reinstated until the 1841 election, after which Peel was appointed Prime Minister and Victoria conceded to the replacement of six of her ladies-in-waiting.
- The House of Lords' rejection of the 1909 People's Budget, a proposal by Chancellor of the Exchequer David Lloyd George and President of the Board of Trade Winston Churchill entailing welfare reforms funded by taxes on landowners. This caused a two-year impasse, which ended after the Liberal Party won the January 1910 general election and the House of Lords ratified the law. However, the impasse resumed when Prime Minister H. H. Asquith introduced the Parliament Act permanently removing the House of Lords' veto over money bills and sharply limiting its veto over public bills, which the House of Lords blocked after the December 1910 general election ended in a hung parliament. King George V finally forced the House to ratify the law by threatening to end its Conservative majority by appointing hundreds of new peers.
- The 1936 Edward VIII abdication crisis, when King Edward VIII proposed to marry divorcee Wallis Simpson against the advice of his ministers. This was unacceptable to the leaders of the United Kingdom and the dominions because Simpson was twice divorced and the Church of England, of which Edward served as the head, forbade remarriage of divorcees if their spouses were still alive. Rather than ending their relationship the King chose to abdicate and his brother assumed the throne as King George VI.
- The 2019 British prorogation controversy in October 2019, when the Cabinet of Conservative Prime Minister Boris Johnson advised Queen Elizabeth II to prorogue the British Parliament for five weeks. The decision was taken during contentious parliamentary debate over the United Kingdom's impending withdrawal from the European Union. In the unanimous R (Miller) v The Prime Minister and Cherry v Advocate General for Scotland decisions, the Supreme Court of the United Kingdom unanimously found the prorogation to be unlawful as preventing the ability of Parliament to carry out its constitutional functions without reasonable justification. (Note: Attributed to multiple sources:)

== North America ==
=== Canada ===
- The King–Byng affair of 1926 occurred when Prime Minister William Lyon Mackenzie King, anticipating that his minority government would imminently lose a motion of no confidence, asked Governor General Lord Byng to hold a new federal election. Byng, who had viewed King's government as illegitimate on the basis of not being the largest party in Parliament, refused the request, dismissed King, and appointed opposition leader Arthur Meighen as Prime Minister, leading to accusations from King and other prominent politicians that he had overstepped the boundaries of his office by doing so. Meighen's new government lost a vote of no confidence within days, forcing an election in which King won close to a majority government and Meighen lost his parliamentary seat.
- The 1936 Edward VIII abdication crisis, when King Edward VIII proposed to marry divorcee Wallis Simpson against the advice of his ministers.
- In 1968, the government of Lester B. Pearson lost a vote on a tax bill, leading to several days of confusion over whether this counted as a Matter of Confidence in the government, which would have compelled Pearson to resign and call a new federal election. Governor General Roland Michener was eventually required to intervene and stated that he could not find a legal precedent for treating a tax bill as a matter of confidence, leading to opposition leader Robert Stanfield tabling an explicit motion of no confidence in Pearson's government, which the government won.

=== Honduras ===
- The 2009 Honduran constitutional crisis saw President Manuel Zelaya attempting to hold a non-binding referendum which Congress and the Supreme Court deemed unconstitutional. The Honduran Armed Forces, following orders from the Supreme Court, arrested President Zelaya.

=== United States ===
The Electoral Commission was a panel that resolved the disputed presidential election of 1876.

- The Nullification Crisis: Often viewed as a precursor to the U.S. Civil War, sectional divisions flared when the state of South Carolina declared the controversial and highly protective Tariff of 1828 and 1832 unconstitutional and therefore null and void within the sovereign boundaries of the state. South Carolina initiated military preparations to resist anticipated federal enforcement. Jackson eventually responded by signing the Force Bill to assert federal authority, and South Carolina agreed to the compromise Tariff of 1833.
- In 1841 presidential duties passed to Vice President John Tyler upon the death of President William Henry Harrison. The Constitution was unclear as to whether Tyler should assume the office of president or merely execute the duties of the vacant office. Tyler insisted that politicians recognize him as president and returned, unopened, all mail addressed otherwise. Despite opposition from some Whig members of Congress, including John Quincy Adams and Henry Clay, both houses passed a resolution confirming Tyler's position. This precedent was later codified in the Twenty-fifth Amendment.
- The secession crisis (1860–1861): Sectional divisions in the Democratic Party resulted in the election of Abraham Lincoln. Alarmed by Lincoln's intention to prohibit slavery in western territories, eleven southern slaveholding states withdrew from the federal union and formed a confederacy. Lincoln refused to recognize the secessions and restored the states to the union by force in the conclusion of the Civil War.
- 1876 presidential election: Republicans and Democrats disputed voting results in three states. An ad hoc Electoral Commission, created by Congress, voted along party lines in favor of Republican candidate Rutherford B. Hayes, in exchange for withdrawing federal troops from the South and ending Reconstruction.
- The assassination of James A. Garfield: President James A. Garfield was shot by Charles J. Guiteau in July 1881, and left bedridden and incapacitated in the months that followed. This resulted in much debate over whether to have Vice President Chester A. Arthur assume Garfield's duties, and the mechanism by which he might do so, given the Constitution's ambiguity over a situation in which the President was incapacitated, but not deceased. The cabinet eventually decided to wait and give Garfield the opportunity to recover, but his condition further deteriorated and he died in September 1881, leading to Arthur succeeding him. The Twenty-fifth Amendment later codified a procedure for dealing with an incapacitated president.
- The 1952 steel strike: President Harry S. Truman nationalized the country's steel industry on the basis of his inherent powers in order to prevent a strike by the United Steelworkers that would impede the Korean War. This action reopened the "Great Debate" of 1950–51 regarding the extent of Truman's authority to counter the spread of communism. The Supreme Court annulled Truman's order in Youngstown Sheet & Tube Co. v. Sawyer, holding that presidential actions must proceed from constitutional or legislative authority. Truman used the threat of a second nationalization to push steel workers and management to an agreement.
- In the Watergate scandal (1972–1974), President Richard Nixon and his staff obstructed investigations into their political activities. Nixon resigned, under threat of impeachment, after the release of an audio tape showing that he had personally approved the obstruction. Congressional moves to restrain presidential authority continued for years afterward.
- Some politicians and commentators have argued that actions taken by the administration of President Donald Trump in early 2025 have created a constitutional crisis, including attempts to shut down agencies, such as USAID, without congressional authorization, to refuse to spend money in ways appropriated by Congress, and to defy court orders. (Note: Attributed to multiple sources:)

==== Georgia ====
- Three governors controversy

==== New York ====
- 2009 New York State Senate leadership crisis

==== Pennsylvania ====
- In the 1838 elections, both the Whig and Democratic parties claimed control over the Pennsylvania House of Representatives. This resulted in the Buckshot War.

== Oceania ==
=== Australia ===
- The 1936 Edward VIII abdication crisis, when King Edward VIII proposed to marry divorcee Wallis Simpson against the advice of his ministers.
- The 1975 Australian constitutional crisis saw the Prime Minister Gough Whitlam and his government dismissed by the nation's Governor-General Sir John Kerr, in response to a prolonged budget deadlock in Parliament. Whitlam's Labor government had the confidence of the lower house, the House of Representatives. In the Australian Constitution, the Senate has equal powers with the House of Representatives, except it may not initiate or amend a supply bill. It can, however, reject or defer consideration of such a bill, and that is what it did on this occasion. The Constitution permits the Governor-General to dismiss the government if they cannot command the confidence of Parliament and will not call an election. Though the government lacked the confidence of the Senate, they commanded the confidence of the lower house, where government is formed, and confidence motions introduced. Whitlam also stated his intention to call an election, but Kerr nonetheless dismissed him without prior warning and installed Malcolm Fraser as Prime Minister, despite Fraser's inability to command the confidence of either house of Parliament. After Fraser's Liberal government passed several important appropriations bills, Kerr declared a double dissolution of Parliament and the 1975 federal election, which Fraser won in a landslide.
- In 2017, the eligibility of a number of Australian parliamentarians to sit in the Parliament of Australia was called into question because of their actual or possible dual citizenship. The issue arises from section 44 of the Constitution of Australia, which prohibits members of either house of the Parliament from having allegiance to a foreign power. Several MPs resigned in anticipation of being ruled ineligible, and five more were forced to resign after being ruled ineligible by the High Court of Australia, including National Party leader and Deputy Prime Minister Barnaby Joyce. This became an ongoing political event referred to variously as a "constitutional crisis" or the "citizenship crisis".

==== New South Wales ====
- The 1932 New South Wales constitutional crisis

=== Fiji ===
- In the Fiji constitutional crisis of 1977, the winning party in a general election failed to name a government due to internal conflicts. The Governor-General intervened, appointing a prime minister from the opposition party.

=== New Zealand ===
- The 1936 Edward VIII abdication crisis, when King Edward VIII proposed to marry divorcee Wallis Simpson against the advice of his ministers.
- The New Zealand constitutional crisis of 1984 was caused by Prime Minister Sir Rob Muldoon's refusal to devalue the New Zealand dollar as per the instructions of the Prime Minister-elect, David Lange. The outgoing cabinet rebelled against Muldoon, who relented. The crisis led to the passage of the Constitution Act, which patriated the constitution from the United Kingdom.

=== Papua New Guinea ===
- The Papua New Guinean constitutional crisis of 2011–2012 was caused by a disagreement, involving every branch of government including the Supreme Court, as to who the legitimate Prime Minister was. Specifically, whether Prime Minister Michael Somare's dismissal by the Speaker of the National Parliament while he was in hospital had been lawful. After ten months, the crisis was resolved peacefully by a general election.

=== Samoa ===
- The April 2021 Samoan general election resulted in legal challenges and a crisis.

=== Tuvalu ===
- The Tuvaluan constitutional crisis of 2013 occurred when Prime Minister Willy Telavi sought to continue governing after having lost his parliamentary majority. He deferred allowing Parliament to sit, and his ally Speaker Kamuta Latasi did not allow a motion of no confidence to be tabled when it finally did sit. The Opposition accused the government of acting unconstitutionally, and Governor General Sir Iakoba Italeli intervened, removing the Prime Minister from office so that Parliament could decide who should form the government. Telavi sought in vain to ask the Queen of Tuvalu, Elizabeth II, to remove the Governor General. Parliament elected Opposition Leader Enele Sopoaga to the premiership.

== South America ==
=== Chile ===
- 1973 Chilean coup d'état: Accusing Salvador Allende's government of increasing authoritarianism, the Supreme Court, Comptroller General and Chamber of Deputies declared him out of order, and the Chamber urged the military to put an end to constitutional breaches. The military deposed Allende a few weeks later and abolished the constitution.

=== Peru ===
- Peruvian Constitutional Crisis of 1992: President Alberto Fujimori, with the support of the armed forces, dissolved the Congress after it rejected his proposal for stronger action against Shining Path and MRTA. Then, he called for elections for a Democratic Constitutional Congress to write the 1993 Peruvian Constitution. Until the new constitution was written, he ruled by decree.

=== Venezuela ===
- 2017 Venezuelan constitutional crisis and Venezuelan presidential crisis: The constitutional chamber of the Supreme Tribunal of Justice ruled that the country's legislature, the National Assembly, was operating in contempt of the constitution due to prior rulings that some members had been improperly elected and assumed legislative power for itself. Politicians opposed to the government of President Nicolás Maduro, as well as Maduro's Prosecutor General, denounced the ruling for undermining the constitutional order, and the Tribunal rescinded it the following day. Maduro summoned a Constituent Assembly, nominally to draft a new constitution, but in practice to assert his authority against that of the National Assembly. After an irregular presidential election the following year, National Assembly President Juan Guaidó was recognized as interim president in opposition to Maduro, which he continued to claim through the end of 2022.
