= Charles M. White =

American steel industry executive (1891–1977)

Charles McElroy White
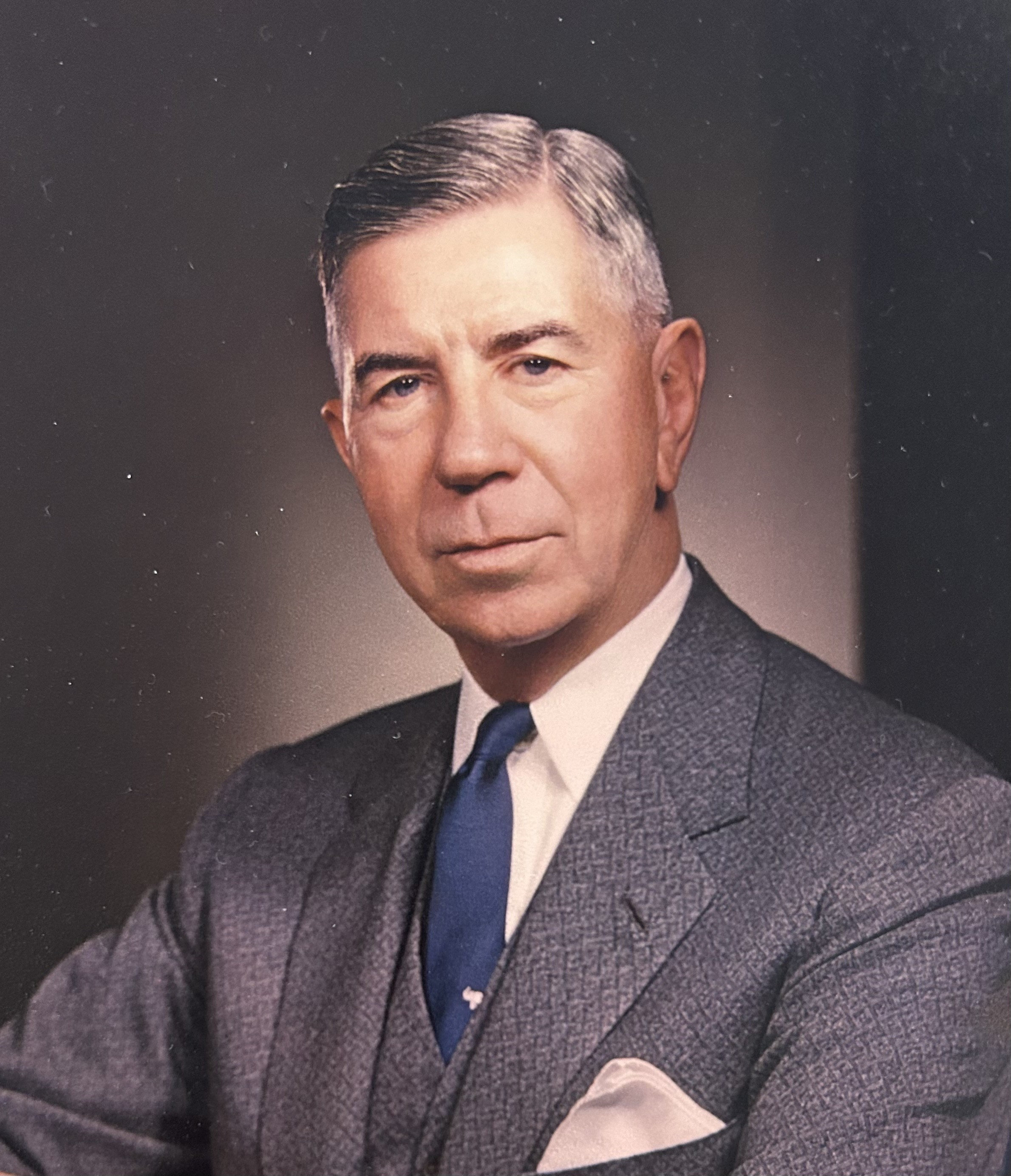
- Born: June 13, 1891; Oakland, Maryland, U.S.
- Died: January 10, 1977 (aged 85); Palm Beach, Florida, U.S.
- Occupation(s): President, Republic Steel (1945–1956); CEO and Chairman, Republic Steel (1956–1960)
- Years active: 1927–1966
- Spouse: Helen Bradley White

Charles McElroy White (June 13, 1891 – January 10, 1977) was an American steel manufacturing executive. He was a protégé of Tom M. Girdler, and was briefly superintendent of Jones and Laughlin Steel Company in 1929. He followed Girdler to the rapidly growing Republic Steel in 1930, where he was appointed president of the company in 1945. He was promoted to chairman of the board of directors and chief executive officer in 1956. He retired in 1960.

== Early life and career ==
Charles M. White was born in June 1891 in Oakland, Maryland, to Charles Franklin and Estella Virginia (Jarboe) White. He grew up in Hutton, Maryland, where his father operated a sawmill. He was educated in public school in Hutton, but did not graduate from high school. He started working in lumber camps when he was 12 years old, leading mules. By the age of 14, he was driving a four-horse team. Determined to earn money to attend college, he found employment as a construction worker on a railroad and in a tannery. He won admission to Maryland State College, where he graduated in 1913 with a bachelor's degree in mechanical engineering.

After graduation, White took a job with the American Bridge Company for two years as a millwright's helper. Over the next three years, he continued to take courses in chemistry, engineering, and metallurgy at the Carnegie Institute of Technology. White took a job with the Jones and Laughlin Steel Company in 1915, and within a year was superintendent of a sintering plant. In 1916, he was promoted to assistant superintendent of the blast furnace at Jones and Laughlin's Eliza Works in Pittsburgh, Pennsylvania. His position was reclassified in 1917 as a master mechanic. Two years later, he was promoted to the position of assistant to the superintendent of mechanical and construction work at J&L's South Side works.

In 1918, White married Helen Bradley. The couple had a daughter, Jean.

In 1920, Benjamin Franklin Jones Jr., chairman of the board of directors of Jones and Laughlin Steel, asked Tom M. Girdler (then Jones and Laughlin's General Manager) to take over the operation of the company's shortline railroads, which were inefficient and losing money. But United States antitrust law prevented Jones and Laughlin from directly controlling these railroads. Jones suggested that Girdler find a trusted associate to operate the shortline railroads, while Girdler secretly held the real decision-making power. Girdler turned to Charles M. White. White was promoted to operating manager of the Monongahela Connecting Railroad in 1920. He was soon given operating control of three other shortline railroads owned by Jones and Laughlin Steel, including the Aliquippa and Ohio River Railroad.

In 1927, White left J&L's railroad subsidiaries to become assistant superintendent of the company's Aliquippa Steel Works in Aliquippa, Pennsylvania. He was promoted to general superintendent of the plant in 1929, but served only a few months. In May 1930, White was appointed assistant vice president in charge of operations at Republic Steel.

Five years later, when Girdler was appointed president of Republic Steel, White was promoted to take over Girdler's role as vice president of operations.

== Republic Steel ==
White is best known for his years at Republic Steel. His early years at the company were marked by battles with labor unions, which he strenuously opposed. According to historian Irving Bernstein, under White it was Republic Steel's policy to use violence to oppose unionization.

While vice president of operations at Republic Steel, White oversaw the rapid expansion of the Republic Steel police force. This included putting the company police in uniforms, establishing a military-like hierarchy, and arming the previously weaponless force. White asserted in 1937 testimony before a subcommittee of the United States Senate Committee on Education and Labor that the men recruited for the police force were of the highest quality and received excellent training. But his subordinate, James L. Williams (superintendent of police at Republic Steel), contradicted White on both counts. White was also alleged to have agreed to use excess force in response to union organizing efforts. Republic Steel acquired Berger Manufacturing Co. in 1933. In a union organizing election held under the auspices of the National Labor Relations Act, workers at the plant voted to form a union in 1935. The union was certified as duly elected by the National Labor Relations Board. The workers struck in order to pressure Republic Steel to recognize and bargain with their union. White was present at the plant during the strike. Witnesses alleged before the Senate subcommittee that White permitted the Republic Steel police to use excessive amounts of tear and vomit gas, fire weapons indiscriminately into crowds, arm themselves with and use metal clubs on strikers and bystanders, and to venture far off company property into the surrounding streets at will. During the short strike, 28 people were hospitalized, seven people shot, and 110 sued Republic Steel for damages (which paid out $46,000 to settle these suits). Republic Steel president Rufus Wysor apologized for the "regettable riot" his company police caused. White's testimony before the subcommittee played down these incidents or denied that they occurred. The official subcommittee report questioned his credibility, declared his statements to be "a deliberate attempt to mislead the committee", and "specious and completely disingenuous".

During this testimony, White engaged in a now-famous exchange of words with Senator Robert M. La Follette Jr. White admitted to La Follette's committee that he had authorized the expenditure of $11,900 for tear gas and handguns in June 1935. When pressed to explain why, White said that the rule of law had broken down and mobs were seizing steel plants. La Follette scoffed at this claim, leading to the sarcastic exchange:

White: We all look very peaceful in this room, yet I see four policemen with side arms. If it is for my protection, I am grateful.
La Follette: We want you to feel in a home-like atmosphere.

White's response to numerous unionization attempts at Republic Steel facilities was vigorous. He approved a campaign of espionage, infiltration of unions, incitement to strikes and violence, physical intimidation, and "rough shadowing" (intimidation by openly following someone so that they know they are being followed and significantly alter their normal behavior thereby). In Senate testimony, White did not deny that he knew espionage and rough shadowing was being employed by company police under his supervision from 1935 to 1937. He later admitted before Congress that he signed several thousand dollars' worth of vouchers to pay for anti-unionization efforts. Between June 1933 and April 1937, Republic Steel spent $392,120 on these anti-union activities as well as a company union. Although White described his company's industrial relations as harmonious during this period, he authorized expenditures of $214,129 on strike activities.

In 1945, White was elected president of Republic Steel by the company's board of directors. He replaced Rufus Wysor, who retired. His replacement as vice president of operations was his assistant, E. M. Richards. In the post-war period, White continued to vocally oppose unionization of the steel industry. He called for right-to-work laws in the United States, and demanded repeal of the National Labor Relations Act.

In 1948, White embroiled Republic Steel in a major dispute with the Kaiser-Frazer company. During World War II, the federal government constructed a $28 million steel works near Cleveland, Ohio, to provide steel for the war effort. It leased this plant to Republic Steel. When the federal government began selling off its federally owned war plants in the late 1940s, it offered the plant to Republic Steel. But White refused to pay the asking price. The War Assets Administration then leased the plant to Kaiser-Frazer, which angered Republic Steel and led many in the steel industry to believe that Kaiser-Frazer would cut off pig iron supplies to the steel industry. White appealed to President Harry S. Truman, demanding that he terminate the lease. General Jess Larson, Administrator of the War Assets Administration, testified before Congress on August 25 that White had tried to bluff the federal government in order to get a lower price for the lease, and that the federal government walked away from the talks believing Republic was not bluffing. Two days later, Kaiser-Frazer agreed to continue to let Republic Steel operate the plant in return for a greater share of the pig iron produced by it.

Republic Steel was a target of the United Steelworkers (USW) during the 1952 steel strike. The Korean War had broken out on June 25, 1950, and the United States (which had rapidly demobilized after World War II) was poorly prepared to expand the production of war material. To keep inflation low during mobilization, Truman issued Executive Order 10161 on September 9. This order established the Wage Stabilization Board, but as production failed to meet national needs President Truman declared a national emergency on December 16, 1950. Negotiations between the USW and the steel industry opened in September 1951. On November 15, Benjamin Fairless, president of U.S. Steel, not only declared that the steel industry had no intention of reaching a collective bargaining agreement with the union but expressed his opinion that workers were overpaid by at least 30 percent. As the talks dragged on to mid-December without movement, the government began to take action. Economic Stabilization Agency administrator Roger Putnam summoned Fairless, Ernest T. Weir (president of National Steel Corporation), and White to Washington, D.C., on December 13. Although Putnam ruled out price relief based on a rise in wages, for the first time the government indicated it would permit steel manufacturers to seek the maximum price increase allowed by law. Despite lengthy negotiations, collective bargaining talks collapsed on April 4. Convinced that even a short strike would impair national defense, at 10:30 p.m. Eastern time on April 8 Truman announced that the federal government was seizing control of the nation's steel mills to ensure the continued production of steel. Twenty-seven minutes after the conclusion of Truman's speech, attorneys for Republic Steel and the Youngstown Sheet & Tube Company went to court seeking a permanent injunction against the executive order. On June 2, 1952, in a 6-to-3 ruling, the Supreme Court of the United States declared in Youngstown Sheet & Tube Co. v. Sawyer, 343 U.S. 579 (1952), that the president lacked the authority to seize the steel mills.

White strongly denounced the legal structure which led to the "steel seizure" case. In May 1952, speaking to the American Steel Warehouse Association, he declared, "This partnership between government and labor has been a disgrace to our country." He later accused Truman of not giving "a damn whether steel mills are opened to produce defense steel". His views changed little over the ensuing decade. In the late 1950s, White joined with Charles Hook of American Rolling Mills, J. J. Woodhall of Woodhall Industries, and Harry Bradley of Allen-Bradley in what labor historian Nelson Lichtenstein called "a revival of...right-wing, antilabor polemics". White was one of three wealthy backers of Senator William F. Knowland who distributed a pamphlet viciously attacking Walter Reuther, president of the United Auto Workers.

White pushed Republic Steel into the nuclear power industry in 1954. The company purchased a major rutile lode in southern Mexico, and began mining and refining titanium. The company also hired physicist Robert P. Petersen to advise it on strategic business opportunities in the nuclear power industry.

White was named chief executive officer of Republic Steel in 1955, and chairman of the board of directors in August 1956. In May 1959, White declared that the nation could weather a three-month steel strike without any problems. He proved incorrect. Republic Steel incurred financial losses which even White was forced to admit were "horrible". Steel supplies nationwide were so depleted that even high production rates at the end of 1959 had failed to alleviate severe shortages.

== Retirement and death ==
In 1960, at the age of 70, Charles M. White retired as chairman of Republic Steel. He remained on the board of directors until 1966, and was given the title of honorary chairman.

In retirement, White moved to Palm Beach, Florida. His health declined in his later years, and he died at his Florida home of unspecified causes on January 10, 1977. A lifelong Episcopalian, White was buried in Lake View Cemetery near his long-time home of Cleveland, Ohio.

== Other roles ==
White was elected a director of the Cleveland Trust Company in January 1955, and vice-chairman of The Conference Board in May 1956.

White was active in a number of charitable and community causes. He helped found the Boys Club of Cleveland and the Cleveland Development Foundation (an urban renewal organization). In 1955, the Cleveland Chamber of Commerce bestowed its medal for distinguished public service on him.

== Honors and legacy ==
White was given the 1938 American Iron and Steel Institute (AISI) Medal for his paper "Technological Advances in Steel Products", presented at the AISI meeting on May 27, 1937. The paper discussed advances in electric blast furnaces. He was given the American Society for Metals Research Medal for advances in steel production in October 1956. The AISI awarded him the Gary Memorial Medal, its highest honor, in 1961.

In 1952, a straight deck bulk carrier, the SS Charles M. White, built by the Great Lakes Engineering Works, was launched. It served on the Great Lakes for several decades.

White received an honorary doctorate in engineering from the University of Maryland in 1960. On May 14, 2003, the A. James Clark School of Engineering at the University of Maryland held the inaugural Charles and Helen White Symposium in Engineering.

== Bibliography ==
- Bernstein, Irving. The Turbulent Years: A History of the American Worker, 1933–1941. Reprint ed. Chicago, Ill.: Haymarket Books, 2010.
- Callcott, George H. A History of the University of Maryland. Baltimore, Md.: Maryland Historical Society, 1966.
- Current Biography Yearbook. New York: H.W. Wilson Company, 1950.
- Girdler, Tom M. and Sparkes, Boyden. Boot Straps: The Autobiography of Tom M. Girdler. New York: Scribner, 1943.
- Lichtenstein, Nelson. Walter Reuther: The Most Dangerous Man in Detroit. Urbana, Ill.: University of Illinois Press, 1995.
- Marcus, Maeva. Truman and the Steel Seizure Case: The Limits of Presidential Power. New York: Columbia University Press, 1977.
- Subcommittee on Senate Resolution 266. Violations of Free Speech and Rights of Labor: Hearings Before a Subcommittee of the Committee on Education and Labor. Private Police Systems. Report No. 6, Part 2. Committee on Education and Labor. United States Senate. 76th Cong., 1st sess. Washington, D.C.: U.S. Government Printing Office, February 13, 1939.
- Thompson, Mark L. Steamboats & Sailors of the Great Lakes. Detroit: Wayne State University Press, 1991.
- Wollman, David H. and Inman, Donald R. Portraits in Steel: An Illustrated History of Jones & Laughlin Steel Corporation. Kent, Ohio: Kent State University Press, 1999.
