= Bibliography of works on labor unions in the United States =

These are References for Labor unions in the United States.

== To 1900 ==
  - See also History of coal mining#Coal miners and unions
- Arnold, Andrew B. Fueling the Gilded Age: Railroads, Miners, and Disorder in Pennsylvania Coal Country (2014) Excerpt and text search
- Commons, John R. History of Labour in the United States - Vol. 2 1860-1896 (1918)
- Commons, John R. "American Shoemakers, 1648-1895: A Sketch of Industrial Evolution," Quarterly Journal of Economics 24 (November, 1909), 39–83. in JSTOR
- Grob, Gerald N. Workers and Utopia: A Study of Ideological Conflict in the American Labor Movement, 1865-1900 (1961)
- John P. Hall, "The Knights of St. Crispin in Massachusetts, 1869-1878," Journal of Economic History 18 (June, 1958), p 161-175
- Laslett, John H. M. Labor and the Left: A Study of Socialist and Radical Influences in the American Labor Movement, 1881-1924 (1970)
- Mandel, Bernard. Samuel Gompers: A Biography (1963)
- Orth, Samuel P. The Armies of Labor: A Chronicle of the Organized Wage-Earners (1919) short overview manybooks.net PDF
- Voss, Kim. The Making of American Exceptionalism: The Knights of Labor and Class Formation in the Nineteenth Century (1993)]
- Weir, Robert E. Beyond Labor's Veil: The Culture of the Knights of Labor (1996)
- Bibliography of online resources on railway labor in late 19th century

=== Primary sources ===
- Gompers, Samuel. Seventy Years of Life and Labor: An Autobiography (1925)

== 1900–1932 ==
  - See also History of coal mining#Coal miners and unions
- Bernstein, Irving. The Lean Years: A History of the American Worker, 1920-33 (1966)
- Brody, David. Labor in Crisis: The Steel Strike of 1919 (1965)
- Dubofsky, Melvyn and Warren Van Tine. John L. Lewis: A Biography (1986)
- Faue, Elizabeth. Community of Suffering & Struggle: Women, Men, and the Labor Movement in Minneapolis, 1915-1945 (1991)
- Fraser, Steve. Labor Will Rule: Sidney Hillman and the Rise of American Labor (1993)
- Gordon, Colin. New Deals: Business, Labor, and Politics, 1920-1935 (1994)
- Greene, Julie . Pure and Simple Politics: The American Federation of Labor and Political Activism, 1881-1917 (1998)
- Hooker, Clarence. Life in the Shadows of the Crystal Palace, 1910-1927: Ford Workers in the Model T Era (1997)
- Laslett, John H. M. Labor and the Left: A Study of Socialist and Radical Influences in the American Labor Movement, 1881-1924 (1970)
- Karson, Marc. American Labor Unions and Politics, 1900-1918 (1958)
- McCartin, Joseph A. ’Labor's Great War: The Struggle for Industrial Democracy and the Origins of Modern American Labor Relations, 1912-1921 (1997)
- Mandel, Bernard. Samuel Gompers: A Biography (1963)
- Meyer, Stephen. The Five Dollar Day: Labor Management and Social Control in the Ford Motor Company, 1908-1921 (1981)
- Mink, Gwendolyn. Old Labor and New Immigrants in American Political Development: Union, Party, and State, 1875-1920 (1986)
- Orth, Samuel P. The Armies of Labor: A Chronicle of the Organized Wage-Earners (1919) short overview
- Quint, Howard H. The Forging of American Socialism: Origins of the Modern Movement (1964)
- Warne, Colston E. ed. The Steel Strike of 1919 (1963), primary and secondary documents
- Zieger, Robert. Republicans and Labor, 1919-1929. (1969)

=== Primary sources ===
- Gompers, Samuel. Seventy Years of Life and Labor: An Autobiography (1925)

== 1932–1955 ==
- Bernstein, Irving. Turbulent Years: A History of the American Worker, 1933-1941 (1970)
- Campbell, D'Ann. "Sisterhood versus the Brotherhoods: Women in Unions" Women at War With America: Private Lives in a Patriotic Era (1984).
- Dubofsky, Melvyn and Warren Van Time John L. Lewis (1986).
- Faue, Elizabeth. Community of Suffering & Struggle: Women, Men, and the Labor Movement in Minneapolis, 1915-1945 (1991), social history
- Fraser, Steve. Labor Will Rule: Sidney Hillman and the Rise of American Labor (1993).
- Galenson, Walter. The CIO Challenge to the AFL: A History of the American Labor Movement, 1935-1941 (1960)
- Gordon, Colin. New Deals: Business, Labor, and Politics, 1920-1935 (1994)
- Jensen, Richard J. "The Causes and Cures of Unemployment in the Great Depression," Journal of Interdisciplinary History 19 (1989) p. 553-83
- Kennedy, David M. Freedom From Fear: The American People in Depression and War, 1929–1945. (1999) recent narrative.
- Lichtenstein, Nelson. Labor's War at Home: The CIO in World War II (2003)
- Miller, Sally M., and Daniel A. Cornford eds. American Labor in the Era of World War II (1995), essays by historians, mostly on California
- Seidman; Joel. Brotherhood of Railroad Trainmen: The Internal Political Life of a National Union (1962)
- Vittoz, Stanley. New Deal Labor Policy and the American Industrial Economy (1987)
- Zieger, Robert H. The CIO, 1935-1955 (1995)

=== Fair Employment FEPC ===
- William J. Collins, "Race, Roosevelt, and Wartime Production: Fair Employment in World War II Labor Markets," American Economic Review 91:1 (March 2001), pp. 272–286
- Andrew Edmund Kersten, Race, Jobs, and the War: The FEPC in the Midwest, 1941-46 (2000) online review
- Merl E. Reed. Seedtime for the Modern Civil Rights Movement: The President's Committee on Fair Employment Practice, 1941-1946 (1991)

=== Taft-Hartley and the NLRA ===
- Abraham, Steven E. "The Impact of the Taft-Hartley Act on the Balance of Power in Industrial Relations" American Business Law Journal Vol. 33, 1996
- Ballam, Deborah A. "The Impact of the National Labor Relations Act on the U.S. Labor Movement" American Business Law Journal, Vol. 32, 1995
- Brooks, George W., Milton Derber, David A. McCabe, Philip Taft. Interpreting the Labor Movement (1952)
- Gilbert J. Gall, The Politics of Right to Work: The Labor Federations as Special Interests, 1943-1979 (1988)
- Fred A. Hartley Jr. and Robert A. Taft. Our New National Labor Policy: The Taft-Hartley Act and the Next Steps (1948)
- Lee, R. Alton. Truman and Taft-Hartley: A Question of Mandate (1966)
- Harry A. Millis and Emily Clark Brown. From the Wagner Act to Taft-Hartley: A Study of National Labor Policy and Labor Relations (1950)

=== Walter Reuther and UAW ===
==== Secondary sources ====
- Boyle, Kevin. The UAW and the Heyday of American Liberalism, 1945-1968 (1995)
- Kornhauser, Arthur et al. When Labor Votes: A Study of Auto Workers (1956)
- Lichtenstein, Nelson. The Most Dangerous Man in Detroit: Walter Reuther and the Fate of American Labor (1995)
- Lichtenstein, Nelson and Stephen Meyer, eds. On the Line: Essays in the History of Auto Work (1989)

==== Primary sources ====
- Christman, Henry M. ed. Walter P. Reuther: Selected Papers (1961)

== Since 1955 ==
- Fantasia, Rick, & Kim Voss. Hard Work: Remaking the American Labor Movement (2004)
- Galenson, Walter. The American Labor Movement, 1955-1995 (1996)
- Goldberg; Arthur J. AFL-CIO, Labor United (1956)
- Goldfield, Michael, and Amy Bromsen. "The Changing Landscape of US Unions in Historical and Theoretical Perspective." Annual Review of Political Science (2013) 16: 231-257.
- Leiter, Robert D. The Teamsters Union: A Study of Its Economic Impact (1957)
- Lichtenstein, Nelson. "Labour, liberalism, and the democratic party: a vexed alliance." Relations Industrielles/Industrial Relations (2011): 512-534. online
- Mort, Jo-Ann, ed. Not Your Father's Union Movement: Inside the AFL-CIO (2002)
- Rosenfeld, Jake, and Meredith Kleykamp. "Organized Labor and Racial Wage Inequality in the United States1." American Journal of Sociology (2012) 117#5 pp: 1460-1502.
- Steier, Richard. Enough Blame to Go Around: The Labor Pains of New York City's Public Employee Unions (2014)
- Warren, Dorian T. "The American labor movement in the age of Obama: the challenges and opportunities of a racialized political economy." Perspectives on Politics (2010) 8#3 pp: 847–860.
