= 1946 United States steel strike =

Industry-wide strike

1946 US steel strike
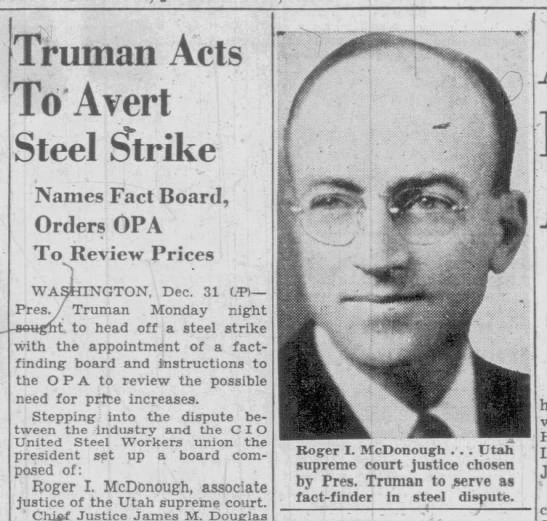
- Date: January 21, 1946 – April 1946
- Location: United States
- Caused by: Industry refusal to grant 25¢ an hour wage increase.
- Result: Industry wide 18½ ¢ an hour (~17%) wage increase. Government allowance of $5 a ton increase in steel prices for steel industry

Parties
| United Steelworkers | Steel Industry | US Government |

Lead figures
| Philip Murray | | Harry Truman; Chester Bowles |

Number
| ~750,000 | | |

The 1946 US steel strike was a several months long strike of 750,000 steel workers of the United Steelworkers union. It was a part of larger wave of labor disputes, known as the US strike wave of 1945–1946 after the end of World War II, and remains the largest strike in US history.

The strike started on January 21, 1946, after failed negotiations and fully ended by April, after the steel industry agreed to a wage increase of 18½ ¢ an hour for steel workers in individual agreements.

== Background ==
On October 29, 1945, while president Truman was holding a White House conference between labor unions and business owners, the United Steel Workers (an affiliate of the CIO) filed with the government for a strike vote, covering their 750,000 members. The union called for a $2 a day wage increase, which was unreceptively received by steel companies. On November 28, the steel workers voted 5 to 1 in favor of striking if companies refused to provide the wage increase.

On December 13, It was reported that a steel strike would likely have massive effects. Since even before the strike, steel supplies and stockpiles had dwindled, as a result of WWII measures and its end. Steel customers who pre-emptively ordered steel in preparation for the strike were expected to be unable to receive them in time, as the orders had led to large backlogs.

On December 31, Truman named a steel fact finding board in hopes of resolving the dispute. He also ordered the Office of Price Administration (OPA) to determine if increases in steel prices would be justified by February 1, 1946. The fact finding board was expected to finish its report by February 10. Which conflicted with the union's expected strike date of January 14. Alongside this Truman also appealed for the union to delay its strike till the board finished its report on February 10.

The union initially refused to delay the strike for the board. However, on January 5, the union & company agreed to return to collective bargaining on January 10. Negotiations were extended to January 20, after which if an agreement was not made a strike would occur.

Reportedly at the time, the union wanted to exercise and test its power following the end of World War 2, while the companies were eager to try to break and destroy the union.

At the time, Philip Murray, President of the CIO and part of negotiations, charged in a Washington Post interview that the industry intended,

"to destroy labor unions, to provoke strikes and economic chaos and to mulct the American people through un-controlled profits and inflation..."

Truman had proposed an hourly wage increase of 18½ cents. This differed from the original union demand of a 25¢/hour increase and industry initial offer of a 15¢/hour increase. The union accepted this proposed wage.

The government also had planned a $4 per ton increase (against recommendations by OPA) in the price of steel for the industry, which would have fully offset any extra costs from 18½ cents wage increase. The industry had requested a $7/ton increase. Negotiations broke down, and industry refused any wage increases barring greater concessions, after the planned $4 a ton increase became known to the steel industry.

Facing an impending strike in two days, Chester B. Bowles advised Truman to seize the steel mills. This was based partially on the wide public support shown when the government seized oil refineries (Note: On October 4, 1945) and a meatpacking plant (Note: In December, 1945) in 1945, when they each faced strikes. Truman feared steel executive's might interfere and embarrass the government, so he refused.

Earlier Bowle had predicted that the offer of $4 would prompt the steel industry to demand more.

== Strike ==
January 31, 1946
- "Americas Steel Strike" -Official AP News archive

The strike began on January 21, 1946. 750,000 workers struck, running pickets in the cold outside the steel plants. It spanned 29 states (Note: California, Massachusetts, New York, Alabama, Arkansas, Colorado, Connecticut, Delaware, Georgia, Illinois, Indiana, Kentucky, Maryland, Michigan, Montana, New Hampshire, New Jersey, North Carolina, Ohio, Oklahoma, Pennsylvania, Rhode Island, Tennessee, Texas, Utah, Virginia, and Wisconsin.) shutting down nearly all plants within the country. It remains the biggest strike in US history.

On February 15, an agreement to end the strike for 125,000 of the 750,000 steel workers, who worked for the five major steel companies ("Big Steel") was reached. It was agreed to end it on Sunday, February 17 on the basis of a 18½ cents/hour wage increase. This raised the base wage from 78¢/hour to 96½ ¢/hour, a ~17% wage change.

The rest of the industry consisting of smaller steel companies was expected to quickly follow suit. In this agreement the steel companies were also allowed a $5 instead of the previously set $4 a ton increase in steel prices. The steel companies also agreed to a clause of a retroactive pay increase of 9¼ cents for work conducted between January 1 and February 17.

At one point before the settlement, Bowles, whose relative popularity was used by Truman, had threatened to resign after the agreement largely drawn by him was modified to be more accommodating to industry. However, he ultimately decided to stay on, and was only able to get a few changes to the wage-price order due to the fighting for it by his loyal staff.

The next day, ~550,000 workers had come to covered agreements, largely following the 18½ ¢ wage increase and returning to work that Monday. Most of the workers with the basic steel industry, 400,000 of the 452,000 basic steel workers, would be returning. Over the next two months, individual agreements were made within the smaller companies, often following the set terms, till eventually all workers had returned.

Further companies agreed to the terms on February 18. On February 19, U.S. Steel announced it would be raising the wages of its 47,000 salaried and supervisor employees that had not been involved in the strike, which only involved production workers, as well.

February 25, 1946
- "Steel Strike in USA Ends" -Official AP News archive

By February 23, steel had reached 25% output, in part due to the difficulty of fully restarting furnaces in order to reach full capacity.

On March 4, around 250,000 steel workers were still on strike. On March 8, the National Wage Stabilization Board approved matching wage increases of 18½ cents for all salaried 'white collar' employees in the steel industry, for those that earned less the $5,000 a year. By March 12, the steel industry had reached 83.6% capacity. That month the steel industry complained the $5 a ton increase in price was inadequate to account for the wage increase.

== See also ==
- 1952 steel strike
- List of US strikes by size
