= United States strike wave of 1945–1946 =

Labor unrest following World War II

The US strike wave of 1945–1946 or great strike wave of 1946 were a series of massive post-war labor strikes after World War II from 1945 to 1946 in the United States spanning numerous industries including the motion picture (Hollywood Black Friday) and public utilities. In the year after V-J Day, more than five million American workers were involved in strikes, which lasted on average four times longer than those during the war. They were the largest strikes in American labor history. Other strikes occurred across the world including in Europe and colonial Africa. These strikes sparked national debate about labor rights, government intervention, and economic recovery.

== Background ==
Throughout the Second World War, the National War Labor Board gave trade unions the responsibility for maintaining labor discipline in exchange for closed membership. This led to acquiescence on the part of labor leaders to businesses and various wildcat strikes on the part of the workers. The strikes were largely a result of tumultuous postwar economic adjustments; with 10 million soldiers returning home, and the transfer of people from wartime sectors to traditional sectors, inflation was 8% in 1945, 14% in 1946, and 8% in 1947. Many of the protests from 1945 to 1946 were for better pay and working hours, but only one study done by Jerome F. Scott and George C. Homans of 118 strikes in Detroit from 1944 to 1945, found that only four were for wages, with the rest being for discipline and company policies or firings. The strike wave was marked by a relatively low incidence of violence involving workers and their unions. It contributed notably to the structure of postwar industrial relations and to the range of social and economic strategies open to the labor movement.

== The strikes ==
Large strikes in 1945 included:

- 10,500 film crew workers (March 1945)
- 43,000 oil workers (October 1945)
- 320,000 United Auto Workers (November 1945)

In 1946, strikes increased:

- 174,000 electric workers (January 1946)
- 93,000 meatpackers (January 1946)
- 750,000 steel workers (January 1946)
- 340,000 coal miners (April 1946)
- 250,000 railroad engineers and trainmen (May 22–25, 1946)
- 120,000 miners, rail and steel workers in the Pittsburgh region. (December 1946)

Others included strikes of railroad workers and general strikes in Lancaster, Pennsylvania; Stamford, Connecticut; Rochester, New York; and Oakland, California. In total, 4.3 million workers participated in the strikes. According to Jeremy Brecher, they were "the closest thing to a national general strike of industry in the twentieth century."

The United Auto Workers (U.A.W.) strike against General Motors was influential both politically and strategically. This strike started in November of 1945 and got nationwide attention. Launching additional strikes, including the largest one, the steelworkers' strike. The U.A.W. strike's main goal was to increase wages and for General Motors to make its finances public. At the time, General Motors was one of the largest companies, if not the largest, in the world, which made the strike that much more impactful. President Truman was against the strikes and insisted that the strikers get back to work, however, they denied his demands. They continued to strike until General Motors came to an agreement and gave a wage increase and better benefits three months later. This strike was not a full success, however, it did end with an agreeable adjustment and a cornerstone for labor unions.

The railroad strikes of 1946 not only affected the transit of thousands of civilians but also the transportation of goods. This marks the line where President Truman had had enough with strikes and threatened to have the army take operation of the freight trains. The day after his announcement, the workers came to an agreement with the president and the strike was over.

Strikes were resolved in a number of ways including direct negotiations from companies, government interjection, firing of workers, or business closures. The most common in 1946 being aid from government agencies.

== Aftermath ==
Number of striking workers each year, after 1946.

In 1947, Congress responded to the strike wave by enacting, over President Truman's veto, the Taft–Hartley Act, restricting the powers and activities of labor unions. The act is still in force as of 2026.

The 1945–1946 strike wave in the United States was one of the largest labor movements in American history, involving over five million workers across various industries. The strikes were driven by postwar economic instability, inflation, and demands for better wages and working conditions.

- Legislative Response: In 1947, Congress passed the Taft-Hartley Act, which significantly restricted labor unions' powers. This law, enacted over President Truman’s veto, imposed limitations on strikes and required union leaders to sign anti-communist affidavits.
- Political Shift: The strike wave contributed to a shift in public sentiment, leading to the election of a Republican-controlled Congress in 1946. Many voters believed the strikes were politically motivated, prompting stricter labor regulations.

The strike wave was a defining moment in U.S. labor history, shaping industrial relations for decades.

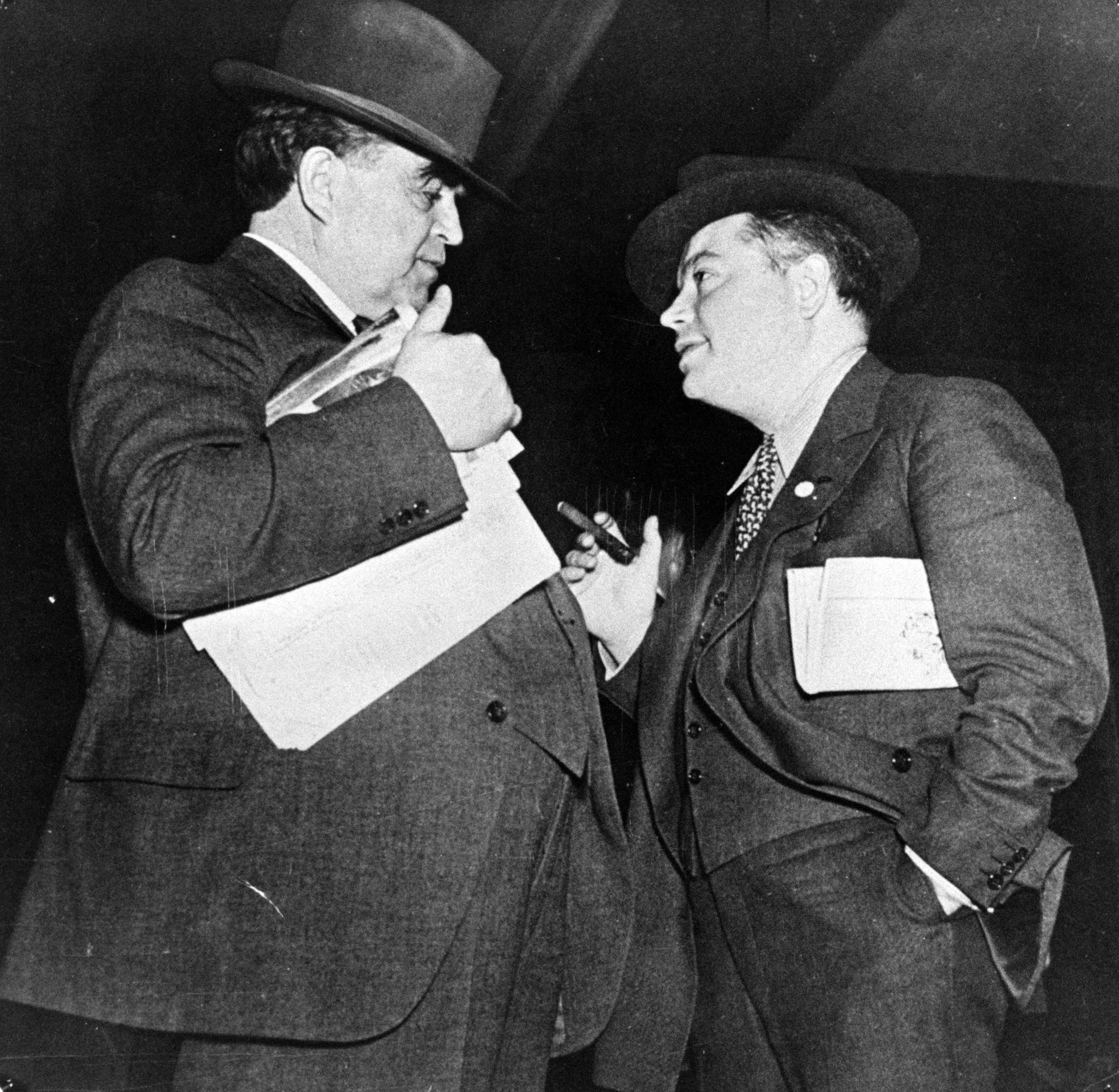
A captured moment of conversation between John L. Lewis, labor leader, and David Dubinsky, labor leader and politician.

The strike wave also caused a rally in support for the Labour Party, prior to the 1945 United Kingdom general election.

== See also ==
- List of US strikes by size
- Strike wave of 1919
- Striking US workers by year
- Winter of Discontent, similar period of widespread strikes in 1978–1979 Great Britain that led to the election of a Conservative government that passed new restrictions on union activities
- 1946 Korean general strike
