= Constitutional crisis in Turkey =

Argument inside Turkish legal system in 2023

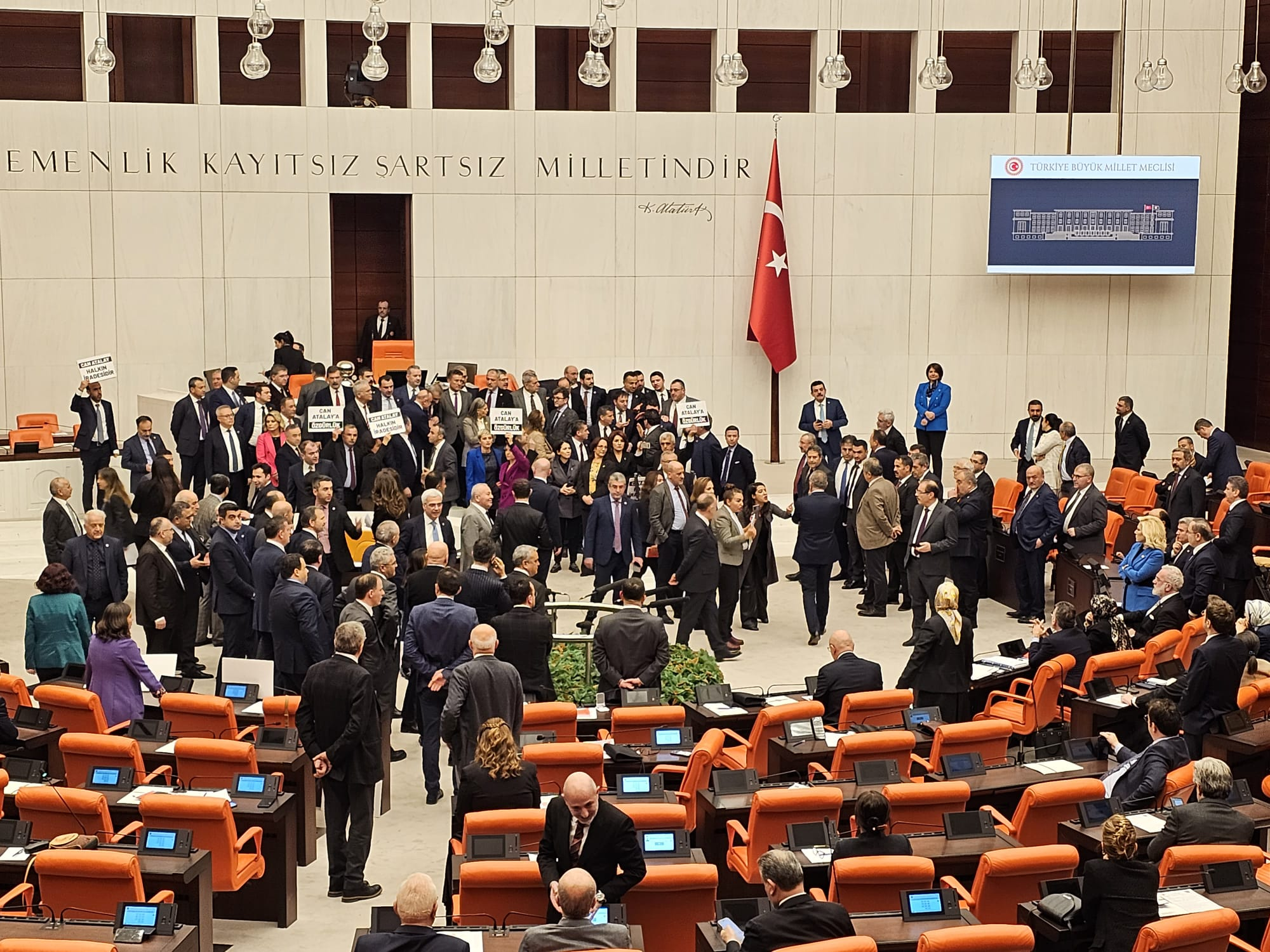
Turkish Grand National Assembly after Can Atalay decision

On 8 November 2023 a constitutional crisis unfolded in Turkey between the Court of Cassation and the Constitutional Court when the Court of Cassation intervened to overturn a ruling by the Constitutional Court regarding the release of an imprisoned member of the Turkish Parliament, Can Atalay.

The Constitutional Court had previously ordered the release of Atalay, asserting that his imprisonment infringed upon his rights to security, liberty, and the right to be elected. However the Court of Cassation annulled this decision, instructing lower courts not to abide by it. Furthermore, the appeals court called for a criminal investigation into the Constitutional Court members, alleging that their ruling constituted a violation of the constitution.

The opposition parties and the Union of Turkish Bar Associations called this action a "judicial coup attempt". Additionally, certain executives within the ruling Justice and Development Party criticised the Court of Cassation's ruling. The new leader of the main opposition Republican People's Party, Özgür Özel, called the ruling "a coup attempt against the constitutional order." He further emphasized the significance of the situation, stating, "I called our parliamentary group to an extraordinary closed meeting on the latest developments in the judiciary. The developments cannot be underestimated or ignored. Beyond the crime of violating the Constitution, this is an attempt to oppose the constitutional order. It should be suppressed immediately."
