= 1952 steel strike =

Strike by the United Steelworkers of America for higher wages

1952 Steel Strike
- Part of Labor Unions
- Date: April 9 – July 24, 1952 (74 years ago)
- Location: United States

Parties
United Steelworkers of America	Steel Industry

Number
560,000	

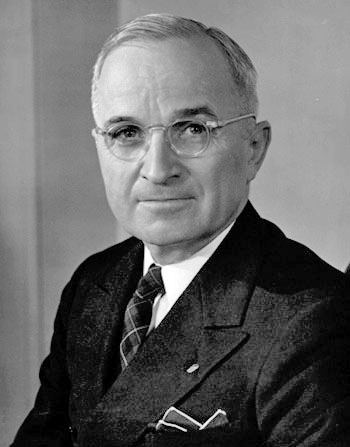
Soon after US President Harry Truman had nationalized the steel industry, the US Supreme Court decided that he lacked the authority.

The 1952 steel strike was a strike by the United Steelworkers of America (USWA) against U.S. Steel (USS) and nine other steelmakers. The strike was scheduled to begin on April 9, 1952, but US President Harry Truman nationalized the American steel industry hours before the workers walked out. The steel companies sued to regain control of their facilities. On June 2, 1952, in a landmark decision, the US Supreme Court ruled in Youngstown Sheet & Tube Co. v. Sawyer, 343 U.S. 579 (1952), that the President lacked the authority to seize the steel mills. The strike involved 560,000 workers.

The Steelworkers struck to win a wage increase. The strike lasted 53 days and ended on July 24, 1952, on essentially the same terms that the union had proposed four months earlier.

== Wage control policy during the Korean War ==
On February 9, 1950, Senator Joseph McCarthy denounced the Truman administration for permitting known communists to remain in the employment of the federal government. The incident sparked a four-year period of anticommunist policies and attitudes, which came to be known as McCarthyism. The accusations by McCarthy and others put the administration on the political defensive and led him to seek ways in which he might prove he was not "soft on communism."

On June 25, 1950, North Korea invaded South Korea, touching off the Korean War. American wartime mobilization agencies, including the recently formed National Security Resources Board (NSRB), were dormant. Truman attempted to use the NSRB as the nation's military mobilization agency. He quadrupled the defense budget to $50 billion, and the NSRB placed controls on prices, wages, and raw materials. Inflation soared and shortages in food, consumer goods, and housing appeared.

On September 8, 1950, the US Congress enacted the Defense Production Act. Title II permitted the President to requisition any facilities, property, equipment, supplies, and component parts of raw materials that were needed for the national defense. Title IV gave the President the authority to impose wage and price controls in progressive steps (ranging from voluntary controls to controls in essential industries to overall controls).

On September 9, Truman issued Executive Order 10161, which established the Economic Stabilization Agency (ESA) to coordinate and supervise wage and price controls. Using the wage and price control model developed in World War II, the Truman administration created two subagencies in ESA. The Office of Price Stabilization (OPS) was given the power to regulate prices, and the Wage Stabilization Board (WSB) oversaw the creation of wage stabilization rules. The division of labor was specifically designed to unlink wages from prices. If prices rose automatically with wages, the inflationary spiral would continue unabated. Placing the onus solely on workers to keep wages low risked the wrath of labor, a lesson that the administration had learned from the World War II experience. Delinking wages and prices leveled the playing field. Both workers and employers would now be forced to justify, independently, the wages and prices that they demanded.

By October 1950, inflation had abated, and shortages were easing. Although Truman had named Alan Valentine as ESA administrator and Cyrus S. Ching chairman of the WSB, the ESA and its subagencies were largely inactive, and the President hesitated to name a director for the Office of Price Stabilization.

China entered the war on behalf of North Korea on October 19 and made contact with American troops on October 25. The intervention of China in the Korean War unraveled the administration's mobilization effort. A panicked public began hoarding and the administration accelerated its rearmament plans, and the economy went into an upward inflationary spiral. By December, public support for the war had fallen significantly, and Truman and his intelligence experts expected World War III to break out by spring.

Confronted with the failure of the NSRB and a mobilization effort that was faltering and unable to meet the needs of accelerated production plans, Truman declared a national emergency on December 16, 1950. The declaration of an emergency was, in part, motivated by the McCarthyite attacks on the administration and Truman's desire to appear strong in the prosecution of the war. Using the powers granted to him by the Defense Production Act, which had been enacted only in September 1950, Truman created the Office of Defense Mobilization (ODM). Truman moved the ESA under ODM and nominated Michael DiSalle as the director of OPS.

== Organized labor's conflict with WSB ==
Unions felt that during World War II, the National War Labor Board had unfairly held wages below the level of inflation but done little to rein in corporate profits. The American Federation of Labor (AFL) and the Congress of Industrial Organizations (CIO) as well as independent labor unions were determined to avoid a similar outcome under the new Wage Stabilization Board. On December 20, 1950, a United Labor Policy Committee (ULPC), composed of representatives of the AFL, CIO, the Railway Labor Executives' Association (a group of railway labor unions), and the International Association of Machinists, was formed to influence the WSB's deliberations on wage stabilization policy. The group demanded a yearly cost-of-living adjustment for all contracts, productivity pay increases linked to company profit margins, and price controls, but the WSB's public and corporate representatives were in agreement that the board should focus only wages and strictly control them to keep inflation in check.

On January 26, 1951, the ESA imposed nationwide wage and price controls. Labor representatives, who opposed wholesale wage controls, were outvoted nine to three.

Labor representatives on the WSB charged that they were being frozen out of policy deliberations, and they threatened to resign unless they were given more influence over the process. Ching resigned on February 9 to head off a mass resignation, and ESA Administrator Johnston appointed the president of the Brotherhood of Railway and Steamship Clerks as his special assistant a day later, but the United Labor Policy Committee members were not placated.

Labor representatives believed that wage controls were particularly unfair to some workers. Some workers had received very high wage increases in 1950, before the imposition of wage controls, but others had yet to negotiate contracts or receive wage increases. Labor representatives demanded a 12 percent wage increase for workers who had not yet negotiated contracts under the wage stabilization policy, but the public and corporate members of the board held to a 10 percent increase.

On February 16, the Wage Stabilization Board issued Wage Regulation 6, which permitted a 10% increase in wages for workers who had not negotiated a wage increase in the last six months. The regulation was based on the "Little Steel formula" of World War II. Labor representatives of the board resigned in protest. The mass resignations set off a crisis within the administration. Unwilling to alienate labor by imposing wage controls involuntarily, Truman appointed a National Advisory Board on Mobilization Policy to come up with recommendations to win labor's support for wage and price controls. On April 17, the National Advisory Board suggested re-establishing the WSB with a greatly-enlarged membership. The National Advisory Board also recommended giving the WSB the power to intervene in labor disputes. The WSB should have the power, the report said, to make economic and noneconomic recommendations in labor disputes as well as to submit disputes directly to the president.

President Truman re-established the WSB on April 21, 1951. In Executive Order 10233, Truman gave the new board the recommended expanded powers. Dr. George W. Taylor, professor of industrial relations at the University of Pennsylvania, was tapped to be the WSB chairman. Taylor agreed to serve only until September 1, 1951, however, and he was succeeded by Nathan Feinsinger, a professor of law at the University of Wisconsin.

The expanded powers of the WSB created some controversy, however. It was not clear what statutory authority gave Truman the power to provide the board with its expanded powers. Congressional hearings over the reconstituted WSB's powers occurred since Congress also debated renewing the Defense Production Act. In July 1951, under pressure from numerous industries for price control relief, Congress enacted the Capehart Amendment to the DPA, which authorized companies to win price increases for costs incurred between June 1950 and July 26, 1951. Although opposed to the way in which the Capehart Amendment significantly weakened the administration's wage and price control program, Truman signed the legislation on July 31, 1951.

== Buildup to steel mill seizure ==
The Capehart Amendment put intense pressure on the Truman administration's inflation program. On August 8, the federal government imposed stricter economic controls on the economy. In the steel industry, production quotas and procurement orders were extended to all civilian steelmakers, not only large manufacturers. Steel companies had reported record and near-record profits in the summer, but by mid-fall, net revenues were down as defense needs consumed more and more and finished steel, and steelmakers were unable to sell steel to the higher-margin civilian market. On September 4, DPA again increased the amount of steel needed for defense use by sharply scaling down allotments for the civilian economy. When steelmakers balked at expanding plant and equipment to meet new defense quotas, ODM officials ordered the chief executives of the nation's largest steel manufacturers to attend a meeting in Washington at which they were threatened with additional government regulation and oversight. The steelmakers quickly acceded to the government's demands.

Stabilization officials were so upset by the Capehart Amendment that many resigned, leaving the agency almost leaderless at critical times. ESA Administrator Johnston announced his retirement on September 2 and quit on November 30. The job remained open until Truman persuaded Roger Putnam, a Massachusetts businessman and former Democratic mayor of Springfield, to accept the position on November 27.

Tensions also ruptured labor's united front on the Wage Stabilization Board. The ULPC dissolved on August 14 when the AFL pulled out of the joint committee. AFL officials appeared to be upset that the ULPC had not led to additional unity talks between the two labor groups and that CIO officials were obtaining more than their fair share of federal appointments. By October, organized labor's influence throughout the defense mobilization bureaucracy had significantly waned.

== Negotiations ==
The Steelworkers indicated on September 22 that they would seek an industry-wide rather than company-by-company approach to the upcoming wage negotiations. Union leaders argued that employers would never voluntarily agree to a collective bargaining agreement because there would be no guarantee that a concomitant price increase would occur. Philip Murray, USWA and CIO President, told the press that he assumed the wage dispute would end up in the hands of the Wage Stabilization Board, and the union was actively working to convince the WSB to alter its pay regulations to permit a pay increase in the 10 to 15 cents an hour range rather than the permissible 4 cents an hour. The consensus was that the WSB would permit steelworkers' wages to rise rather than risk a strike.

The first indication of what the employer position was in the upcoming negotiations became known on October 25, when the chairman of Bethlehem Steel indicated steelmakers would make no wage proposal when talks opened. Furthermore, the company made it known that it had seen a significant fall in profits and that it lacked any financial ability to award a pay increase.

Negotiations opened with U.S. Steel on November 1, 1951. The union bargaining team numbered more than 100 individuals. Organized labor representatives on the Wage Stabilization Board immediately began pressing for a change in the WSB's wage regulations to permit a higher wage increase, but administration officials balked. On November 15, Benjamin Fairless, president of U.S. Steel, not only declared that the steel industry had no intention of reaching a collective bargaining agreement with the union but expressed his opinion that workers were overpaid by at least 30 percent. Negotiations with Youngstown Sheet and Tube, Bethlehem Steel and some smaller steelmakers opened on December 1. The union asked for a "substantial" wage increase, overtime pay for Saturday and Sunday work, the union shop, eight days of vacation a year, relaxed rules on when workers could take vacation, and higher wages for night work. U.S. Steel, the industry leader, refused to address economic issues and instead on December 5 proposed changes to seniority, grievance procedures and other minor issues. Employers' refusal to discuss economic proposals angered union leaders.

As the talks dragged on to mid-December without movement, the government began to take action. ESA administrator Roger Putnam summoned to Washington, D.C., Fairless, Ernest T. Weir (president of National Steel Corporation), and Charles M. White (president of Republic Steel). The three met with Putnam on December 13, who attempted to determine what the employers' bargaining position was. Although Putnam ruled out price relief based on a rise in wages, for the first time he and OPS director DiSalle indicated that the government would permit the steel manufacturers to seek the maximum price increase allowed by the Capehart Amendment. Cyrus Ching, now head of the Federal Mediation and Conciliation Service, sent two of his top aides to meet with union officials to determine the union's bargaining strategy and timeline. The aides met with Murray and the union's collective bargaining committee on December 14, but made no headway. WSB director Feinsinger, however, began paving the way for a relaxation of Wage Regulation 6. On December 8, Feinsinger told the press that the Board was already working on a revision to the regulation which would permit merit pay increases. Five days later, Feinsinger let it be known that a number of economic issues (such as increased pension contributions) might be removed from the calculation of the basic wage rate in order to relieve the pressure on the negotiating parties.

Although the Steelworkers would be taking a strike vote on December 17, The New York Times reported on that same day that the union would consider postponing its strike. The union's strike committee declined to give Murray the authority to sign a wage pact without approval of the union's membership, and set its next meeting for January 3, 1952. The strike committee's action, requested by Murray, was designed to make calling off a strike much more difficult and thus spur bargaining.

Union and employer representatives met with Ching's staff in Washington from December 17 to December 20, but as expected there was no resolution.

By this time, the press was openly speculating that Truman would have to invoke the injunction and cooling-off period provisions of the Taft–Hartley Act. Truman himself said on Christmas Eve from his home in Missouri that use of the Taft–Hartley law was under consideration. Outright seizure of the steel mills was considered remote.

President Truman certified the dispute to the Wage Stabilization Board on December 22. Although steelmakers agreed not to shutter production until the Board made its wage determination, Murray kept the nation in suspense until December 28 before agreeing to postpone the strike.

Feinsinger appointed a six-member panel to hear the steel wage case. Two members came from the employers, one from the AFL, one from the CIO, and two from the public. Leading the panel was Harry Shulman, a professor of law at Yale University and a widely respected mediator and labor arbitrator. Hearings were set to being on January 7, 1952, with a report due 30 days later.

Nevertheless, when union leaders met at their announced January 3 meeting in Atlantic City, Murray warned the country that the union intended to keep its no-strike pledge only for 45 days. The union would strike on February 21 if no acceptable wage agreement was forthcoming.

== WSB deliberations ==
Organized labor believed it was being frozen out of wage stabilization decision-making, and that political and economic pressure on Truman would push the president to establish a broad wage freeze. The Wage Stabilization Board assembled the steel wage panel on January 3, and opened hearings on Monday, January 7. Although economic stabilization officials were excluded from the panel's proceedings under E.O. 10233, they nevertheless attempted to influence the panel's deliberations. The day before the panel's hearings opened, Putnam announced ESA would seek a better wage formula than that contained in Wage Regulation 6. Ten days later, Feinsinger announced that a wage regulation rewrite would be undertaken as quickly as possible.

The hearings opened with the Steelworkers arguing for a wage and benefit increase estimated between 30 and 50 cents an hour, while the employers claimed no increase whatsoever was possible without price relief. ODM director Charles E. Wilson made it clear in a public statement on January 15 that the administration's inflation program would be wrecked if the workers succeeded in winning a wage increase larger than 4 cents an hour. Office of Price Stabilization economists were disturbed by the union's request. A secret internal memorandum by OPS staff members indicated that the union was actually due a 22-cents-an-hour wage increase, and that the steel companies could absorb up to 40 cents an hour in additional costs without a price hike. But for the union to win a wage increase without giving the employers price relief would appear inequitable and create political problems for both OPS and WSB with Republicans in Congress.

On January 12, the union and the steelmakers agreed to meet privately, outside the steel wage panel's auspices. Both sides felt agreement could be reached on six non-economic issues: grievance procedures, arbitration mechanisms, improved suspension and discharge procedures, health and safety issues, military leave, and the contract's preamble.

The steel wage panel recessed for three weeks after its opening hearings in order to allow the employers time to make their arguments. In the interim, OPS announced it was granting the steelmakers a price increase of $2 to $3 per ton—even though they had not applied for it. OPS chief DiSalle hoped that the price increase would placate the employers and relieve pressure on the steel wage panel. But the employers began publicly talking about a price increase of $6 to $9 per ton, and the stratagem failed.

Press speculation that the union would win a 14 cent an hour wage increased after Shulman made a similar recommendation in an unrelated aircraft industry workers' collective bargaining case on February 9.

The employers countered with testimony indicating the steel industry was on the verge of bankruptcy. When hearings resumed February 2, Retired Admiral Ben Moreell, president of Jones and Laughlin Steel Company, declared the steel industry to be financially insecure. He estimated the cost of the union's wage and benefit package at $1.08 an hour, not 30 to 50 cents an hour. The estimate was more than double the industry's previous assessment. Benjamin Fairless, meanwhile, testified that the wage demands would reduce steel industry profits so much that the federal government would lose more than $11 billion in tax revenues.

The employers also countered with a massive public relations campaign. The steel manufacturers had decided to wage a public relations campaign early in the wage dispute, possibly as early as August 1951. They coordinated their anti-union effort by forming a group called "Steel Companies in the Wage Case", and relied on the resources of the American Iron and Steel Institute as well. Designed to emphasize the patriotism of the steel companies during wartime, the public relations campaign was implemented in newspapers and on radio and television stations nationwide. The campaign attacked not only the union but also the WSB and the Truman administration generally. The public relations campaign asserted that "runaway inflation" would occur if steelworkers' pay rose even minimally. A pay increase, it was said, would ruin the economy of the Deep South, "hamper the country's defense against atomic attack, undermine our foreign economic policy and introduce totalitarianism". The steel industry also charged that union proposals would create such inefficiency that workers would be driven to "radicalism and communism" in sheer frustration. In United States Senate hearings after the strike ended, the Senate Committee on Labor and Public Welfare denounced the public relations campaign in very strong terms, accusing the steel companies of undermining the work of a government agency:

[The] outpouring of propaganda and scare advertisements before, during and after the Wage Stabilization Board's deliberations was not calculated to create an atmosphere in which the union and management could come to a settlement on their own. ... The processes of collective bargaining are difficult enough without the accompaniment of a hysterical chorus egging one of the parties on to battle.

The steel industry completed making its case on February 14. Final arguments were made against the union shop. The issue had taken on increasing importance to the steel manufacturers over the previous three months. Many of the chief executives of the larger steel companies came to see themselves as the last bulwark against wholesale unionism. Fairless, in particular, felt that if the WSB included a union shop proposal in its recommendations, the ruling would put the government's imprimatur on unionization. The steel industry, it was felt, was the last defender of capitalism and the free market.

The steel wage panel concluded its hearings on February 16, 1952. The issues proved so numerous and complex, however, that the panel advised the Wage Stabilization Board that it needed until March 13 to complete its report. The union was asked to extend its strike deadline. Despite Murray's accusation that the government intended to provoke a strike, the union gave the WSB until March 20 to issue its wage ruling.

As the hearings ended, OPS Director DiSalle resigned on February 15, 1952, in order to run for the U.S. Senate. Truman appointed Ellis Arnall, a former governor of Georgia, as DiSalle's successor.

The wage panel turned its report over to the Wage Stabilization Board on March 13.

== Ruling and steel mill seizure ==
The union shop issue came to increasingly dominate the WSB's deliberations. Initially, Feinsinger refused to consider any issue other than wage increases. Feinsinger even refused to discuss the issue with his superior, Putnam. Feinsinger was under pressure to win support for a recommendation by a majority of the Board and issue a report before the union lost patience and struck. CIO and Steelworkers' counsel Arthur Goldberg persuaded the WSB's labor representatives to withhold their support for a recommendation until Feinsinger not only agreed to consider the union shop but recommend it to the president.

As the WSB's deliberations stretched into March, Murray agreed to delay the strike deadline until April 8—although he kept the public guessing about the union's plans until the day before the planned strike.

On March 20, 1952, the Wage Stabilization Board issued its recommendations. The report called for an 18-month-long contract, with a pay increase of 12.5 cents retroactive to January 1, 1952, followed by a 2.5 cent an hour rise on June 30, 1952, and a 2.5 cent an hour rise on January 1, 1953. Various improvements to fringe benefits were also made. The board also recommended the union shop. In all, the cost of the pay hike ranged from 18 to 30 cents an hour, although 26 cents was the most quoted figure. The vote was 12 to 6, with all industry members of the WSB in the minority. The Board had not, however, included an automatic cost-of-living adjustment and only brought fringe benefits up to parity with other industries. And by front-loading the contract, the Board had practically ensured that inflation would outpace the wage increase, contributing to economic stabilization.

Reaction to the recommendations was overwhelmingly negative. Steel companies claimed they would need a $12 per ton increase in the price of steel in order to stay solvent. Nearly all Republicans in Congress denounced the recommendations, joined by a significant number of Democrats. The mass media portrayed the wage increase as political payback to the union for supporting Truman politically, and editorials accused the WSB of dereliction of duty in order to satisfy the union.

Unfortunately, President Truman's initial reaction to the WSB's recommendations was also negative. Based solely on press reports of the WSB report, Truman—vacationing in Key West, Florida—declared the recommendations to be economically destabilizing.

The union and employers immediately began bargaining over the terms of the wage recommendation and other, local issues. But negotiations proceeded slowly.

Defense mobilization chief Charles Wilson, however, determined to upend the Wage Stabilization Board's recommendations. Wilson was convinced by Truman's remarks at the Key West press conference that the president would reject the Board's report. On March 21, Wilson met with steel industry officials to learn their views. On March 22, he consulted with Putnam and Arnall. On March 23, Wilson flew to Key West to speak with the president. The two men met the next morning. Wilson flew back to Washington that afternoon, convinced he had won Truman's consent to settle the steel wage dispute at a level two-thirds lower than the recommendation of the WSB.

As Wilson departed Key West, he made an off-hand remark that he believed the WSB recommendations would seriously destabilize the economy. Murray was outraged by the statement, and declared that it was Wilson who had wrecked national economic stabilization policy. Although Murray said he remained committed to resuming bargaining on March 26, he refused to meet with Wilson. Murray, working with Goldberg, had initially prepared a much stronger statement, but Feinsinger successfully pleaded with him to moderate his tone and language.

Feinsinger, too, was deeply upset by Wilson's remarks. He had consulted with Wilson and Putnam on the proposed recommendations shortly before the release of the report, and Wilson had expressed no concerns then.

Meanwhile, Truman had changed his views on the recommendations. The White House staff had analyzed the WSB's report and concluded that the wage and benefit package did not violate stabilization guidelines. Truman's political advisors also worried that by repudiating the agency's recommendations, Truman was essentially repudiating his own economic policy.

On March 27, Wilson learned of the president's change of heart. Wilson met with Putnam, Arnall and Feinsinger, but was unable to win their assent to a large steel price increase. To convince them that the president had authorized the price increase, the four went to the White House that afternoon. At the meeting, Putnam and Arnall argued that the wage recommendations had not breached the stabilization guidelines, but Wilson's price increase would. Truman then stated that he had not given Wilson authority to negotiate higher steel prices.

Humiliated and declaring his integrity was called into question by the president, Wilson resigned late on the afternoon of March 27. The resignation was made public three days later. Most press reports interpreted the resignation as a sign that Truman was capitulating to union demands. Truman named John R. Steelman, Assistant to the President of the United States (a post which would later become White House Chief of Staff), acting director.

Steelman urged the employers and the union to begin negotiations again. The steel companies agreed to begin talks on March 30, but put them off until April 3. When talks did begin, the steel companies made the first economic offer to the union since negotiations began the previous November: A total wage and benefit package totaling 14.4 cents an hour, contingent on the companies receiving the maximum price increase allowed under the Capehart Amendment. The union rejected the offer. Arnall secretly offered the steel companies a price increase of $4.50 a ton on April 3, but the steel companies demanded at least $5.50 a ton.

Truman began to consider his options, and a seizure of the nation's steel mills seemed the most likely course. Truman was told that supplies of ammunition in Korea were low, and even a 10-day strike would endanger the war effort. Atomic weapons projects would be curtailed, 1,500 miles of highway would not be built, and U.S. commitments under the Mutual Defense Assistance Act could not be met—which might encourage Soviet aggression. Truman ruled out use of the Taft–Hartley Act, believing it was unfair and unlikely to ensure steel production. Consideration was given to using Section 18 of the Selective Training and Service Act. Section 18 permitted the government to seize and operate manufacturing facilities if the manufacturer was unable to fulfill defense orders made by the government. Justice Department lawyers worried, however, because the act did not specifically mention failures to fulfill orders due to strikes, and because the government did not order steel directly from manufacturers. Section 18's mechanisms were cumbersome and time-consuming, and Defense leaders argued against its use. Most of Truman's advisors favored seizure of the steel mills under the inherent powers of the President as commander-in-chief.

The steel talks collapsed on April 4, and the union notified the steel manufacturers that day that it planned to call a nationwide strike which would begin at 12:01 a.m. on April 9.

At 10:30 p.m. Eastern time on April 8, President Truman announced in a national television and radio address that he had issued Executive Order 10340 and he was ordering Secretary of Commerce Charles W. Sawyer to seize the nation's steel mills to ensure the continued production of steel. Truman attacked the steel companies' price demands, explained why he was not using the other legal options open to him, and called on the employers and union to meet in Washington the following day to negotiate a new collective bargaining agreement. The union immediately called off its strike, even though Sawyer announced he had no intention of giving them a wage increase.

== Legal action ==
Twenty-seven minutes after the conclusion of Truman's speech, attorneys for Republic Steel and the Youngstown Sheet & Tube Company arrived at the door of United States district court Judge Walter Bastian with papers in hand to demand a temporary restraining order to prevent the seizure. Bastian refused to rule without hearing from the government and set argument for April 9 at 11:30 a.m.

The case was assigned to Judge Alexander Holtzoff. Attorneys for the steel companies argued that the President lacked the constitutional authority to seize the steel mills and that the steel companies would suffer irreparable harm if the seizure were not enjoined. Holmes Baldridge, assistant attorney general in the Claims Division of the Justice Department, argued the case for the administration. Unprepared and unfamiliar with the issues, Baldridge argued that no irreparable harm would ensue and that the steel companies had an adequate remedy under the Federal Tort Claims Act. Holtzoff denied the temporary restraining order ten minutes after oral arguments concluded.

The press was almost unanimous in its condemnation of the steel mill seizure. The New York Daily News headline was typical: "Truman Does a Hitler". Only one newspaper with a sizeable circulation supported the President. Congress also reacted negatively. There were calls for Truman's impeachment, and a number of bills were introduced to strip the WSB of its powers, to permit the government to end the strike, and to withdraw congressional approval of the expenditure of funds to operate the steel plants. The steel companies also condemned the action. Clarence B. Randall, president of Inland Steel, gave a nationally broadcast speech on April 9 that attacked Truman and the Steelworkers. The employers' public relations group, Steel Companies in the Wage Case, undertook an ambitious advertising campaign against the administration. Full-page advertisements in major metropolitan newspapers appeared the next day that excoriated the seizure, and within a week, tens of thousands of pamphlets and fact sheets had been produced supporting the steel manufacturers' position.

=== District court ruling ===
The steel companies next sought a permanent restraining order. On April 10, Bethlehem Steel, Jones and Laughlin Steel, Republic Steel and Youngstown Sheet & Tube Co. asked Judge Bastian to hear their case, but Bastian recused himself because he held 30 shares of stock in the Sharon Steel Corporation. The case was assigned to Judge David Pine, who set oral argument for April 24.

As preparations for the district court hearing began, the government tried to secure a wage settlement. Independent talks failed. Sawyer oversaw the next round of negotiations, and his personal intervention did not work. Arnall threatened to give the steel companies no price rise, and Putnam ordered a $3-per-ton price increase. Neither tactic budged the steelmakers. Sawyer threatened to impose a wage increase, but that stratagem failed. Sawyer then formally gave the workers a small pay raise; once more, the talks stalled.

Judge Pine began the hearing on schedule. The steel companies focused on the issue of equitable relief. The employers' attorneys pointed out that they could not make a claim for relief if the courts found the seizure illegal. Additionally, the Federal Tort Claims Act required the government to give its consent to be sued for relief, which the government had not done. Judge Pine pressed the steel company attorneys to address the constitutional issue, which the government had strongly emphasized in its briefs. Most of the company attorneys seemed shocked by Pine's request and were unable to address the issue, but Charles Tuttle, counsel for Armco Steel, squarely argued the issue. In his counterargument the following day, Baldridge claimed that the courts had no authority to enjoin the President and then argued that the court should ignore the constitutional issue if it could decide the case on grounds of equity. Baldridge relied heavily on Ex parte Merryman 17 F. Cas. 144 (1861), Mississippi v. Johnson 71 U.S. 475 (1866), In re Debs 158 U.S. 564 (1895) and United States v. Pewee Coal Co. 341 U.S. 114 (1951) as justification for the government's claims of unfettered executive power.

Baldridge's claims of unlimited executive power created a firestorm of negative opinion on April 26. Newspapers denounced the claim, public opinion ran heavily against the president, and members of Congress took to the floor of their respective chambers to attack the argument. Truman was forced to issue a denial of Baldridge's assertion, but the pressure on the administration continued unabated.

Judge Pine issued his opinion at 4:45 p.m. on April 29 and declared: "There is no express grant of power in the Constitution authorizing the President to direct this seizure. There is no grant of power from which it reasonably can be implied. There is no enactment of Congress authorizing it." The government, Pine wrote, had said in its brief that it "does 'not perceive how Article II (of the Constitution) can be read so as to limit the Presidential power to meet all emergencies,' and... claims that the finding of the emergency is 'not subject to judicial review.' To my mind this spells a form of government alien to our Constitutional government of limited powers. I therefore find that the acts of defendant are illegal and without authority of law."

Pine's decision was read as a ringing defense of limited government and was widely praised by the press and Congress, but a furious Philip Murray ordered union members on strike on April 30, and federal officials made plans to curb commercial construction projects, cut back automobile production, and shutter consumer appliance factories.

=== Appellate court ruling ===
At 10:00 a.m. on April 30, the government asked Judge Pine to stay his injunction, but he declined. Minutes later, the government filed papers for a stay with the Court of Appeals for the District of Columbia Circuit. The Court of Appeals decided to hear the case en banc. Oral argument began at 3:15 p.m. and lasted three hours. The government forcefully argued that the national defense was imperiled by the strike; only a stay of the district court injunction would induce the union to return to work. The steel companies disagreed, and attempted to focus the court's attention on the irreparable harm the companies were suffering.

After deliberating for 40 minutes, the judges delivered their verdict. In a 5–4 ruling, the Court of Appeals stayed the district court's injunction but only until 4:30 p.m. on Friday, May 2. If a request for certiorari were filed with and accepted by the US Supreme Court, the stay would continue until the Supreme Court ruled on the case. If the Supreme Court denied certiorari, the stay would end.

Attorneys for the steel companies were shocked by the ruling. They applied to the court for an amendment to the ruling requiring maintenance of the status quo. The court agreed to hear the application. At 10:27 a.m. on May 1, the Court of Appeals heard 45 minutes of oral argument from each side. The court reconvened at 1:30 p.m. and announced in a 5–4 ruling that it was denying the petition for an amended ruling.

On the evening of May 1, Truman called Murray and asked for the strike to be called off pending a ruling of the Supreme Court. Murray agreed.

=== Supreme Court ruling ===
On May 2 around 10:30 a.m., the federal government attempted to file its appeal to the US Supreme Court. However, the steel companies had already filed (at 9:00 a.m.), which permitted them to open and close oral argument. In accepting the case, the Supreme Court ruled for no material change in the terms and conditions of employment to be made. The ruling was inopportune since President Truman had called steelmakers and the union to the White House that morning to reach an agreement. At roughly 3:00 p.m., after Sawyer, Fairless and Murray had bargained for five hours, a tentative agreement had been reached, but word of the Supreme Court's acceptance of the case led the steel executives to back out of the deal. With Truman unable to force a resolution by threatening to impose a contract, the steelmakers' hands were strengthened. Talks continued sporadically until May 10, but Sawyer ended them when it became clear that the employers were not willing to come to an agreement.

Oral argument occurred on May 12.

Although a quick decision was expected from the court, the ruling was nearly two weeks in coming. Meanwhile, the steelmakers continued to press their public relations advantage against the Truman administration and the WSB: "Hitler and Mussolini did the same thing in Germany and Italy as Truman has done in the United States," declared Thomas E. Millsop, president of Weirton Steel.

The Steelworkers held their annual convention while the court deliberated. Murray strongly condemned the actions of the steel manufacturers and declared that if a wage and benefit increase similar to the WSB's recommendation was not forthcoming, the union would strike. Murray declared that if the president attempted to use the Taft–Hartley Act, the union would not only resist but also strike again as soon as the cooling-off period was over.

On June 2, 1952, in a 6–3 ruling, the Supreme Court declared in Youngstown Sheet & Tube Co. v. Sawyer that the President lacked the authority to seize the steel mills. Writing for a heavily divided majority, Justice Hugo Black held that the President had no authority under the Constitution to seize private property on the grounds of national security. Since Congress had not otherwise authorized the president to seize the steel mills, the President could not do so.

== Strike ==
The Supreme Court's ruling came at noon, and the government returned the mills to their owners that afternoon. The Steelworkers went on strike a few hours later in companies that included Armco Steel, Bethlehem Steel, Great Lakes Steel Corporation, Inland Steel, Jones and Laughlin Steel, Republic Steel, Sharon Steel, U.S. Steel, Wheeling Steel, and Youngstown Sheet and Tube as well as numerous small manufacturers.

The evening of June 2, Truman called a meeting of his top advisors to discuss what to do. Attending the meeting were Attorney-General James P. McGranery, who had been confirmed by the Senate on May 20; Solicitor General Philip Perlman; Secretary of Defense Robert A. Lovett; White House Counsel Charles S. Murphy; Press Secretary Joseph Short; Steelman; and Sawyer. The group discussed invoking Taft–Hartley but felt that the union would resent it and that the law would do little to end the strike.

Truman convened a second meeting the next morning. Several other advisors were also present, in addition to the initial group: former White House Counsels and close Truman confidantes Sam Rosenman and Clark Clifford; Secretary of Labor Maurice J. Tobin; and National Production Authority director Henry H. Fowler. The group considered both the use of Taft–Hartley and asking Congress for legislation to end the strike, but those courses of action were both rejected. Instead, the group decided to sponsor additional talks.

New collective bargaining talks opened in Pittsburgh on June 5 that were productive but foundered on the issue of the union shop.

The economic impact of the strike began to be felt immediately. Layoffs in a number of steel-dependent industries occurred only two days after the strike began. National defense mobilization authorities began denying manufacturers of consumer goods steel four days after the strike started, and they banned the export of steel on June 10. By June 17, defense plants producing the M47 Patton tank, the M41 Walker Bulldog tank, trucks, bazooka rockets, and mortar shells had all shut down or were running half- or quarter-shifts. By June 21, consumer inventories of steel were almost gone, which forced manufacturing shutdowns in the auto industry. As the Independence Day holiday neared, most inventories of steel were gone even from defense stockpiles.

=== Union strategy ===
The union's collective bargaining strategy was two-pronged. The union participated in all collective bargaining talks to seek a national master contract but the union also devised a divide-and-conquer strategy in which it attempted to secure contracts with weaker, often smaller, steelmakers. The first success at the second strategy came at Lukens Steel (later purchased by Bethlehem Steel) on June 11. A tentative agreement was reached with major steel producer Bethlehem Steel on June 23, but the other manufacturers forced the company to retract its agreement and to cancel the deal.

The union also had to forestall invocation of the Taft–Hartley Act. Union leaders felt they had already delayed long enough (five months) and that further delays would only harm union members. Truman was under intense pressure from Congress and his own aides to invoke Taft–Hartley. Murray reiterated the union's opposition to the law and its intention to fight an injunction, statements that tended to inflame emotions and delay a resolution to the strike.

Murray also worried that the impact of the strike on national defense would turn the public against the strike. On June 19, a limited number of union members agreed to return to work to finish and to deliver steel for certain critical defense needs.

=== Changing tactics ===
Congress was active in the strike as well, both house passing nonbinding resolutions urging Truman to use the Taft–Hartley Act to end the strike and introducing or passing various bills to permit the president to end the strike. Ultimately, however, Congress did not act before the strike ended.

The first break in the strike came when Pittsburgh Steel signed an agreement with the union on June 27. The agreement significantly undercut employer solidarity in the strike, and the six largest employers (Bethlehem, Inland, Jones and Laughlin, Republic, U.S. Steel, and Youngstown Sheet and Tube) worried that enough small employers would sign agreements to make the strike uneconomical.

The employers responded by attempting to make the union shop the major strike issue. The six largest employers first bolstered the resistance of the other manufacturers by declaring that the strike would be a long and arduous one. The steel companies then changed the strategy of their public relations campaign, emphasizing the union's proposal for a union shop. Those changes in strategy reinforced the decision of the smaller producers to refuse to sign a contract on the union's terms. On July 3, all holdout employers signed a "no union shop" pledge. Union president Philip Murray was forced onto the employer's ground to defend the union shop, which the organization had sought for more than 15 years.

The next day, the union shifted its strategy as well. Fairless' November 1951 public announcement that the employers would not bargain unless they were guaranteed a price increase was a clear unfair labor practice (ULP), but the union had never filed a ULP with the National Labor Relations Board (NLRB). Truman declared his belief that the steel companies were engaged in "a conspiracy against the public interest." The United Steelworkers finally filed ULP charges with the NLRB, and they threatened as well to file an antitrust suit in federal court against the six biggest steelmakers.

Those legal strategies held significant risks for the employers and led to a new round of negotiations. Secret talks were held in Pittsburgh on July 10. Agreement was reached once more on almost all economic and noneconomic issues except for the union shop. Although the talks ended without an agreement, most observers felt the parties were close to a settlement. Something was needed to push the parties toward an agreement.

White House chief of staff John Steelman demanded on July 14 for the parties to continue to meet, and they did so. The talks collapsed again July 16 later over the union shop.

=== Weaker employers ===
A number of events weakened employers' bargaining position.

Firstly, small steelmakers once more began breaking ranks. The union settled another contract with a small steel manufacturer on July 17. Several other agreements seemed near, leading the larger companies to fear that they were losing the battle for employer sentiment.

Secondly, the Office of Price Stabilization agreed to a new, higher price increase to steel mills for $5.60 a ton. Putnam offered the steelmakers the new price on July 15 but made it conditional on a swift conclusion to the strike. The price increase worsened the position of the six largest employers, as opposed to the smaller manufacturers.

Third, Truman let it be known that he considered nationalizing the steel mills under Section 18 of the Selective Service Act. Truman made the decision to invoke Section 18 in mid-June. To overcome the legal objections to the Act's use that had been raised in early April, the government began placing direct orders for steel on June 12. On July 19, The New York Times reported that Truman was expected to invoke Section 18 within a week. The threat of another government takeover of the steel mills, this time on solid legal ground, with adequate preparation by the government, and with the appearance of even-handedness (steelworkers would be drafted and ordered to work in the mills), brought the manufacturers to the bargaining table again.

Negotiations resumed in Pittsburgh the day after the newspaper report. The talks broke down a day later. Sensing weakness on the management side, the union's executive board voted to reject all previously agreed tentative contract terms. Desperate employers made a dramatic personal appearance before the Steelworkers' executive board and asked the union to drop its demand for the union shop and signoff on the tentative contract terms, but the union refused.

By now, the strike had severely affected the nation. Half-a-million workers were laid off, as companies lacked enough steel to keep plants running. The number of railroad cars loaded in the week ending July 7, 1952 was the lowest since records had been kept, and many railroads began to suffer financial difficulty. California growers faced a loss of $200 million because there was not enough tin to make cans for their crops. On July 22, the US Army shut down its largest shellmaking plant due to a lack of steel.

The shutdown of the Army facility was the last straw for Truman. On the evening of July 23, he ordered the steelmakers and the union to meet in the White House the following day and settle the strike. At 10:00 a.m. on July 24, Murray and Fairless were ushered into the Oval Office. Truman informed the two men of top-secret statistics that showed the US war effort in Korea was being crippled. The President then told Fairless: "You can settle this thing, Ben, and you've got to settle it. I want it settled by tomorrow morning, or I will have some things to say that you won't like to hear, and I will have to do some things you won't like." Fairless started in surprise. Truman then turned to Murray and said, "Phil, you've got to settle this thing too. Now go in there in the Cabinet room, and I want you to come out with a settlement." Both men adjourned to the Cabinet Room. At 4:45 p.m., Fairless and Murray told Truman that they had reached an agreement. Steelman witnessed its signing.

== Outcome ==
The strike was settled on essentially the same terms offered to the employers at the start of the strike. Workers received a 16-cents-an-hour wage increase, and a 6-cents-an-hour increase in fringe benefits. The wage and benefit package was a penny lower than the WSB had recommended but was markedly higher than anything the employers had publicly offered. The workers also won a version of the union shop in which new employees were required to join the union but could resign between the 15th and the 30th day of employment, which few were expected to do.

The strike led to significant economic costs. The loss of economic output was estimated at $4 billion (equivalent to approximately $48,496,240,602 in 2025 dollars), 1.5 million people were pushed into unemployment before full steel production resumed, and the Federal Reserve estimated that industrial output dropped to 1949 levels. More than 19 million tons of steel were lost, roughly 90 percent of all steel production for a two-month period. Nearly four fifths of the nation's small defense contractors were forced to close, and officials observed that several thousand small- and medium-sized businesses would close or run on a part-time basis until steel production resumed (it would take three weeks before furnaces could be cleaned, relit, and brought into production and four weeks for steel to reach manufacturers).

The strike led Congress to strip the Wage Stabilization Board of its labor dispute resolution powers. President Truman struggled to reconstitute the Board in his remaining five months in office. The Board never resumed full operation, and it was abolished by President Eisenhower in March 1953.

Murray and the leaders of the union considered the strike to be a significant win. The union had avoided the imposition of a Taft–Hartley injunction, Truman had gone to significant lengths to protect the union, and the union shop was won for the first time in the steel industry.

== See also ==
- 1946 Steel Strike
- Steel strike of 1959
- Steel strike of 1986
- List of US labor strikes by size
