= Constitutional crisis =

Conflict a governing law is unable to resolve

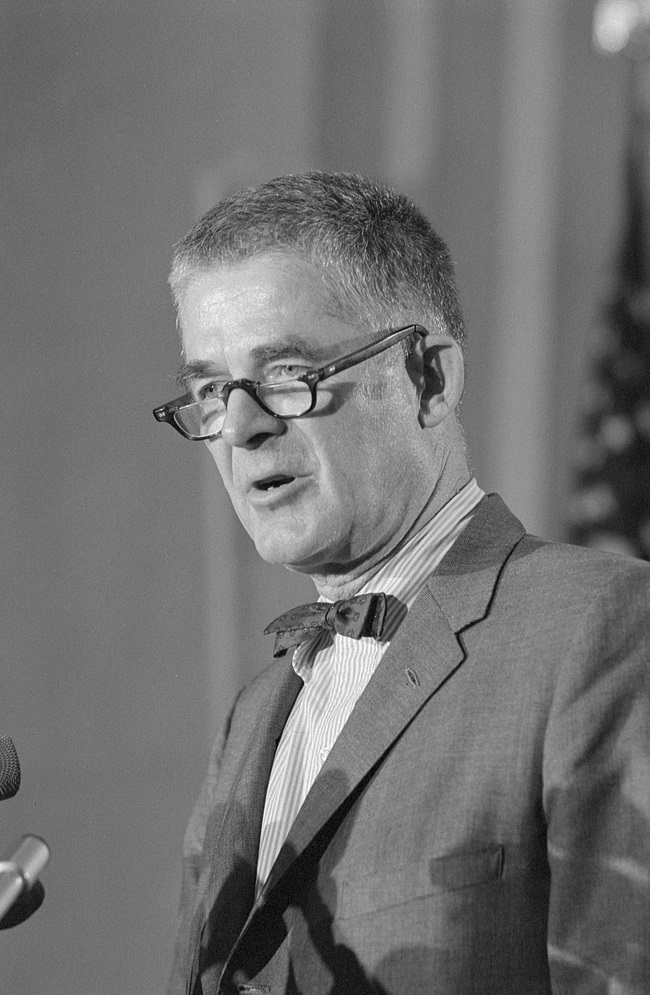
Southern secession in the 1860s (left) and the firing of Archibald Cox during the Watergate scandal (right) are both historical examples of such crises in the United States.

In political science, a constitutional crisis is a problem or conflict in the function of a government that the political constitution or other fundamental governing law is perceived to be unable to resolve. There are several variations to this definition. For instance, one describes it as the crisis that arises out of the failure, or at least a strong risk of failure, of a constitution to perform its central functions. The crisis may arise from a variety of possible causes. For example, a government may want to pass a law contrary to its constitution; the constitution may fail to provide a clear answer for a specific situation; the constitution may be clear, but it may be politically infeasible to follow it; the government institutions themselves may falter or fail to live up to what the law prescribes them to be; or officials in the government may justify avoiding dealing with a serious problem based on narrow interpretations of the law. Specific examples include the South African Coloured vote constitutional crisis in the 1950s, the secession of the southern U.S. states in 1860 and 1861, the dismissal of the Australian federal government in 1975 and the 2007 Ukrainian crisis. While the United Kingdom of Great Britain and Northern Ireland does not have a codified constitution, it is deemed to have an uncodified one, and issues and crises in the UK and its constituent countries are described as constitutional crises.

Constitutional crises can range from minor to requiring a new constitution. A constitutional crisis can lead to administrative paralysis and eventual collapse of the government, the loss of political legitimacy, democratic backsliding or to civil war.

A constitutional crisis is distinct from a rebellion, which occurs when political factions outside a government challenge the government's sovereignty, as in a coup d'état or a revolution led by the military or by civilians.

== Due to conflicts between branches of government ==
Constitutional crises may arise from conflicts between different branches of government, conflicts between central and local governments, or simply conflicts among various factions within society. In the course of government, the crisis results when one or more of the parties to a political dispute willfully chooses to violate a law of the constitution or to flout an unwritten constitutional convention; or to dispute the judicial interpretation of a constitutional law or of the flouted political custom. This was demonstrated by the XYZ Affair, which involved the bribery of French officials by a contingent of American commissioners who were sent to preserve peace between France and the United States. The incident was published in the American press and created a foreign policy crisis, which precipitated the passage of the Alien and Sedition Acts. Opposition to these acts in the form of the Virginia and Kentucky Resolutions cited that they violated freedom of speech and exhorted states to refuse their enforcement since they violated the Constitution.

== Due to constitutional ambiguity ==
When a crisis arises because the constitution is legally ambiguous, the ultimate resolution usually establishes the legal precedent to resolve future crises of constitutional administration. Such was the case in the United States presidential succession of John Tyler, which established that a successor to the presidency assumes the office without any limitation.

== See also ==
- List of constitutional crises
- Cabinet crisis – Mass resignation, or threat thereof, of top-level government advisers
- Common good constitutionalism – Constitutional legal theory by Adrian Vermeule
- Constitutional amendment – Formal change to the text of the constitution of an entity
- Constitutional review – Legal procedure on constitutional matters
- Entrenched clause – Part of a constitution that restricts amendments
- Impeachment – Legislative charges against a public official
- Living Constitution – U.S. Constitutional interpretation
- Rigid constitution – Most supreme law, above other law
- State of exception – State in which the sovereign may ignore the law in the name of the public good
