= Irving Bernstein =

American historian

- Born: November 15, 1916; Rochester, New York, U.S.
- Died: September 25, 2001 (aged 84)
- Education: University of Rochester, Harvard University
- Occupations: Professor, historian

Irving Bernstein (November 15, 1916 – September 25, 2001) was an American professor of political science at the University of California, Los Angeles and a noted labor historian.

== Childhood and education ==
Bernstein was born in 1916 in Rochester, New York. His parents were Latvian immigrants, and his father was a baker.

While in high school, Bernstein became deeply interested in history and the needs of working-class people. "I could see the Depression all around me," he once recalled. "I became enormously interested in the development of the labor movement, and I was tremendously impressed by Franklin Roosevelt and the New Deal."

Bernstein enrolled at the University of Rochester. He worked at a variety of jobs—janitor, lifeguard, dishwasher in a sorority—and received support from his older brother to pay for his education. He earned a bachelor's degree in 1937.

He obtained a master's degree in 1940 from Harvard University.

In 1941, Bernstein became a fellow at the Brookings Institution in Washington, D.C. The same year, he married his wife, Fredrika. They had two daughters and a son.

After the outbreak of World War II, Bernstein took a variety of positions with the federal government. He was an industrial economist at the Bureau of Labor Statistics from 1941 to 1942 and a hearing officer at the National War Labor Board from 1942 to 1943.

When he became aware of Sweden's involvement in assisting Jews to flee Nazi-occupied Europe, he learned Swedish and became a Swedish language specialist for the Research and Analysis Branch of the Office of Strategic Services.

After the war Bernstein returned to Harvard and earned a doctorate in 1948. His dissertation advisor was Arthur M. Schlesinger, Sr. While writing his dissertation, Bernstein was chief of the Materials Section of the U.S. Conciliation Service from 1946 to 1947.

== Career ==
In 1948, Bernstein was appointed a research professor at the UCLA Institute of Industrial Relations.

Bernstein returned briefly to government service during the Korean War. In 1951, he was appointed director of the Case Analysis Division and chairman of the San Francisco Regional Wage Stabilization Board. He left the Board in 1952.

Bernstein became a professor in the department of political science at UCLA in 1960. He retired in 1987.

== Research ==
Bernstein earned critical praise for the first two books of A History of the American Worker, a trilogy about the American labor movement in the interwar period. The Lean Years: A History of the American Worker, 1920-1933 focuses on the decline of the American labor movement following World War I. A decade later, he published The Turbulent Years: A History of the American Worker, 1933-1941, in which he described American unions' growth under the New Deal. In both books, Bernstein argued that the New Deal and labor unions preserved democracy and capitalism at a time when the survival of both was unclear, and that New Deal labor policy dramatically reoriented public policy away from employers toward workers.

The third book in his historical trilogy, A Caring Society: The New Deal, the Worker, and the Great Depression was less well received. The book shied away from legislative enactments and union politics and examined the broader political and social changes which occurred under the New Deal. The book was called "neither fresh nor complete," although critics said it captured well the emotional tenor of the Great Depression and Roosevelt' impact on the American people.

Bernstein's work had a deep impact on labor studies.

"His contributions to UCLA and to labor history were enormous," said Michael Lofchie, chairman of the university's political science department. "He was the great documentarist of the difficulties that labor organizations faced either in getting themselves organized or maintaining their organizational viability during the Depression years."

Arthur Schlesinger, Jr., called him "...pre-eminent among historians of American labor history", and former University of California president Clark Kerr declared him "...the leading historian of labor relations in the United States now active in the field."

== Memberships and awards ==
Bernstein was an officer of the National Academy of Arbitrators, and a member of the Federal Services Impasses Panel from 1979 to 1980. In 1976, he served as president of the Industrial Relations Research Association.

Three times the UCLA Political Science Honor Society proclaimed him "Professor of the Year" for his teaching skills.

== Personal life ==
Bernstein married his wife Fredrika around 1941. They had three children.

Bernstein died on September 25, 2001.

== Published works ==
- Arbitration of Wages. Berkeley, Calif. University of California Press, 1954. ISBN 0-520-00111-7
- Emergency Disputes and National Policy. Irving Bernstein, Harold L. Enarson and R.W. Fleming, eds. New York: Harper and Bros. 1955.
- Hollywood at the Crossroads: An Economic Study of the Motion Picture Industry. Los Angeles: Hollywood A. F. of L. Film Council, 1957.
- The Economics of Television Film Production and Distribution. Sherman Oaks, Calif.: Screen Actors Guild, 1960.
- The Turbulent Years: A History of the American Worker, 1933-1941. Paperback edition. Boston: Houghton-Mifflin Co., 1970. ISBN 0-395-11778-X (Originally published 1969.)
- The Lean Years: A History of the American Worker, 1920-1933. Paperback ed. Baltimore: Penguin Books, 1972. ISBN 0-395-13657-1 (Originally published 1960.)
- The New Deal Collective Bargaining Policy. Paperback reissue. New York: Da Capo Press, 1975. ISBN 0-306-70703-9 (Originally published 1950.)
- A Caring Society: The New Deal, the Worker, and the Great Depression. Boston: Houghton-Mifflin Co., 1985. ISBN 0-395-33116-1
- Promises Kept: John F. Kennedy's New Frontier. New York: Oxford University Press, 1991. ISBN 0-19-504641-2
- Guns or Butter: The Presidency of Lyndon Johnson. New York: Oxford University Press, 1996. ISBN 0-19-506312-0
