= Inherent powers (United States) =

In United States law, inherent powers are the powers that a state officer or entity purports to hold under a general vesting of authority, even though they are neither enumerated nor implied.

== President of the United States ==
The theory of inherent powers of the President derives from the loosely worded statements in the Constitution that "the executive Power shall be vested in a President" and the president should "take care that the laws be faithfully executed" (defined in practice, rather than by constitutional or statutory law). This theory was first articulated in 1793 by Secretary of the Treasury Alexander Hamilton.

President Truman's attempt to seize private steel mills during the Korean War became one of the defining constitutional controversies over presidential emergency powers. Believing that a prolonged steel strike would seriously disrupt defense production and the broader domestic economy, the Truman administration ordered the seizure after efforts to resolve the labor dispute failed. Although the Supreme Court rejected the seizure in Youngstown Sheet & Tube Co. v. Sawyer (1952), the national emergency declared in 1950 remained in effect for more than two decades. During congressional debates over terminating that emergency, the Senate Special Committee on the Termination of the National Emergency relied heavily Justice Robert H. Jackson's concurring opinion in Youngstown, warning that the Founding generation "knew what emergencies were" and how they could become a "ready pretext for usurpation"—emergency powers being "consistent with free government" only when "their control is lodged elsewhere than in the Executive who exercises them."

The extent to which the President possesses exclusive Article II powers was left unresolved by the tripartite framework set out by Justice Jackson in that opinion. Chief Justice William Rehnquist, who had clerked for Justice Jackson during the case, later observed that a formally declared war might present different constitutional considerations.

== Judiciary ==
Courts in the United States are recognized to have inherent powers to ensure the proper disposition of cases before them. At the federal level these include the powers to punish contempt, to investigate and redress suspected frauds on the court, to bar a disruptive person from the courtroom, to transfer a case to a more appropriate venue (forum non conveniens), and to dismiss a case when the plaintiff or prosecutor fails to pursue it.

In re Debs was a Supreme Court decision involving Eugene V. Debs and labor unions. Debs (president of the American Railway Union) was involved in the Pullman Strike earlier in 1894, and challenged the federal injunction ordering the strikers back to work. The injunction had been issued because of the hindrance to transportation of mail. However, Debs refused to end the strike, was cited for contempt of court, and appealed. The main question being debated was whether a federal court had a right to issue the injunction, which dealt with both interstate and intrastate commerce and shipping on rail cars. The court ruled that the government had a right to regulate interstate commerce and ensure the operations of the Post Office, along with a responsibility to "ensure the general welfare of the public."

== See also ==
- Contempt of Congress
