= History of the Industrial Workers of the World =

The Industrial Workers of the World (IWW) is a union of wage workers which was formed in Chicago in 1905. The IWW experienced a number of divisions and splits during its early history.

When the office of the IWW president was abolished at the convention in 1906, deposed President Sherman and his supporters, many from the Socialist Party and the Western Federation of Miners, formed a rump IWW, which ceased to exist after about a year.

After the 1908 convention of the original IWW, at which Socialist Labor Party (SLP) head Daniel DeLeon was barred from voting via credentials challenges, DeLeon and the SLP bolted to form another rump IWW, which came to be called the Detroit IWW. In 1915, the Detroit IWW changed its name to the Workers' International Industrial Union (WIIU). The WIIU continued its close relationship with the SLP, but ceased to exist in 1924.

There was another division within the original Chicago IWW which caused political infighting for many years, and finally split the organization in 1924. This time, the two groups were referred to as the centralizers and the decentralizers. This split was in part responsible for a serious decline in membership — a decline from which the organization has never fully recovered. The decentralizers' faction ceased to exist as a separate group in 1931.

For the existing IWW, the results of the splits were, in part, the abolition of the office of president; the departure of the Socialist Party and the Socialist Labor Party; a constitutional provision barring alliance with any political party; a reliance on direct (economic) action rather than political petition; and a focus on using creative tactics to organize low-wage, itinerant, unskilled, migratory, and immigrant workers.

== Eastern Wobblies, western Wobblies ==
The divisions in the early days of the IWW were based upon differing philosophies and ideologies, and to a considerable extent these differences could be traced to regional particularities.

The Western Wobblies were often casual workers from the mines, mills, lumber camps, and agricultural regions of the West and Midwest. These were largely male, unattached, footloose, and open to adventure. In 1918, just after the United States had entered World War I and the government charged IWW leaders with violation of the espionage law for their anti-war expressions, Robert W. Bruere wrote in Harper's Magazine that,

The Industrial Workers of the World are most numerous among the migratory workers of the West; among the homeless, wayfaring men who follow the harvests from Texas across the Canadian border; among the lumberjacks who pack their quilts from camp to distant camp in the fir and pine and spruce forests of the Northwest; and among the metalliferous miners of Michigan, Minnesota, Montana, Idaho, Colorado, Arizona, and Old Mexico. In other words, they are strongest among the men upon whom the nation depends for three of its basic raw materials—materials of fundamental importance at all times; of crucial importance in time of war.

According to our best information, approximately four-fifths of these migratory workers are men whose family ties have been broken—"womanless, voteless, and jobless men." Competent authorities estimate that about one-half of them are native Americans, and the other half men who have been uprooted by labor brokers and padrones from their native ethnic and social environments; voluntary or forced immigrants from the agricultural districts of Ireland, from the Welsh and Cornish mines, from the hungry hills of Italy, Serbia, Greece, and Turkish Asia Minor.

Bruere wrote of a "pernicious system of sabotage" by railroad corporations and other business interests, creating "hobos, vagabonds, wayfarers—migratory and intermittent workers, outcasts from society and the industrial machine, ripe for the denationalized fellowship of the I. W. W."

Typical IWW tactics in the West were soap boxing and, where they found it necessary, the free speech fight. As a direct result of their working class experiences in western states, Western Wobblies developed a bitter hostility toward political parties. The most conspicuous example of these anarchistic sentiments among Western Wobblies was the Overalls Brigade, who were suspicious of all political parties; believed voting and legislating a ritual aimed at deluding workers; were antagonistic toward craft unions, referring to them as coffin societies; and, were generally opposed to leaders of any kind, even within the IWW.

In the East, the IWW became the champion of ethnic solidarity and the focus of immigrant discontent, during a strike of women mill workers in Lawrence, Massachusetts, and elsewhere. One notable struggle in Paterson, New Jersey involved the production of a pageant in Madison Square Garden, performed by the strikers themselves. Many Eastern IWW members tended to be more supportive of radical state socialist principles of the Socialist Labor Party variety. They did not care for anarchy, and tended to dismiss the Socialist Party's reformist philosophy. According to Paul Brissenden, a labor historian who wrote about the IWW in 1919, the Eastern Wobblies were "revolutionary Marxists — doctrinaire to the bone — saturated with the dialectic."

From 1905 on, many workers in the West were unable to vote. This created a different dynamic from the experiences of early IWW supporters in the East. However, by the time the IWW began to organize textile workers in Lawrence, Massachusetts in 1912, the IWW would confront the same circumstance in the East. In 1913, IWW organizer Bill Haywood would declare, "I advocate the industrial ballot alone when I address the workers in the textile industries of the East where a great majority are foreigners without political representation. But when I speak to American workingmen in the West I advocate both the industrial and the political ballot." But by this time, regional differences had already exerted a significant impact on the organization.

In some sense, the Western Wobblies would evolve into the Chicago IWW after the split of 1908. The Eastern Wobblies, whom Brissenden believed held most closely to the ideals of the first convention, became the Detroit IWW after the same division.

These two factions became the most visible manifestations of a divided IWW. The Chicago, or "Red IWW" was referred to variously as the direct action, the economic, the bummery, or the anarchist faction. The Detroit, or "Yellow IWW" faction was called the doctrinaire, the political, or the socialist faction. However, there were other splits, both before and after this most significant split, in which some of the same philosophical differences played a role.

== 1906 split ==
For the first several years the differences between those who favored political action via electoral politics, and those who believed that working people could never obtain justice through political action, played out within the IWW.

However, other divisions wracked the young organization, initially over the leadership style and practices of President Charles O. Sherman, the first (and only) president of the IWW. Sherman, a failed AFL union leader who sought redemption in the IWW, was accused of expensive habits and financial improprieties, but was also faulted for favoring "pure and simple unionism" of the AFL variety. IWW organizer James P. Cannon observed that members questioned Sherman's commitment to revolutionary principles espoused at the organization's founding:

Charles O. Sherman, the first general president of the IWW, was an exponent of the industrial-union form of organization. But that apparently was as far as he wanted to go, and it wasn’t far enough for those who took the revolutionary pronouncements of the First Convention seriously.

According to Melvyn Dubofsky, Sherman was duplicitous, and used his position as president of the IWW "to increase his power and line his own pockets."

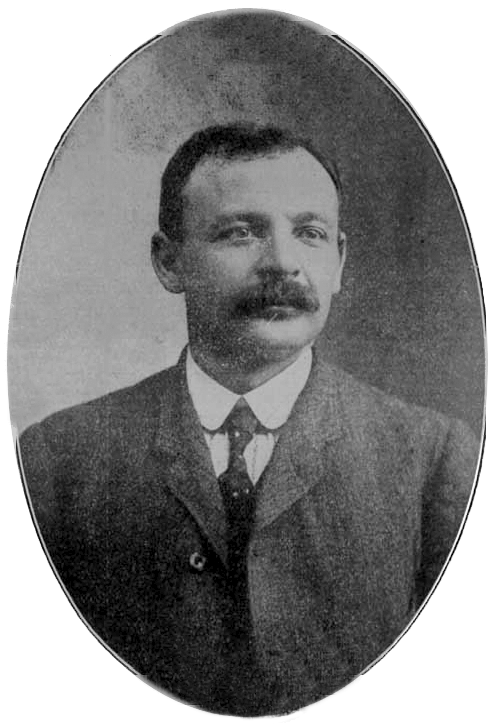
William Trautmann

Sherman was supported by conservative elements in the WFM. He was opposed by IWW Secretary Treasurer William Trautmann, Vincent St. John, and Daniel DeLeon, head of the Socialist Labor Party, who averred that they sought to rescue the organization's stated purpose and philosophy—revolutionary working class solidarity. The more "radical" element within the IWW — composed of those referred to as "beggars, tramps, and proletarian rabble" — specifically, those who favored direct action, some organization leaders, plus DeLeon's group — adopted a member's proposal published in the Industrial Worker which called for abolishing the office of president. The proposal was agreed to at the 1906 convention.

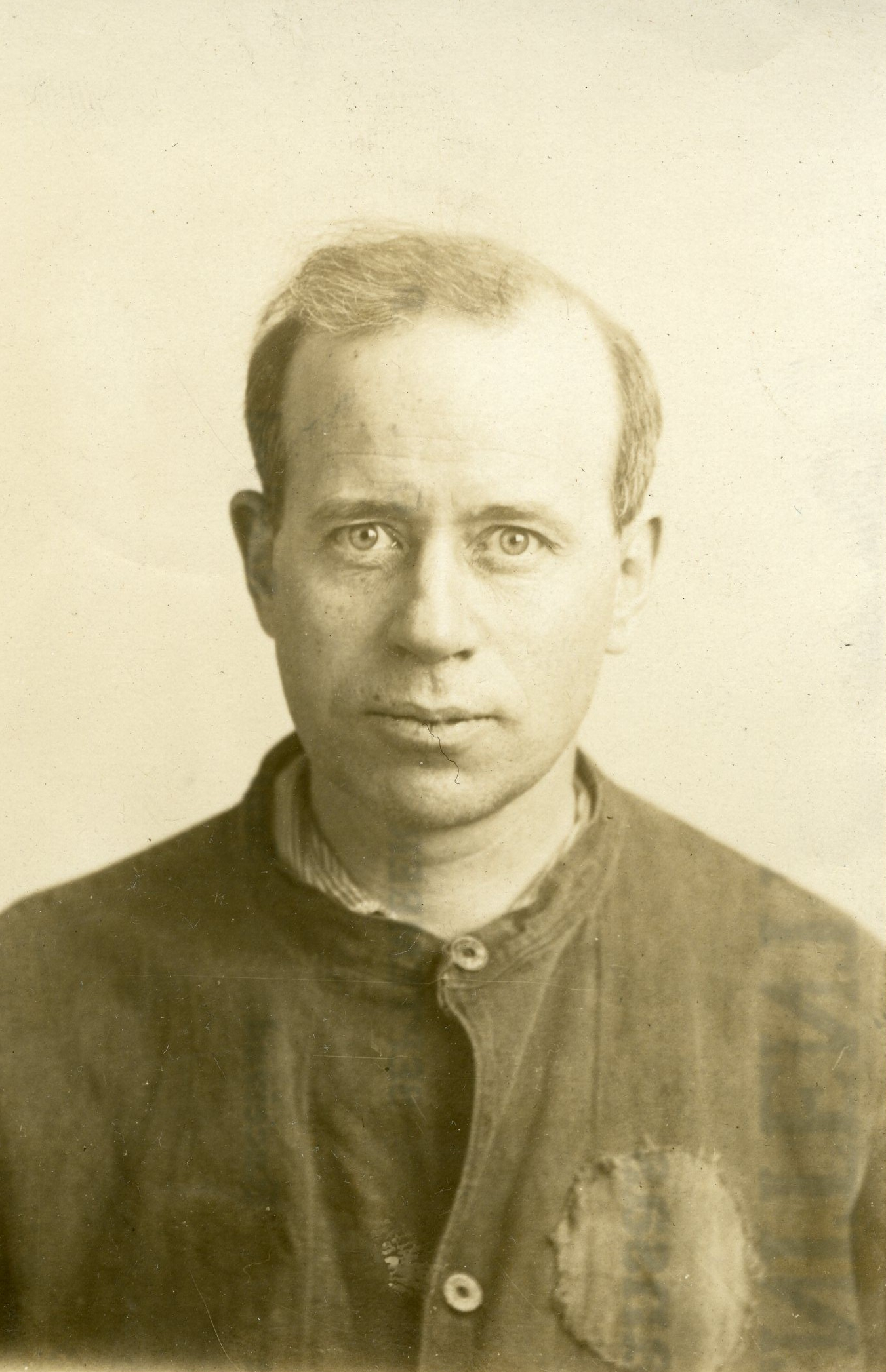
Vincent St. John

Paul Brissenden believed, however, that the issues behind divisions in the first two years were more personality than principle, complicated by intrigue on the part of individuals in the two socialist parties. Brissenden weighed the arguments of the two sides, and concluded that neither side acted charitably toward the other. Furthermore, Bill Haywood, writing from prison in Idaho before his acquittal, emphatically condemned "Shermanism", but then chided that with a bit of diplomacy, the troubles could have been smoothed over. However, with Big Bill's charismatic leadership skills temporarily unavailable, the die had been cast. Haywood would later write (in his autobiography, published in 1929), "Sherman had proved incapable, and if not actually dishonest, he had used an enormous amount of the funds for unnecessary purposes."

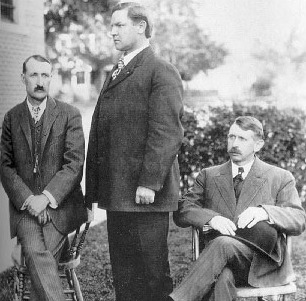
1907 photo of (left to right) Charles Moyer, Bill Haywood, and George Pettibone while imprisoned in Idaho, accused by WFM member and police informant Harry Orchard of conspiracy to commit murder. (Orchard found guilty, all others acquitted and/or released)

After the Sherman faction was outvoted at the 1906 convention, they took their argument to the largest organization within the IWW, the Western Federation of Miners (WFM). There, the questions of propriety and organizational philosophy raged for the next eighteen months, with the WFM ultimately taking a conservative turn under WFM President Charles Moyer. Moyer was incarcerated along with Haywood in Idaho, but was freed without a trial. Haywood's radicalism was affirmed by imprisonment, while Moyer, sharing the same cell, was a changed man. He supported those who were already seeking to withdraw the organization from the IWW and, in spite of the fact that Haywood and St. John were likewise officials in the WFM, Moyer was successful.

Historian Joseph Rayback traces the conservative turn of the WFM to the loss of a strike in Goldfield, Nevada, where many of the Cripple Creek miners had migrated after their defeat in the Colorado Labor Wars. While the Colorado governor had mobilized the national guard, the governor of Nevada called for federal troops, which this time "reduced leadership to despair" and forced the WFM rank and file to finally give up its radical leanings. By 1911, the WFM once again affiliated with the AFL. Thus ended the WFM's decade long flirtation with revolutionary sentiments.

The departure of deposed President Sherman and his supporters from the 1906 convention resulted in the first of several occasions that members found themselves with a choice between two IWWs. While the so-called "beggars, tramps, and proletarian rabble" — the Trautmann-DeLeon-St. John faction — finished the convention with theoretical control of the organization, Sherman benefited from "the manipulations of a socialist lawyer" to gain possession of the office, the records, and the resources to publish the Industrial Worker, which he continued to publish for a year thereafter. Sherman took the smaller share of union locals, but retained some support within the soon-to-depart Western Federation of Miners. Each side claimed to be the real IWW, while simultaneously disparaging the other side.

For approximately a year, the Trautmann-DeLeon-St. John faction fought for control, and eventually prevailed. During this time they published a newspaper called the Industrial Union Bulletin instead of the Industrial Worker, only reviving that instrument in 1909.

Sherman's supporters held a convention of the "Sherman IWW" in the summer of 1907, but there seem to be no records of the event. It appeared to be their last gasp as a rump IWW.

Although the 1907 convention of the Trautmann-DeLeon-St. John IWW was relatively peaceful, the earlier departures of the WFM and the Sherman crowd didn't bring an end to dissension within the organization.

== 1908 split ==
While DeLeon had helped to rescue the radical character of the organization from what was alleged to be a conservative and corruptive element, his own beliefs and practices soon became an issue for those same "beggars and tramps" with whom he'd previously allied. DeLeon's history and personality made him a fairly easy target for dissenters. DeLeon was head of the Socialist Labor Party, which Paul Brissenden described as "always ... emphatically Marxian and its leaders have been so decidedly doctrinaire in their interpretation of Marxian socialism ... that they have been not unjustly called impossibilists." DeLeon's enemies commonly referred to him as the "Pope of the S.L.P."

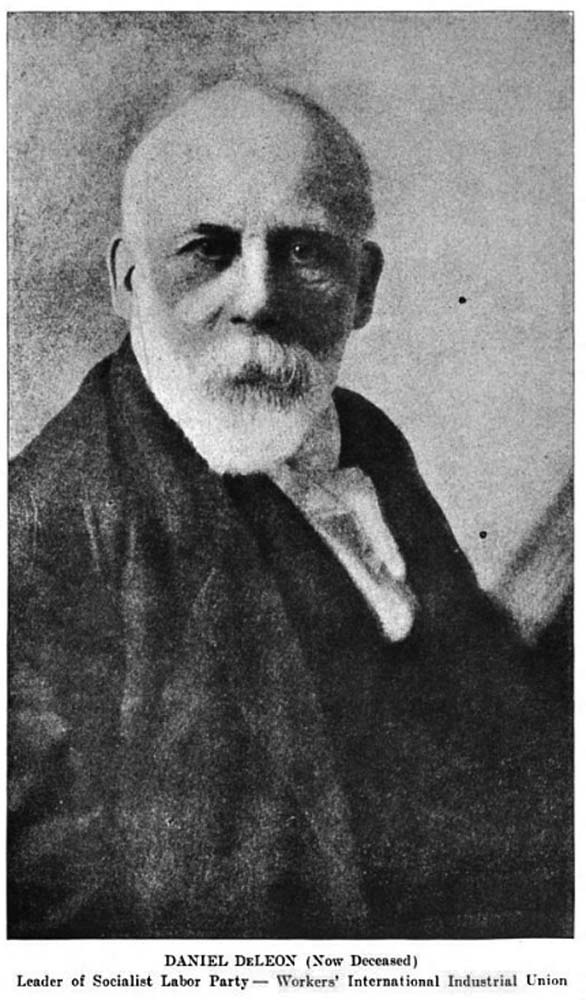
Daniel DeLeon

DeLeon believed that a rise in wages for workers resulted in a rise in price, so that workers obtained no worthwhile gain from seeking higher wages. This argument suggested that one of the most significant immediate goals of unions was not worthwhile. James P. Thompson and James Connolly expressed the opposite viewpoint, grounding their writings in the work of Ricardo and Marx. When DeLeon launched a secret hearing against Connolly for "economic heresy" in 1907, the issue of politics vs. the economic class struggle came to the attention of the entire union, including branches of the organization in Britain and Australia.

DeLeon possessed "a supreme confidence in himself and his views," and was "highly impatient" with those who did not agree. A prolific writer, he hammered away at theory in Socialist Labor Party publications, emphasizing the importance of the IWW's participation in the political fight, and "making it unmistakably clear that this meant helping to build" the Socialist Labor Party.

The stage was set for a showdown.

=== Overalls brigade ===
Out of the West came the overalls brigade, a group of Wobblies who wore blue denim overalls covering jet black shirts, with red bandannas around their necks. They wore IWW buttons, and they were proud of their organization. They were nineteen men and one woman, and they referred to themselves as "red blooded working stiffs." They rode the rails from Portland to the IWW convention in Chicago, stopping in working class communities along the way. They held propaganda meetings at each stop, singing IWW songs and selling literature to finance their trip. Led by capable Wobbly organizer James H. Walsh, they traveled over 2,500 miles in their "Red Special" cattle car, ate in hobo jungles, and preached revolution in prairie towns.

These were itinerant workers from the West — representing farm hands, miners, sailors, dock workers, and "timber beasts" who traveled with the job, and spent much of their time unemployed. They couldn't rely upon the vote, because many of them didn't reside in one location long enough to register. They likewise didn't trust that votes counted by "some Citizens' Alliance disciple or the Mine Owners Association" could ever usher in the revolution.

At the convention, DeLeon criticized the newer IWW members "for their crudities, their rawness, and their inability to perceive the more 'civilized' methods" that he had long recommended to the organization. Historian Rayback comments, "It was an ill-advised attack."

The 1905 Preamble to the IWW Constitution had stated,

Between these two classes a struggle must go on until all the toilers come together on the political, as well as on the industrial field, and take and hold that which they produce by their labor through an economic organization of the working class without affiliation with any political party. [emphasis added]

At the 1908 convention, members of the IWW, led by the overalls brigade, first challenged DeLeon's credentials, declaring that he didn't actually work in the Industrial Union with which he was registered. Then they removed the Preamble language about "struggle [on] the political, as well as on the industrial field," which DeLeon had made a condition of his participation at the founding convention in 1905. The IWW was left with only the industrial struggle delineated in the Preamble. DeLeon and his SLP followers walked out of the convention, never to return.

Cannon wrote that St. John, in his capacity as the leader of the early IWW, "judged socialist 'politics' and political parties by the two examples before his eyes — the Socialist Party bossed by Berger and Hillquit and the Socialist Labor Party of De Leon — and he didn’t like either of them." Labor historian Melvyn Dubofsky weighs in on the rejection of the SLP,

DeLeon was among the first to attack the "new" IWW (on the grounds of becoming an anarchist organization) ... But DeLeon and others misunderstood what the convention had done ... [delegates] recognized ... that political debates between socialist factions wrecked union locals and undermined labor's morale. Hence, the Wobblies decided to keep political debate within the party, where it belonged, and to promote industrial action within the IWW, whereby workers could improve their lives.

To Foner, the new orientation of the IWW was a mixed result because,

[T]he program virtually guaranteed the isolation of the I.W.W. from vast numbers of American workers who knew from experience that political action was a necessary weapon in the class struggle, and that, indeed, the existence of many unions, threatened by injunctions and other court decisions, could only be preserved by labor's effectiveness at the ballot box ... [Yet] there were still fertile fields for organizing ... [and in the following years the IWW would] bring the principles of industrial unionism to the attention of hundreds of thousands of American workers, including even many of the A.F. of L.

=== IWW east, IWW west ===
After the Socialist Labor Party withdrew from the IWW in 1908, it formed an offshoot of the "Chicago IWW" in Detroit which also adopted the name Industrial Workers of the World. (It changed its name to Workers' International Industrial Union in 1915). Robert Hoxie, author of Trade Unionism in the United States, referred to the Detroit IWW as socialistic, and the Chicago IWW as quasi anarchistic. Hoxie, who was writing in the 1913-14 time-frame (his book was a joint effort published in 1921), wrote that socialistic unions (some of which were AFL unions) "look forward to a state of society which, except for common ownership and control of industry and strong centralized government in the hands of the working class, does not differ essentially from our own." Although they were "revolutionary," they would attain their goals by peaceful means, both political and industrial. The quasi anarchistic unionists, on the other hand, envision an industrial society in which the unions would act as the government.

Hoxie believed that quasi anarchistic unions were abhorrent of political action. Other authors have a different interpretation. Quoting passages from Bread and Roses Too, Verity Burgmann has written,

the Chicago IWW was 'non-political' rather than 'anti-political'. J.R. Conlin insists too much has been made of the deletion of the political clause in 1908; equally significant was the rejection without discussion by the 1911 Chicago IWW Convention of an amendment to the Preamble that referred to 'the futility of political action'.

Writing decades earlier, Brissenden had already taken up this question:

The constitution of the I. W. W. is not anti-political. It is merely non-political. Any wage-earner is admitted regardless of creed, race, or political opinion. But it is also true that in actual practice, as Levine remarks, "the Industrial Workers have played and are playing the game of antipolitics." "Their spokesmen," he says, "ridicule the 'politicians'; severely criticize the Socialist party and insult its most prominent leaders. The non-political portion of the I. W. W. is therefore practically anti-political."

Brissenden then elaborates on the animosity between the two IWW organizations. However, he follows with the observation,

The break was not, however, entirely caused by disagreement over political and economic principles. It was partly a matter of personal temperament—and primarily the personal temperament of Daniel DeLeon...

Brissenden notes that the organizations which were run by Daniel DeLeon reflected DeLeon's character. He quotes Socialist Labor Party journalist Louis C. Fraina's evaluation of the SLP to assess that character:

The S. L. P. ignored the psychology of struggling workers [he says]. Its propaganda was couched in abstract formulas; just as its sectarian spirit developed a sort of subconscious idea that revolutionary activity consisted in enunciating formulas. This sectarian spirit produced dogmas, intemperate assertions, and a general tendency toward caricature ideas and caricature action; and discouraged men of ability from joining the S. L. P.

Because IWW President Sherman and some of his followers, who left as a result of the 1906 split, had been associated with the Socialist Party, a member of the Chicago IWW expressed the impression that they had purged the Socialist Party during the 1906 split, and then the Socialist Labor Party during the 1908 split. Thus, the non-political, direct action focus of the surviving organization evolved over a period of time.

=== The Detroit IWW ===
The Detroit IWW (which became the WIIU) created an industrial union structure that was similar to that of the IWW. The split between the Chicago IWW and the Detroit IWW was replicated in Canada, Australia, New Zealand and Britain.

In 1909, the Detroit IWW reported 23 local organizations. In the United States, the areas represented were mostly in the East, including Philadelphia, Boston, Bridgeport, Brooklyn, and Paterson.

Unlike the IWW, which from 1908 onwards constitutionally restricted itself from political alliances, the WIIU advocated political associations, and maintained its close association with the SLP, although (as of 1922) it declined to openly affirm this association. Like the IWW, the WIIU advocated use of the general strike.

The WIIU was criticized for focusing more on party propaganda than on organizing workers. From 1908 to 1922, the relationship between the IWW and the WIIU was characterized as "bitter". When the WIIU reported its routine labor statistics to The American Labor Year Book for 1916 (shortly after changing its name), it included — along with its declaration of principles and its membership stats — an editorial comment on the perceived practices of the "Chicago IWW",

The Workers' International Industrial Union is the new name adopted in 1915 to designate the socialist industrial class union, which was organized in 1905 under the name of the Industrial Workers of the World. The change of name was deemed advantageous to distinguish the Socialist organization from the one which follows the tenets of anarchy, advocates "sabotage," and so-called "direct action," usually denoting non-political action. The career of the so-called Industrial Workers of the World was started at the fourth convention of the I. W. W. in 1908 with the slogan: "Strike at the ballot box with an ax."

The WIIU shared much of its membership with the SLP, and struggled after DeLeon's death in 1914. According to labor historian Philip Foner, the WIIU never did conduct a strike of any importance. It disbanded in 1924.

The Detroit IWW, which became the Workers' International Industrial Union in 1916, published the Industrial Union News.

=== The Chicago IWW ===
The Chicago IWW is the organization that survives as the modern Industrial Workers of the World. After the 1908 split, the Chicago IWW began to refer to itself as the Red IWW, and the Detroit group as the Yellow IWW. Daniel DeLeon's followers referred to the Chicago IWW, who ultimately retained the mantle, if not the founding philosophy of the IWW, as "the bummery".

In 1909, the Chicago IWW reported 100 local organizations. From 1908 onwards, the more energetic Chicago IWW could take credit for far the greatest share of organizing and propagandizing.

Hoxie observed that quasi anarchistic unionists like those in the Chicago IWW have a different goal than the socialistic unionists such as the Detroit IWW:

They look forward to the complete abolition of the state and of existing governmental machinery. They visualize, not a political, but an industrial society, where the unions would be the government. All political action is abhorrent to them, partly because the state is outside their scheme of things and political action is a recognition of a compromise with it, but largely because they believe that experience has proved it to be not only useless as a working-class weapon but positively harmful to working class interests.

Hoxie continues,

[The Chicago IWW unionists] have noted that political associations and political gains make the workers soft, conservative, and nonrevolutionary. Revolution degenerates into mere reform, and political preferment makes traitors of working-class leaders . . . Direct action, therefore, has become their slogan, that is, the making and enforcing of demands upon the enemy directly by the workers, through demonstrations, strikes, sabotage and violence. At this point, however, the quasi anarchistic revolutionary unionists themselves split into two camps, centralizers and decentralizers.

The IWW newspaper that focused most specifically on the Western United States (and which continues to be published today) is the Industrial Worker (which, for a time after the 1906 split, was duplicated and/or replaced by the Industrial Union Bulletin). In the East, the IWW newspaper of record for the Chicago IWW was Solidarity.

==== Seeds of another split ====
Foner identified a schism within the Chicago IWW in addition to the east/west divide, consisting of those who wanted a labor union with a revolutionary program, and those who merely wanted to be a revolutionary cadre leading the working class to revolution via propaganda and agitation. Many other analysts, however, identified two contesting groups essentially according to what they called themselves — centralizers and decentralizers.

==== Centralizers ====
Of the centralizers, Hoxie observes,

The centralizers believe that the actual building up of the industrial organization will train and educate the workers in the conduct, not only of industry, but of all social affairs, so that when the organization has become universalized it can perform all the necessary functions of social control now exercised by the state in its legislative, executive and judicial capacities. This universal organization of the workers will then displace the state, government and politics in the present sense; private ownership, privilege and exploitation will be forever abolished. The one big union will have become the state, the government, the supreme organic and functional expression of society; its rules and decisions will be the law.

==== Decentralizers ====
Hoxie explains the decentralizers,

The decentralizers look forward to what they call a free industrial society. Each local group of workers is to be a law to itself. They are to organize as they please. The present industrial and social arrangements are to be overthrown simply by making it unprofitable for the employing class to own and operate industries. Future society is to consist of independent groups of workers freely exchanging their products. The proper proportions of investments and production, the ratio of exchange of goods, etc., will automatically be determined, just as they are under competitive industry, only then the competition will be between groups of workers, instead of between individuals. Universal knowledge and a superior morality, which will spring up as soon as capitalist society is abolished, will take the place of our present complicated system of social control and do away with the necessity of government in the present sense.

Beyond the described differences, Hoxie concludes, the theories, methods, and policies of the centralizers and the decentralizers were much the same. But historian Philip S. Foner described the decentralizers as "the most vehement and noisiest of the anti-leadership element." They wanted to remove all officers of the union, and replace them with a stenographer. They also sought to abolish the union's General Executive Board and the annual convention. In 1913 a majority of delegates rejected the goals of the decentralizers, yet they continued their efforts for years afterward.

== 1924 split ==
In 1924 (three years after Hoxie's analyses were published), as the Detroit IWW languished, the Chicago IWW was once again split by a division between centralizers and decentralizers.

=== Impact of the divisions ===
In 1919 Paul Brissenden wrote that while the departure of Sherman and the Western Federation of Miners in 1906, and the DeLeon faction in 1908, meant the loss of its "most reputable, best financed, and most respectable elements, their loss tended to give sharp definition and emphatic impulse toward a more revolutionary policy." As a result, the IWW became the champion of unskilled and migratory workers, including workers facing frequent unemployment, during the decade that followed. Brissenden commented in 1919 that,

[The Wobblies] were able to develop great strength because they had modified their theories to the extent necessary to make some appreciable application of them to the actual conditions of economic life. They were confronted by conditions and met them at the cost of doctrinal consistency. They were unconscious pragmatists and the result is that they have made themselves felt to a much greater extent than the doctrinaires [of the Detroit IWW]. They have been strikingly successful as gadflies—stinging and shocking the bourgeoisie into the initiation of reforms.

Yet Brissenden wrote that the question of decentralization was "perhaps the most fundamental [issue] ever given wide discussion by the I.W.W. membership." Brissenden, acknowledging in 1919 that the decentralization forces within the IWW had not dissipated, had a sense of foreboding about the future of that organization. He wrote, "the doctrine was not annihilated in 1913; it was merely smothered. The I.W.W. may yet be 'unscrambled'."

In spite of "anti-radical hysteria" during and just after the war years, the IWW continued to grow. The IWW's peak membership probably occurred in 1923. 1924 would see the beginning of a dramatic decline, and the recent repression would work to exacerbate the internal tensions responsible for that decline.

There were a number of reasons that the IWW faced division in 1924. Wobbly leaders who had been arrested and imprisoned during or after World War I on espionage charges (for opposing the war) had just been released in two groups; some, in mid-1923, agreed to a pardon that stipulated they must refrain from activities related to their former union activism. Their decision was viewed with suspicion by the IWW, and by those who refused the pardon. Those who chose to stay in prison were released in December 1923, but their circumstances were likewise divisive.

The IWW reacted to the repression commencing in 1917, in part, by making all former leaders of the IWW ineligible for office. Ralph Darlington observed that this "effectively severed the organization from its past, decapitating the IWW even more ruthlessly than the government had been able to."

Some former leaders, including John Reed, James P. Cannon, and William Z. Foster, had joined the Communist Party, and disagreement over bolshevism created additional dissension. One IWW leader, George Williams, had been in Moscow in 1921, and formed a bad opinion of the political situation in the Soviet Union. He warned against possible Communist influence in the IWW, stating that it would endanger both the principles of the IWW, and the organization itself. Acting upon Williams' recommendation, the IWW chose to oppose Bolshevism. But Bolshevism was only a complicating factor. The centralist-decentralist split would play the decisive role in the future of the IWW.

== Two IWWs, side by side ==
The modern IWW website describes a historical offshoot led by James Rowan of the Lumber Workers Industrial Union (LWIU), who invoked the E-P (Emergency Program). The other faction was sometimes called the "Four Trey" group, taking their name from the address of the IWW headquarters at 3333 W. Belmont in Chicago. Once again, the question of politics played a significant role between union factions. At the 1924 IWW convention, decentralist Rowan scheduled a session in parallel with the official session controlled by the leadership. The result was two competing factions who, as in 1906, fought in the streets and in the courts for control of IWW headquarters. In his book about the IWW, We Shall Be All, Melvyn Dubofsky concluded that the IWW had torn itself apart through internal conflict, and that the result was "total collapse". Rowan formed an "emergency program" (the "E-P") from his base in Washington state, in an effort to save the IWW. "The E-Pers believed that the administration of the IWW was too strongly emphasizing 'Political Action' as opposed to Organizing on the Job. The E-P claimed to oppose 'centralism' in favor of 'decentralism', but the E-P sought to centralize power within individual Industrial Unions."

=== Decline of the IWW after 1924 ===
Archie Green attributed the decline of the IWW to the 1924 split, which was exacerbated by government persecution, and the defection of many members to the Communist Party. At the 1925 convention, there were only eleven delegates. There were no conventions in 1926 and 1927. During this period, in some parts of the country, there were two IWW halls, some of them very near to each other, each following one faction or the other. By 1930, Rowan's separatist movement was bankrupt and had about two hundred followers. By 1931 the E-P, which had been the smaller of the two factions, ceased to exist. Presumably, many in the E-P group began to drift back into the main IWW faction. However, a significant number of members "dropped out the middle" during the period of infighting.

In the 2009 book Labor, industry, and regulation during the progressive era, Daniel Earl Saros concluded that however one characterizes its successes and failures, the IWW "demonstrates that strong challenges were being made to the ideology of social responsibility and that the defenders of that ideology had much to gain from the suppression of radical alternatives."

== See also ==
- Industrial Workers of the World philosophy and tactics
- Labor federation competition in the United States
- One Big Union (concept)
