= 1913 Studebaker strike =

Labor strike in Detroit, US

- Date: June 17–23, 1913 (6 days)
- Location: Detroit, Michigan, United States
- Caused by: Change in Studebaker's pay schedule from weekly to biweekly
- Goals: Return to previous pay schedule; Institution of the eight-hour day; Improved working conditions
- Methods: Picketing; Strike action; Walkout
- Result: Strike ends in failure for the strikers, company later makes change to their pay schedule to placate workers

Parties
Industrial Workers of the World	Studebaker

The 1913 Studebaker strike was a labor strike involving workers for the American car manufacturer Studebaker in Detroit. The six-day June 1913 strike, organized by the Industrial Workers of the World (IWW), is considered the first major labor strike in the automotive industry.

Early in the year, the IWW, a radical anti-capitalist labor union, began to actively organize Detroit autoworkers, who had become a center of the automotive industry. IWW organizers, including Matilda Robbins and James H. Walsh, initially attempted to organize at the Ford Motor Company, but following fierce opposition, they shifted their focus to Studebaker. The company had recently shifted its pay schedule from weekly to once every two weeks, which was very unpopular with the workers. Tensions escalated even more when a vocal critic of the two-week pay schedule was fired, and about 3,500 workers went on strike on June 17. In the following days, this number grew to about 6,000 Studebaker employees, and their demands included a weekly pay schedule, improved working conditions, and an eight-hour day. By June 19, workers attempted to spread the strike to other car manufacturers, which led to a violent confrontation with police outside of the Packard manufacturing plant and a subsequent city ban on large marches and parades. While the strikers continued to make their demands public and attempted to generate support, Studebaker began hiring strikebreakers. Facing this, the strikers voted to end the strike on June 23.

During the strike, Studebaker instituted a policy where employees could receive up to 70 percent of their pay halfway through the two-week period, which placated many of the employees. The IWW maintained a presence in the city and planned to target Ford the following year. This, among other reasons, contributed to Ford announcing a $5 daily pay for its workers at a time when the industry average pay was about half of that. The strike was one of several that ended in failure for the IWW in 1913, and the union continued to face both internal and external issues through the following years. In Detroit, organized labor would not gain a stable and sizeable foothold until the 1930s.

== Background ==
The Industrial Workers of the World (IWW) was founded in 1905 as an anti-capitalist labor union. Compared to the American Federation of Labor, the IWW was more radical and militant in its actions, and during the early 1900s was involved in several large labor strikes, such as the 1912 Lawrence textile strike and the 1913 Paterson silk strike. In 1909 and 1910, the IWW had led organizing campaigns in the city of Detroit, but the results of these drives were short-lived. Around this same time, the city was developing a reputation as a major center in the automotive industry; in 1911, in response to several requests, IWW organizer William E. Trautmann began a concerted effort to organize autoworkers in the city, forming the Auto Workers' Industrial Union Local 16, a local union of the IWW. Through 1912, the local faced problems with attracting members. Discussing Detroit around this time, one historian would later say the city was one of "the most aggressively anti-union open-shop metropolis in the country", while another stated it was "the least unionized city in the country". The Employers' Association of Detroit (EAD), which had been formed by manufacturers and employers in the early 1900s to oppose craft unionism, played an important role in preventing a strong union presence in the city, as they published a blacklist of labor organizers and workers sympathetic to organized labor and provided strikebreakers to companies facing industrial action. Additionally, the Detroit Police Department was generally hostile towards organized labor.

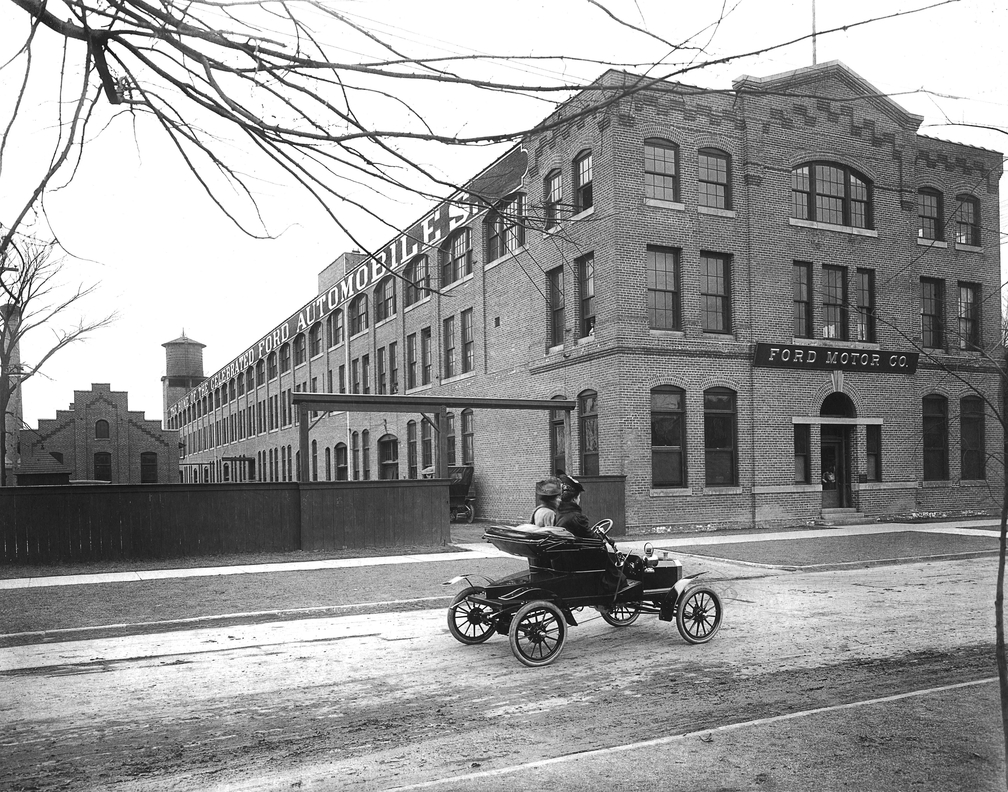
Studebaker had been operating their plant on Piquette Avenue (pictured c. 1906) since 1911.

Starting in 1913, the IWW began to focus its efforts on the automotive industry in the American Midwest. That year, they organized a large strike targeting rubber manufacturers in Akron, Ohio. The strike, despite involving several thousand workers, ended in failure for the IWW, and starting around March 1913, Organizers began focusing their efforts on car manufacturers in Detroit. To effectively organize in the city, the IWW sent in several labor organizers, including Matilda Robbins and James H. Walsh, who initially pushed for an eight-hour day at the Ford Motor Company. (Note: At the time, Ford was using a ten-hour workday.) Ford's Highland Park Plant was targeted primarily due to complaints from workers following company changes to increase productivity. Within a month, the IWW was claiming 200 automotive worker members in the city, and Robbins was regularly attracting roughly 3,000 Ford workers to hear her give speeches during their lunch breaks. However, Ford effectively blocked the organizers' efforts by changing the employee's lunch policies and having Robbins arrested. Additionally, they promoted several known IWW members to foremen, which made them ineligible to be members of the union per IWW policies.

The IWW shifted its efforts from Ford to Studebaker, another car manufacturer in the city, where several IWW members were employed. At the time, a recent change in the company's pay schedule from once a week to once every two weeks had not been well received by many of the employees, with some organizing groups to push for a return to the old pay schedule. Additional complaints concerned the low pay, long hours, and a policy change where, if a payday fell on a Sunday or a holiday, workers would be paid the following day and not the previous day. Organizing efforts at the company centered primarily on the company's #3 plant, located at the intersection of Clark Street and West Jefferson Avenue. In mid-June, Dale Schlosser, a vocal advocate for the return to the weekly pay schedule, was fired from his position as Studebaker. (Note: Sources agree that Schlosser was an advocate for the weekly pay schedule but differ on when and why Schlosser was fired. Several sources state that Schlosser was fired on June 17 due to an unexcused absence. Historian Philip S. Foner states that Schlosser was fired for circulating a petition calling for weekly pay. Additionally, while he does not give an exact date for his firing, he states that the workers held a meeting on June 14 to discuss how they would respond to the firing.) Many workers at the plant protested Schlosser's firing and called on management to reinstate him but their request was rejected. On June 17, approximately 3,500 workers at the plant performed a walkout. This marked the first major labor dispute in the history of the automotive industry. (Note: Multiple sources state that this strike was the first major labor strike in automotive history. However, the industry had seen some smaller strikes before, with historian Philip S. Foner citing a 1906 strike at the Pope Manufacturing Company's car plant in Toledo, Ohio as probably the industry's first.)

== Course of the strike ==
Following the walkout, protesting commenced outside the factory, and the strikers were joined by some workers from the nearby Timken Axle manufacturing plant. Many of the workers gathered in a nearby vacant lot where they listened to a speech given by IWW members. Around noon, about 600 workers, led by a worker waving an American flag, began to march across the city to Studebaker's #1 plant (located in the former Ford Piquette Avenue Plant) at Piquette Avenue and Beaubien Street, roughly 7 miles (11 km) away. By the time they reached the other factory, the police were already there and blocked the strikers from the building. Despite the police presence, the strikers managed to recruit several hundred workers from the #1 plant and continued their march to Studebaker's #5 plant, located near Franklin Street and St. Aubin Street. (Note: Sources differ on how many workers joined the strike, with Foner stating that 2,000 workers from Plant #1 joined the strike, while Babson et al. states that the workers continued their march after 200 to 300 workers from Plant #1 joined them. Additionally, Foner and Babson et al. disagree on the impact of the strike at Plant #5, with Foner stating that about 2,000 workers (nearly all of the plant's workforce) joined the strike and Babson et al. stating that efforts to attract strikers were less successful than at the other plants, and while some workers joined, the plant continued operations.) While some skilled workers, such as metal polishers and iron molders, expressed sympathy for the strike, tool makers organized under the American Federation of Labor (AFL), a craft union-oriented labor federation that was generally at odds with the IWW, refused to strike. While the main cause of the strike concerned the pay schedule, achieving the eight-hour day soon became another goal. By the end of the day, the strikers held a rally and elected strike leaders. Reflecting the immigrant composition of the workers, speeches at the rally were given in English, German, Polish, Russian, Slavic, and Yiddish.

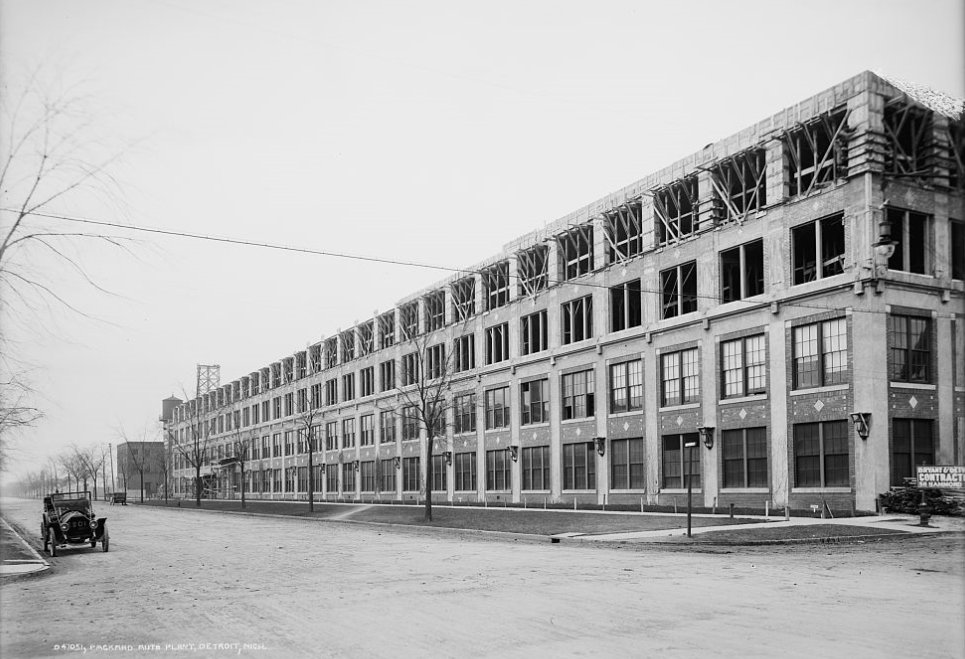
The Packard plant on East Grand Boulevard, c. 1905

Following the initial walkout, the strikers continued to rally and recruit more members from the Studebaker plants, with several sources stating that about 6,000 workers were involved in the strike. The police maintained a presence at these rallies and at speeches given during the workers' lunch hours, the police ordered some speakers to cease when their speeches became more extreme. In addition to Studebaker employees, there were plans to spread the strike to other companies, such as Cadillac and Packard. On June 19, (Note: Foner listed several strike events as occurring in July. In the same source, he states that the strike ended on June 23. Additionally, some sources list events described by Foner as occurring in July as occurring in June.) strikers met at Plant #1 and proceeded to march to the Packard plant in an attempt to recruit their workers. The march to the Packard plant on East Grand Boulevard involved about 2,000 strikers and was initially peaceful. The strikers marched around the plant once before police officers, including mounted police, skirmished with the strikers, clubbing many and arresting some of the strikers and IWW members. Walsh, who had been severely beaten, later led a group to protest the arrests and talked to the chief of police, who agreed to allow the strikers to continue picketing but barred them from holding large marches or parades.

On June 20, strikers held a meeting, presided over by Robbins, where they came up with a list of demands for Studebaker. Among these were a weekly pay schedule, an eight-hour day with the same pay as for a ten-hour day, improved working conditions, and no retribution to strikers following the end of the strike. These demands were printed on leaflets and distributed throughout the city to generate support for the strike. By this time, the strikers were facing a difficult situation. Several days after the strike had begun, Studebaker announced a policy whereby employees could receive 70 percent of their pay halfway through the two-week pay period. This slight concession placated several workers who had initially opposed the change in pay schedule. Additionally, May through September was traditionally considered the off-season for automotive manufacturing; as a result, many unemployed people were ready to take the strikers' jobs. Around this time, the EAD had also begun providing Studebaker with strikebreakers. Due to this, on June 23, the strikers voted to end the strike.

== Aftermath ==
Despite the strike, which caused a short-term disruption to Studebaker's production level, the company managed to produce at near-maximum production capacity for the year and sold over 35,000 cars. The failure of the strike severely impacted the IWW's efforts in Detroit, causing their local membership to decrease drastically; however, the union still maintained a presence in the city, where they operated educational and work relief programs. (Note: While multiple sources state that the IWW maintained a presence in Detroit after the strike, one source mentions the IWW had "left Detroit" following the strike.) Additionally, the union planned to continue organizing efforts at Ford, with labor historian Philip S. Foner stating that it was widely acknowledged at the time that the IWW was planning to conduct strike action against Ford sometime in early 1914. This fear of activity from the IWW, among other reasons, contributed to Ford announcing a $5 daily wage for workers at their Highland Park Plant in January 1914. Before this, Ford workers' average daily pay was $2.34. Despite this, IWW members were active in Detroit as late as 1933, when they became involved in some of the first strikes of the Great Depression. In 1932, they counted about 80 members in Detroit.

Discussing the difficulties with the strike, Robbins stated, "There were some 50,000 or 60,000 auto workers in Detroit at the time. The IWW local did not have the ability, nor even the comprehension, of the magnitude of the job. And the speakers were not organizers with plans and discipline to help tackle the job. The strike dissipated itself. Many years would elapse before the auto workers would move as a mass toward industrial unionism." Historian Robert Justin Goldstein also notes that the police's attack on the strike and its ban on parades contributed to the strike's failure. The Studebaker strike, like several other strikes led by the IWW in 1913, ended in failure for the union and generated concerns over both the IWW's strategy and future. In particular, members noted that, while the strikes were often largescale and significantly impactful in the short-term, they failed to generate long-term success, with the editor of Solidarity (the IWW'S official newspaper) suggesting that the union focus on smaller-scale industrial action. Additional criticism noted the poor organization of the strikes, with one writer for Solidarity opining that, "A spontaneous strike is a spontaneous tragedy unless there is a strong local organization on the spot or unless a strong force of outside experienced men are thrown into town immediately." The IWW would continue to face both internal and external turmoil in the years following the strike, and IWW members would later be targeted by the U.S. Federal Government during the First Red Scare in the 1910s.

Following the strike, organized labor in Detroit remained fairly militant compared to elsewhere, with later largescale labor disputes events including the Ford Hunger March (1932), the Flint sit-down strike (1936), and the Battle of the Overpass (1937). In the years shortly after the strike, the Carriage, Wagon and Automobile Workers Union (CWAWU, which had been formed in 1891 as an affiliate of the American Federation of Labor and had participated to some extent in the Studebaker strike) began to more actively organize workers in the city, but their membership declined rapidly by the 1920s. It would not be until the 1930s that labor unions gained a strong foothold with the city's autoworkers. Speaking of organized labor in the city prior to the 1930s, an article published in the Michigan Historical Review states, "autoworker unions gained few members when industrial jobs were plentiful, wages were good, and the industry's employers controlled the labor market." According to a 1986 book on the labor history of Detroit, the strike, while not successful, showed that "it was possible to unite skilled and unskilled autoworkers of diverse nationalities around militant trade unionism". Foner states that IWW organizer Frank Bohn may have referenced the strike's impact during a speech with the strikers where he said, "the strike was not for a few days or weeks, but maybe twenty or thirty years".

== Sources ==
- Babson, Steve; Alpern, Ron; Elsila, Dave; Revitte, John (1986). Working Detroit: The Making of a Union Town. Detroit: Wayne State University Press. ISBN 978-0-8143-1819-5.
- Barnard, John (2004). American Vanguard: The United Auto Workers During the Reuther Years, 1935-1970. Detroit: Wayne State University Press. ISBN 978-0-8143-3297-9.
- Bonsall, Thomas E. (2000). More Than They Promised: The Studebaker Story. Stanford, California: Stanford University Press. ISBN 978-0-8047-3586-5.
- Brooke, Lindsay (2008). Ford Model T: The Car That Put the World on Wheels. Minneapolis: Motorbooks. ISBN 978-0-7603-2728-9.
- Campbell, Linda; Newman, Andrew; Safransky, Sara; Stallmann, Tim (2020). "Labor Struggles". In Campbell, Linda; Newman, Andrew; Safransky, Sara; Stallmann, Tim (eds.). A People's Atlas of Detroit. Detroit: Wayne State University Press. pp. 30–34. ISBN 978-0-8143-4298-5.
- Dubofsky, Melvyn (1969). We Shall Be All: A History of the Industrial Workers of the World. Chicago: Quadrangle Books. ISBN 978-0-812-96232-1.
- Esch, Elizabeth D. (2018). The Color Line and the Assembly Line: Managing Race in the Ford Empire. Berkeley, California: University of California Press. ISBN 978-0-520-96088-6.
- Foner, Philip S. (1965). History of the Labor Movement in the United States. Vol. IV: The Industrial Workers of the World, 1905–1917. New York City: International Publishers. ISBN 978-0-717-80396-5.
- Goldstein, Robert Justin (2001). Political Repression in Modern America: From 1870 to 1976. Urbana, Illinois: University of Illinois Press. ISBN 978-0-252-06964-2.
- Greenberg, Brian; Watts, Linda S. (2009). Walkowitz, Daniel J.; Bender, Daniel E. (eds.). Social History of the United States: The 1900s. Santa Barbara, California: ABC-Clio. ISBN 978-1-59884-128-2.
- Hermann, Christoph (2014). Capitalism and the Political Economy of Work Time. New York City: Routledge. ISBN 978-1-317-59634-9.
- Hillstrom, Laurie Collier (2006). "Labor Organizations and Reform Movements". In Hillstrom, Kevin; Hillstrom, Laurie Collier (eds.). The Industrial Revolution in America: Automobiles. Santa Barbara, California: ABC-Clio. pp. 103–122. ISBN 978-1-85109-749-4.
- Lewchuk, Wayne (1987). American Technology and the British Vehicle Industry. Cambridge: Cambridge University Press. ISBN 978-0-521-30269-2.
- Martelle, Scott (2012). Detroit: A Biography. Chicago: Chicago Review Press. ISBN 978-1-61373-069-0.
- May, Martha (1992). "The Historical Problem of the Family Wage: The Ford Motor Company and the Five Dollar Day". In Cott, Nancy F. (ed.). History of Women in the United States: Historical Articles on Women's Lives and Activities. Vol. 5: The Intersection of Work and Family Life. New York City: K. G. Saur. pp. 371–396. ISBN 978-3-11-096946-7.
- Peterson, Joyce Shaw (1987). American Automobile Workers, 1900–1933. Albany, New York: State University of New York Press. ISBN 978-0-88706-573-6.
- Smith, Mike (Fall 2001). ""Let's Make Detroit a Union Town": The History of Labor and the Working Class in the Motor City". Michigan Historical Review. 27 (2). Central Michigan University: 157–173. doi:10.2307/20173931. ISSN 0890-1686. JSTOR 20173931.
- Vargas, Zaragosa (1999). Proletarians of the North: A History of Mexican Industrial Workers in Detroit and the Midwest, 1917-1933. Berkeley, California: University of California Press. ISBN 978-0-520-21962-5.
- Woodford, Arthur M. (2001). This is Detroit, 1701-2001: An Illustrated History. Detroit: Wayne State University Press. ISBN 978-0-8143-2914-6.
