= Glossary of Wobbly terms =

Terms, jargon and slang used by members of the Industrial Workers of the World union

Wobbly lingo is a collection of technical language, jargon, and historic slang used by the Industrial Workers of the World, known as the Wobblies, for more than a century. Many Wobbly terms derive from or are coextensive with hobo expressions used through the 1940s.

== Origin and usage ==
Words and phrases in Wobbly lingo may have different meanings in different contexts or in different geographic areas. The "lingo" developed from the specific needs of the organization as well as the experiences of working-class people. For several decades, many hobos in the United States were members of, or were sympathetic to, the Industrial Workers of the World (IWW). Because of this, some of the terms describe the life of a hobo such as "riding the rails", living in "jungles", dodging the "bulls". The IWW's efforts to organize all trades allowed the lingo to expand to include terms relating to mining camps, timber work, and farming. Other derivations of Wobbly lingo come from a confluence of Native American languages, immigrant languages, and jargon. These meanings may vary over time.

Some words and phrases believed to have originated within Wobbly lingo have gained cultural significance outside of the IWW. For example, from Joe Hill's song "The Preacher and the Slave", the expression pie in the sky has passed into common usage, referring to a "preposterously optimistic goal."

== Glossary ==
=== A ===
Accommodation
Local freight train
AFL
American Federation of Labor, frequently referred to by Wobblies as the American Separation of Labor
Anchor
A pick
Angel food
Mission preaching about the Bread of Life
Assessment
In the IWW, a voluntary or mandatory contribution (depending on the situation) in addition to union dues allocated for specific purposes, such as a General Defense Committee action, a strike fund, or to help out a particular group of workers.
AWO (Agricultural Workers Organization)
The Agricultural Workers Industrial Union 400 (now IU 110) of the IWW which organised itinerant harvest workers between 1914 and 1930. The AWO developed the roving delegate system, still used today by the IWW.
Axle swinging
Riding under a railroad car

=== B ===
Balloon
Bedroll, bindle
Banjo
A short-handled shovel, or a type of frying pan
Barnacle
A fellow who sticks to one job for a year or longer; probably named for the stubborn tenacity of barnacles which must be scraped from the exterior surface of ocean-going vessels
Battleship
A high-sided steel coal car usually with a hopper or dump bottom
Battleship, building the
Raising the noise level to intolerable levels, by all means necessary including singing, pounding on bars, or slamming beds, by a group of Wobblies who have been imprisoned during a free speech fight
Beanmaster
Cook
Big O
A train conductor
Big Ole
A worker who tries to impress the boss with his ability or strength
Big Smoke, the
Pittsburgh, Pennsylvania
Bindle
Bedroll in which a hobo wrapped his possessions
Bindle stiff
An itinerant worker
Black cat
See Sab cat
Blind pig
Illegal bar during prohibition. Blind pigs differed from speakeasies in that only liquor was offered – no music or dancing.
Blue streak
Very fast
'Bo
Hobo
Boil up
To cook one's clothes, to eliminate "crums" (lice and their eggs).
Boomer
Construction worker who travels to the job, a transient railroad worker, or a seasonal or migratory worker
Booming
Going from one job to another
Branch
A chartered group of IWW members in the same job site, city, or region organised around a common workplace, industry, or regional grouping.
Bridal chamber
A mining term meaning the miner's workplace. May also mean a flop house where the guests lie on the floor
Braky
A brakeman
Bread and Milk Route
Boston & Maine Railroad
Broken & Maimed
Boston & Maine Railroad
Bucko mate
Bully
Bull
Policeman, or a railroad enforcer
Bullpen
A makeshift pen designed to hold class war prisoners. Temporary holding facilities for rebellious workers trying to organize into unions were referred to as bullpens. These military prisons were sometimes literally pens normally used for cattle which were pressed into service by stringing barbed wire, establishing a guarded perimeter, and keeping large numbers of men confined in the enclosed space. These "bullpens" have been considered early versions of concentration camps,
Bummery
A pejorative term used by Daniel De León that referred to the Direct Action faction of the IWW that led to the 1908 split; this expression was said to result from IWW members singing the song, "Hallelujah, I'm A Bum". Also used to refer to IWW members with itinerant employment, such as lumber workers and agricultural workers. Also called "110 Cats".
Bum on the plush
The idle rich. See Plush, on the
Bundle tosser
Harvest hand who pitches bundles. The bundles were also sometimes referred to as "bouquets".
Burg
Town

=== C ===
Cacklers
White collar workers
Calaboose
Jail
California blankets
Newspapers used for blankets while sleeping
Can
Jail
Candy job
A pleasant or "sweet" job
Canned Meat & Stale Punk
Chicago, Milwaukee, St. Paul and Pacific Railroad
Cannon ball
A fast train
Captain
Hobo salutation of the head man or big shot
Card man
A person with a red IWW card, such as a person in a union or a hobo
Car knocker
A railroad yard man who works assembling trains
The Carry All
Chicago & Alton RR
Carry the banner
To walk the street all night for want of shelter
Cat
Worker with a particular occupation; a worker well fitted in with some occupational subculture, such as "hep cat"; a worker who follows a specific occupation, such as "straw cat" for harvest hand. Or, sabotage cat.
Cat wagon
Brothel on wheels that might follow the harvest crews
Cattle stiff
A cowboy
Centralists
During the 1920s split, one of the factions headed by Tom Doyle and Joe Fisher. They wanted a strong central organisation with control over the IWW's industrial unions. Also referred to as the "Four Treyers".
Charter
A document issued by the GEB or a GOC that officially recognises a subordinate body of the IWW, such as a branch or district council.
Checkerboard crew
Mixed crew of white and black workers
Chinwhisker
A farmer
Christ killing
To speak from the soap box giving the economic argument
Citizens of industry
A term used by diehard Wobblies as a description of themselves, having come to the conclusion that national citizenship offered little to wage slaves
Class War
The struggle between the employing class (always looking to lower the costs of labour at workers' expense) and the working class (seeking to retain all that it produces).
Class War Prisoner
Anyone jailed for their class conscious views or acts.
Clover kicker
Farmer
Coal passer
Fireman
Coffee an'
Coffee and a doughnut
Coffin society
See coffin benefits
Coffin benefits
Trade union welfare systems that Wobblies sometimes disparaged as a dubious contribution from business unionism. "Gomperite" business unions that emphasised sickness and death benefits were referred to as "coffin societies".
Coldcock
To knock someone down
Cold, Hungry & Damp
Cincinnati, Hamilton and Dayton Railway
Come to Jesus
A "come-to-Jesus manner" means to feign piety
Cooperative Commonwealth
The ideal of a new social order which recognises no national, occupational, or racial distinctions and represents the united economic force and social will of all workers in the world. Similar concepts include the Workers Commonwealth, and the Industrial Commonwealth
Coupon clipper
A person of leisure with investment income. At one time, coupon booklets were given to investors, and the coupons were clipped out and mailed in to collect that period's income.
Cousin Jack
Generally refers to a Cornish miner, but, like the term Cockney, may be applied to any Englishman
Crooked arm
Signal from the boss that he wants more speed
Crums
Lice
Crummy
To be lousy, to have lice. Also refers to the caboose on a train
Crum up
boil up
CST (Central Secretary-Treasurer)
The chief administrative officer of the IWW's General Defense Committee. The CST is elected annually to a one year term by a democratic vote of the entire IWW membership.
Cushions, Riding the
Riding de luxe in a passenger train. Also see on the plush

=== D ===
Dehorn
Denatured alcohol or bootleg whiskey of inferior quality; anything that makes a worker depart from proper class-conscious activity.
Dehorn squad
Wobbly committee that would close up bars, speakeasies, and brothels during an IWW strike (usually during the Prohibition Era).
Delegate
An IWW member empowered to collect dues from other members, sign up new IWW members, and represent the group of IWW members they represent at district councils and other assemblies of the IWW. Delegates are democratically elected by shops and branches; they serve one-year terms.
Department
An international co-ordinating body of closely related Industrial Unions, such as the Department of General Construction 300, which includes the General Construction Workers Industrial Union 310, the Ship Builders Industrial Union 320, and the Building Construction Workers Industrial Union 330. There are six such departments outlined by the IWW Constitution.
Dingoes
Hoboes who refuse to work even though they claim to be looking for a job. "Tramp" is similar – a hobo who would not work.
Direct action
Actions taken by workers for themselves, as opposed to actions taken in their name by legislative or other representatives. Economic action, as opposed to political action
Doughhead
A baker
Doughnut philosopher
A fellow who is satisfied with the price of a coffee and feed. He does not object to the doughnut hole getting larger because it will take more dough to go around it. He is the original breadline optimist
Dual carder
Having a union card in two different unions. See dual unionism
Duds
Clothes
Dyno or dino
A rock man who handles dynamite, sometimes called a "powder monkey".

=== E ===
Eagle eye
Locomotive engineer
Economic argument
Soap-box talk about economics. Generally opposed to the religious argument called angel food
E-P (Emergency Program)
A split from the IWW in 1924, led by James Rowan of the Lumber Workers Industrial Union (LWIU). The E-Pers believed that the administration of the IWW was too strongly emphasising "Political Action" as opposed to Organizing on the Job. The E-P claimed to oppose "centralism" in favour of "decentralism", but the E-P sought to centralise power within individual Industrial Unions.
EP'er
Someone from the decentralist EP faction during the 1920s
Extra gang
A crew that works on the railroad track

=== F ===
Fast Rattler
An express train
Fellow Worker (FW)
How IWW members traditionally address each other (e.g. FW Lucy Parsons, or FW Ben Fletcher). Although the term is actually gender neutral, recently some members have adopted the unofficial term "Sister Worker" to refer to women members of the IWW. Some women prefer the term, but others do not.
Fielder
A brakeman
Fink
A strike breaker; an informer; possibly derived from "Pinkertons", a private detective agency frequently used by employers to break strikes. Or from the German 'fink' (finch) as in "a little bird told me"
Fix the Job
Direct Action on the job; quickie strikes, passive resistance, deliberate bungling aimed to win better working conditions.
Flipping a rattler
Boarding a moving box-car
Flop
A place to sleep.
Fly-away
A deserter from the army or navy
Footloose
A worker who is not tied down by a job is said to be footloose
Foul Water & Dirty Cars
Fort Worth & Denver City RR
4-3 (Four-Trey)
The loyalist faction from the 1924 split; so named because its office was located at 3333 West Belmont in Chicago, IL.
Free speech fights
When the cops won't let you speak, call all footloose rebels to town.
Frogskin
Dollar bill

=== G ===
Galoot
A fellow who doesn't fit in
Gandy dancer
Someone who lays, or especially, maintains, railroad track
GDC (General Defense Committee)
An organisation composed of IWW members and supporters whose function is to organise for the defence of workers indicted in the process of union organising or other revolutionary activity. The GDC can be organised into locals and regional federations. The GDC is the only official committee that sympathetic employers may join (as non-IWW members).
GDC Local
A Local branch of the General Defense Committee.
GEB (General Executive Board)
The chief co-ordinating body of the Industrial Workers of the World, consisting of seven members elected to one year terms annually by a democratic vote of the entire IWW membership. The GEB's duties are outlined by Article III, Section 5A of the IWW Constitution.
General Assembly (GA)
An annual assembly, held (US) Labor Day Weekend, where members, delegates and officers of the union meet to discuss union business, prepare for the annual election and referendum, and set union policy. The decisions of the General Assembly are subject to review by the entire IWW membership.
Glom the guts of a rattler
Hop a freight
GMB (General Membership Branch)
A chartered body of IWW members located in a local geographic area (usually a city or metropolitan area) composed of workers from many different industries. A GMB is a temporary structure designed to aid in the formation of Industrial Union Branches.
GOB (General Organization Bulletin)
A (mostly) monthly, printed discussion bulletin issued to all members in good standing (except those who specifically ask not to receive it). The GOB includes the GST's report, the GEB report, Delegates reports, and branch reports. Sometimes the GOB includes correspondence from individual members as well.
GOC (General Organizing Committee)
The chief co-ordinating body of an Industrial Union consisting of five members elected annually to a one-year term by a democratic vote of the membership of that Industrial Union.
Gomperite
From Samuel Gompers, disparaging term for AFL style business unionism, or advocates thereof.
Goon
A thug
Graveyard shift
Night work
Greasy spoon
A cheap cafe, restaurant, or truck stop
GRU (General Recruiting Union)
A chartered body consisting of members in multiple industries with fewer members in each industry than the number needed to form an IUB for each industry. Also called a Mixed Local.
GST (General Secretary-Treasurer)
The chief administrative officer of the IWW. The GST is elected annually to a one year term by a democratic vote of the entire IWW membership. The GST is the only paid officer of the IWW.
Gunnells or guts
The rods or trucks of the train where hobos ride
Gunsel
A thug with a gun; the same term is used in the gangland world.
Gyppo
Any piece-work system; a job where the worker is paid by the volume they produce, rather than by their time. A sub-contractor with poor equipment

=== H ===
Hall Cat
An IWW Member who frequents IWW union halls, sometimes refers to a branch secretary-treasurer.
Hasher
Cook
Hayrick
A hay stack
Haywire
When everything is balled up
Highball
Very fast, as in a fast train. See Cannonball. Also, a pejorative term for a lumber company that throws men at the forest without regard for their safety, with an eye to cutting as much as it can as fast as it can. I.e., "a highball outfit".
Highjack
To rob, or hold up
Hit the ball
To speed up on the job
Hit the grit
To be forced off a fast moving train
Hobo
A term of unknown origin that refers to an itinerant worker who "rides the rails" (stowing away on freight trains unknown to the railroads) in search of work. Not to be confused with "bums", "tramps" or "yeggs" who simply ride the rails looking for an easy mark. Many Hoboes were IWW members between 1905 and 1920s.
Hobo jungle
A well organised hobo encampment, maintained collectively by those that live there. Hobo jungles frequently offered a place for the hobo to lay his or her bindle, meals (cobbled together from food contributed by residents of the encampment), information about work, and music & song (provided by the hoboes themselves). Jungles were commonly frequented by IWW members between 1905 and 1920s.
Hog, on the
Broken down, broke, out of money. Contrast with eating high on the hog, an American phrase suggesting affluent, perhaps eating the better cuts
Hogger
A locomotive engineer.
Home Guard
IWW members with relatively stable employment and places of residence (as opposed to the bummery), such as the Lawrence textile workers.
Honey dipping
Working as a shovel stiff in a sewer
Hoosegow
Jail
Hoosier
A farmer, someone from the country, someone who is incompetent
Hoosier up
To play dumb, or pretend innocence
House dog
A fellow who hunts jobs from the housewife, such as beating carpets, etc.
Hot
A square meal. Room and board may be referred to as "three hots and a cot". Also, a fugitive hobo.

=== I ===
IDC (Industrial District Council)
A chartered regional co-ordinating body consisting of a council of delegates elected from the IUBs, Job Branches, IOCs, and GRUs in the same city or region.
Industrial Union (IU)
All the workers in the same industry shall belong to the same Industrial Union within the IWW. A chartered Industrial Union will consist of all Industrial Union Branches, shops within that IU, and individual members within that IU. That IU shall elect a GOC according to the principles they charter. The term also refers to the name and number assigned to each individual member. The numbers have no particular meaning other than to distinguish each separate IU.
Industrial unionism
A union organising philosophy in which all workers in an industry join the same union. The IWW takes this concept to its logical conclusion, such that all workers join One Big Union and support each other's struggles.
Industrial Worker (IW)
The official newspaper of the IWW, it is published monthly and available to all members in good standing. It is also available to non-members by subscription. Its editor is elected biannually to a two-year term by a democratic vote of the entire IWW membership.
International Workers of the World
The IWW has often been mistakenly called "International Workers of the World". Historian Conlin attributes the term in part to historians of the 1940s and later who were guilty of sloppy scholarship – "The historians were not only failing to read Brissenden, they were not taking a very good look at his title page." The conservative media pundit Rush Limbaugh blamed the anti-WTO demonstrations in Seattle in 1999 on the "International Workers of the World". In the indexes of the books Timber Wars by Judi Bari and Been and Done by Gipsy Moon, the IWW was incorrectly listed under this name, although they were correctly named in the text. Fred Chase (GST of the IWW, Jan 1995 – Dec 1999) once joked that the Industrial Workers of the World should ask the International Workers of the World to join up, since they're such a large and influential organisation. This mistake happens commonly, although the word International would obviously be redundant because of the words of the World.
IOC (Industrial Organizing Committee)
A standing committee of members of a GMB grouped by Industrial Union working to build Job Branches and IUBs.
IUB (Industrial Union Branch)
A chartered body of IWW members located in a local geographic area (usually a city or metropolitan area) composed of workers from the same industry.
IWW
Stands for Industrial Workers of the World of course, but has led to numerous other interpretations of the name, such as "I Won't Work", "I Want Whiskey", "International Wonder Workers", and "Irresponsible Wholesale Wreckers". On 17 August 1917, the Arizonan Senator Henry F. Ashurst even declared that "I.W.W. means simply, solely and only, Imperial Wilhelm's Warriors", falsely alleging a link between the IWW and German emperor Wilhelm II.

=== J ===
Java
Coffee
Jawbone
Credit. To buy in the company store against one's pay
Jerries
Men who work on the section gang, or Jerry Gang. They do section maintenance work while gandy dancers work on contract jobs
Jerusalem Slim
Jesus, a secular folk hero. The name was adopted by Wobblies who believed that Jesus would have been an IWW member had he lived in their time, based on interpretation of New Testament Scripture that indicates that Jesus was likely a radical in his time, much like the Wobblies of today.
Jim Hill
Railroad tycoon James J. Hill
Jim Hill's goat
In North America, the Great Northern Railway which ran from St. Paul to Seattle. Also called the Big "G", or the High Line. The company logo was originally a silhoutte of a mountain goat, later an anthropomorphic goat displaying the company name.
Job Branch
A chartered body of five or more members in the same workplace (and by extension, the same IU) where union conditions do not prevail, working to build majority union representation.
Job-ites
Referred to members of local unions who did not participate in discussions or voting while they were away working. This latter term typically referred to migratory workers.
Job Shop
A chartered body of IWW members in the same workplace (and by extension the same IU) where union conditions prevail and where majority union representation has been established.
John Family
A term sometimes applied to the farmers
Jungle
Hobo camp along a road or a railroad line. See also hobo jungle

=== K ===
Kangaroo court
Mock court held in jail for the purpose of forcing new prisoners to divide their money
Kazoo
Someone's butt
Kicks
Shoes. Also called slides

=== L ===
Labor skate
A union official who sees union office as a means to privilege and power
Little Red Songbook (LRS)
A collection of labour songs written by IWW members "to fan the flames of discontent", published as a pocket size book with a red cover. There are at least 36 editions of the LRS.
Lizzie, tin
A Model T or a cheap auto

=== M ===
Main Drag
The primary street in a town; may or may not also be the "main stem".
Main stem
The chief hobo street in town
Mick
An Irishman
Milk and Honey route
Railroads through Mormon territory
Mister Block
A scissorbill. The term refers to the cartoons penned by Ernest Riebe about a blockheaded worker who, in spite of all his misfortunes, blindly sides with the employing class. He believes that the police always mean well, and that sharks are good fellows. Joe Hill popularised the cartoon in his song "Mr Block".
MTW (Marine Transport Workers)
The Marine Transport Workers Industrial Union 510 of the IWW, active on the seas, especially on the west coast of North America. The MTW led to the formation of the Sailors Union of the Pacific (SUP) of the AFL, and participated in the 1934 General Strike of west coast Longshoremen. The MTW also controlled the Philadelphia waterfront in the 1920s and 1930s. MTW Local 8 of Philadelphia was led by Ben Fletcher. Also sometimes referred to as "510 Cats".
Muckamuck, muckymuck, or mucketymuck
Someone important, and probably arrogant. Hyas muckamuck from Chinook Jargon (literally, "big food", a reference to the quantity and quality of food eaten by the noble class) means the chief or the big boss. In modern blue collar usage, this word is one of many mildly sarcastic slang terms used to refer to bosses and upper management. A variation is a phrase high muckety-muck.
Mucker
A mine worker who shovels out the ore or the debris
Muck stick
A long-handled shovel
Mug
Someone's face

=== N ===
Never Come, Never Go
Nevada County Narrow Gauge RR (Calif.)
Nose bag
A lunch pail

=== O ===
OBU (One Big Union)
Another name for the IWW, based on the notion that one big union of all the workers can overthrow or abolish the employing class and the wage system. Also a name for a short-lived Canadian union that formed in the 1930s based on the IWW, but more sympathetic to the Communist Party and Stalinism.
Octopus
The Southern Pacific Railroad
Original Ham and Egg Route
Oberlin, Hampton and Eastern RR
Overalls Brigade
At the 1908 convention a group of twenty migrant workers styling themselves as the "overalls brigade" played a crucial role in the debate which established direct action as the guiding principle of the IWW. The overalls brigade was led by popular organiser James H. Walsh, who would later play a key role in the IWW's free speech fights

=== P ===
Paul Bunyan
A chronic but interesting liar
Pay streak
A job that pays well
Pea soup
A French Canadian, often a lumberjack; the name comes from a traditional dish of this group.
Pennsylvania feathers
Soft coal or coke
Piecard
A union official that identifies more with the boss than with the workers, or who is "on the take". From the hobo definition, one who hangs around and lives on a remittance man or some other person with money
Pie in the sky
A reward in heaven for working hard on earth while hungry. Used in the song The Preacher and the Slave by Joe Hill.
Play the Hoosier
Dissatisfied workers on the job who intentionally fail to work efficiently are "playing the Hoosier"
Plough jockey
A farmer
Plug-ugly
A thug or a goon
Plush, on the
The rich man rides on the plush in the train, possibly in a private car. Described in the Utah Phillips song/poem Bum on the Rods, included on the album/CD "The Past Didn't Go Anywhere." The poem is originally entitled The Two Bums, from George Milburn's book, The Hobo's Hornbook.
Plutes
Bosses or plutocrats
Poke
A leather wallet
Pork chop unionism
A Wobbly epithet for business unionism
Prole
A wage worker, a "proletarian."
Propaganda of the deed
An anarchist expression which helped to inspire the concept of direct action
Pure and simpler
Someone who accepts the "pure and simple unionism" of the American Federation of Labor. Among revolutionary industrial unionists, a "pure and simpler" was someone, perhaps a conservative socialist, whose view could not easily be distinguished from that of AFL style unionists
Pusher
The straw boss. One in charge of the job

=== R ===
Rattler
A freight train
Rebel
A class-conscious worker who wishes to end the capitalist system.
The Rebel Girl
Elizabeth Gurley Flynn; also the title of a song by Joe Hill.
Red
A revolutionary socialist, anarchist, or IWW member. Refers to the red flags and banners commonly used by radicals symbolising workers control and revolution. After the 1930s, the term was specifically used to refer to leftists in general, but especially to members of the Communist Party and its supporters.

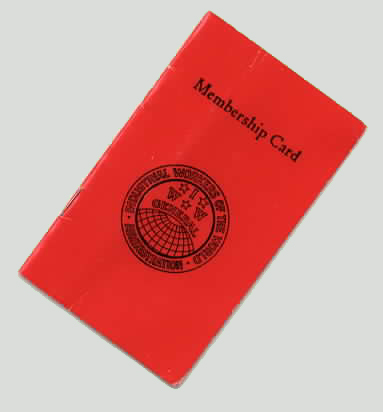
A Wobbly membership card, or "red card"

Red card
Membership card for IWW members
Red IWW
The IWW, based in Chicago (until the 1990s) as opposed to the short-lived rival IWW established by Daniel DeLeon in 1908. See Yellow IWW
Red Socialists
Refers to the left wing of the US based Socialist Party. The Reds were sympathetic to the IWW, direct action, and syndicalism.
Riding the Rails; Riding the Rods
Travelling by railroad as a stowaway.
Rigging
A Delegate's supplies, including membership cards, dues stamps, IWW Constitutions, and Newspapers. Used to collect dues and sign up new members on the job.
ROC (Regional Organizing Committee)
A body of IWW members in a specific region, especially a country dedicated to maintaining communication and administering union affairs, particularly where the local currency is worth significantly less (or more) than the US or Canadian dollar.
Rockpile
A jail
Rods
Drawrods beneath a freight train, one place where hobos used to ride. Riding the rods was extremely dangerous, and most modern train cars no longer have rods underneath.
Rotgut
Cheap liquor
Roustabout
An unskilled labourer. Also used as a carnival term
Rube
A country bumpkin

=== S ===
Sab cat
Symbol of the IWW, and sometimes a symbol for "sabotage" (i.e. inefficiency at the point of production by disgruntled workers), usually represented by a black cat with bared teeth. Also called "sab kitty", "sabo-tabby", or "the cat".
Sabotage
The withdrawal of efficiency. Calling a strike, engaging in a slowdown, or somehow gumming up the works. From a French phrase meaning to toss a wooden shoe (a sabot) into the machinery to slow things down.
The Saint
Refers to Vincent St. John
Sallies
Salvation Army hotels and industrial workshops
Scab
A strike breaker
Scissorbill
A worker who identifies with the boss, or who lacks class consciousness; hobo who thinks he can be President. A term for workers who "did not align themselves with members of the working class".
Scratch
Secretary; alternately, money or other assets
Sea stiff
A sailor
Secretary-Treasurer
The chief administrative officer of a branch or district council, elected by a democratic vote of the appropriate body's membership
Sewer hogs
Ditch diggers.
Shack
The brakeman on a train. Often the fellow that hobos had to avoid.
Shanty man
Same as gyppo contractor
Shark
An employment agent who "sells" jobs for a fee
Short Stake
Worker apt to quit when they have earned a small sum
Shuffler
A jobless worker
Shyster
A lawyer. Spoken in a non-pejorative fashion of labour attorneys
Side Door Pullman
A hobo term for a boxcar
Silent agitator
A sticker, or a mini-poster, used to propagandise. Sometimes called a silent organiser
Single O
Working alone by preference
Singlet
A man's jersey or undershirt
Sinker
A doughnut
Sizzler
A cook; alternately, a stove
Skid road
Area of town where migrants gather, from the log roads in timber country. Also called skid row
Skinner
One who drives mules, especially on construction jobs
Skipper
The conductor
Sky pilot
A highbrow preacher, one who expresses a boss point of view, that workers shouldn't complain – just be patient and you'll get "pie in the sky when you die." The term carried over to the US Military as a name for the company chaplain
Slave market
An employment agency, particularly in which there are high fees assessed for workers to get a job
SLP (Socialist Labor Party)
Founded as the Socialistic Labor Party in 1878. Played a founding role in the IWW under its leader, Daniel DeLeon. The SLP was a political party that emphasised political action rather than direct action (organising at the point of production.) The SLP separated from the IWW in 1908 and set up a short-lived, rival union called the Yellow IWW. This SLP IWW "changed its name to Workers' International Industrial Union in 1915."
Slum
Food
Smilo joint
A tavern that sold bootleg liquor
Snake
Hobo and railroad term for switchman. A snake is more friendly than a shack to the hobos
Snipe
(Noun) A section hand. (Verb) To get cigarette or cigar butts from easy sources. ("I sniped a nice butt from that ashtray")
Speakeasy
An illegal bar during Prohibition days, frequently offering music, food and dancing besides.
Spittoon philosopher
A hanger-on about the gin mill or along the curbstone
Split
At the 1924 convention, two factions appeared in the IWW. They each claimed to be the real IWW. In some cities there were two IWW halls, and Job Delegates for each union had their own cards to issue.
Stake
A sum of money intended to last until the next job.
Stamps
Dues stamps for the IWW, pasted into a Wobbly's red card, or dues book to show that the member is paid up
Stamp up
To pay dues, or to collect dues from an IWW member
Starvation Army
The Salvation Army, as referred to in the song The Preacher and the Slave
Stew builder
A camp cook
Stiff
A worker. For example, harvest stiffs, bridge stiffs, hospital stiffs
Stoolie
An informer (stool pigeon)
Stump Rancher
Someone who settles on logged off land and who usually continues to work, at least part time, for wages.
Swamper
Fellow who cleans out the bar-room
Sweat board
Concrete mixing by hand

=== T ===
Taking the whiskers off
Harvesting
Tallow pot
The fireman on the train
Texas t-shirt
Paper toilet seat cover
Tie pass
Bogus permit from the railroad president allowing one to walk the railroad ties
Timber Beast
Lumberjack. Sometimes also called a Timber Wolf
Tinhorn
A smalltime gambler
Tramps
Migrating non-working vagrants
Twist a dream
Roll a cigarette

=== U ===
Union scab
One who continues at work at his particular trade when those of an allied trade in the same industry are on strike, often because his craft has a contract with the employer (Note: "It was with the song "Casey Jones, the Union Scab" that Joe Hill first became popular within the I.W.W. It is based on the song "Casey ..")

=== V ===
Vittles
Food

=== W ===
Walking Delegate
A union organiser who moves from job to job.
WFM (Western Federation of Miners)
One of the original unions that founded the IWW. Founding Members William "Big Bill" Haywood and Vincent Saint John were also members of the WFM.
Wobbly (Sometimes shortened to "Wob")
A nickname of unknown origin for a member of the Industrial Workers of the World. Many believe "wobbly" refers to a tool known as a "wobble saw." One often repeated anecdote has it that a sympathetic Chinese restaurant owner in Vancouver would extend credit to IWW members and, unable to pronounce the "W", would ask if they were a member of the "I Wobble Wobble." Another explanation is that the term was first used pejoratively by San Francisco Socialists around 1913 and adopted by IWWs as a badge of honour. In any case, the nickname has existed since the union's early days and is still used today.
Wood butcher
A carpenter or a hobo who can do general repair jobs
Woolies
Take a job as sheep herder

=== Y ===
Yard master
Railroad employee who supervises the yard activity
Yeggs
Crooks. Lazy people, tramps.
Yellow IWW
A rival version of the IWW established in 1908, based in Detroit by Daniel DeLeon, after he split from the IWW. The Yellow IWW emphasised political action as opposed to direct action at the point of production. The Yellow IWW was affiliated with the Socialist Labor Party (SLP). The Yellow IWW "renamed itself the Workers' International Industrial Union (WIIU) in 1915". Also called "yellow wobbly"
Yellow Socialists
Refers to the right wing and centrists of the US based Socialist Party. The Yellows were generally hostile to the IWW (favoring the craft unionism of the AFL, advocating reform, such as through the mechanisms of political processes, (Note: "The "yellow" Socialists believe that they can gradually gain this political power by using the political machinery of the capitalist State to win reforms, and when they have elected a majority of the members of Congress and the Legislatures, and ...") instead of revolution (Note: "Many of the stogie workers were "yellow Socialists" and opposed the I.W.W.'s ideology, especially sabotage. However, they agreed to affiliate with the ...") among unionists), direct action, and syndicalism.

== See also ==
- Chinook Jargon, especially for northwest timber country usage.
- Shibboleth
