= Pyramid of Capitalist System =

Anti-Capitalist cartoon caricature from 1911

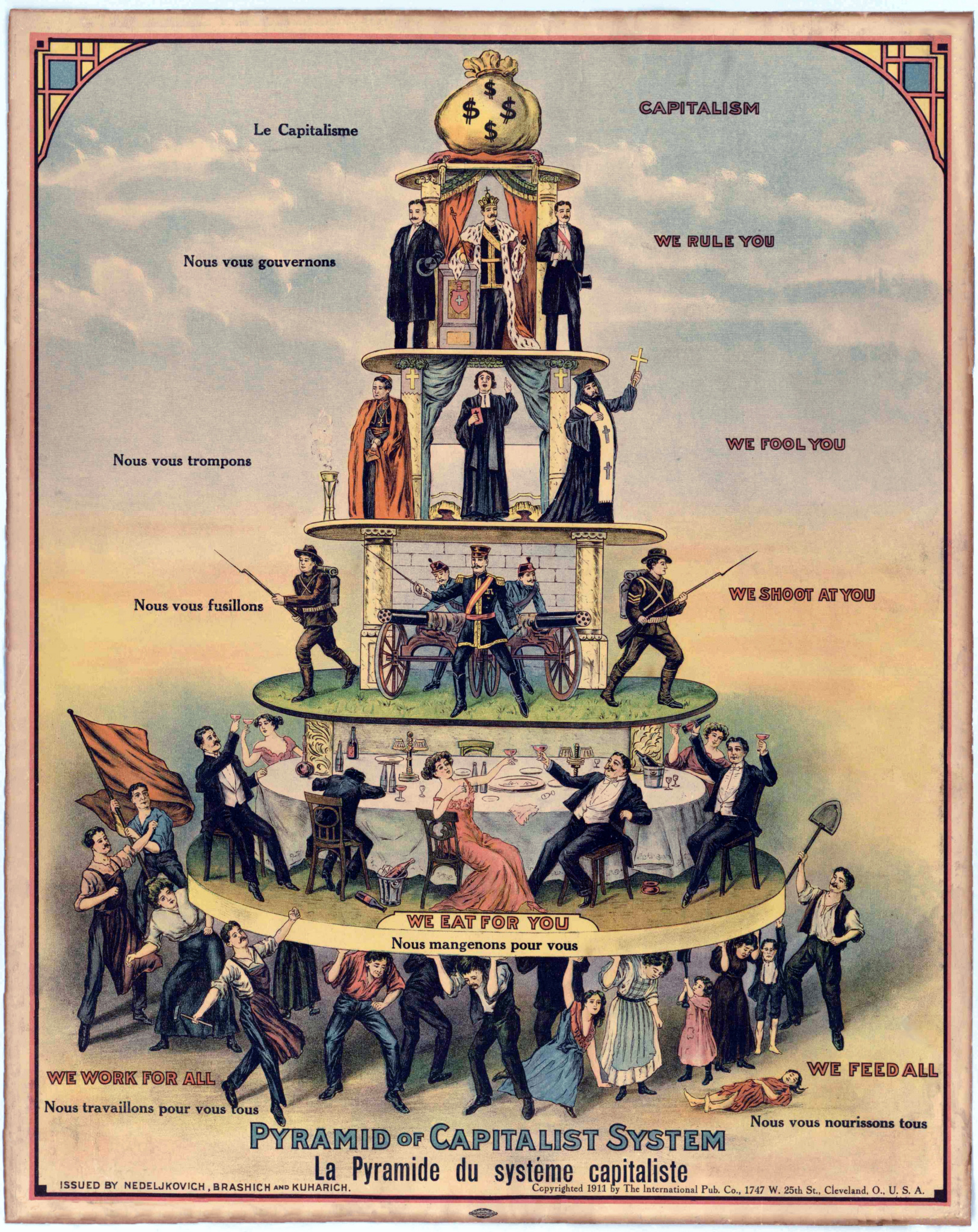
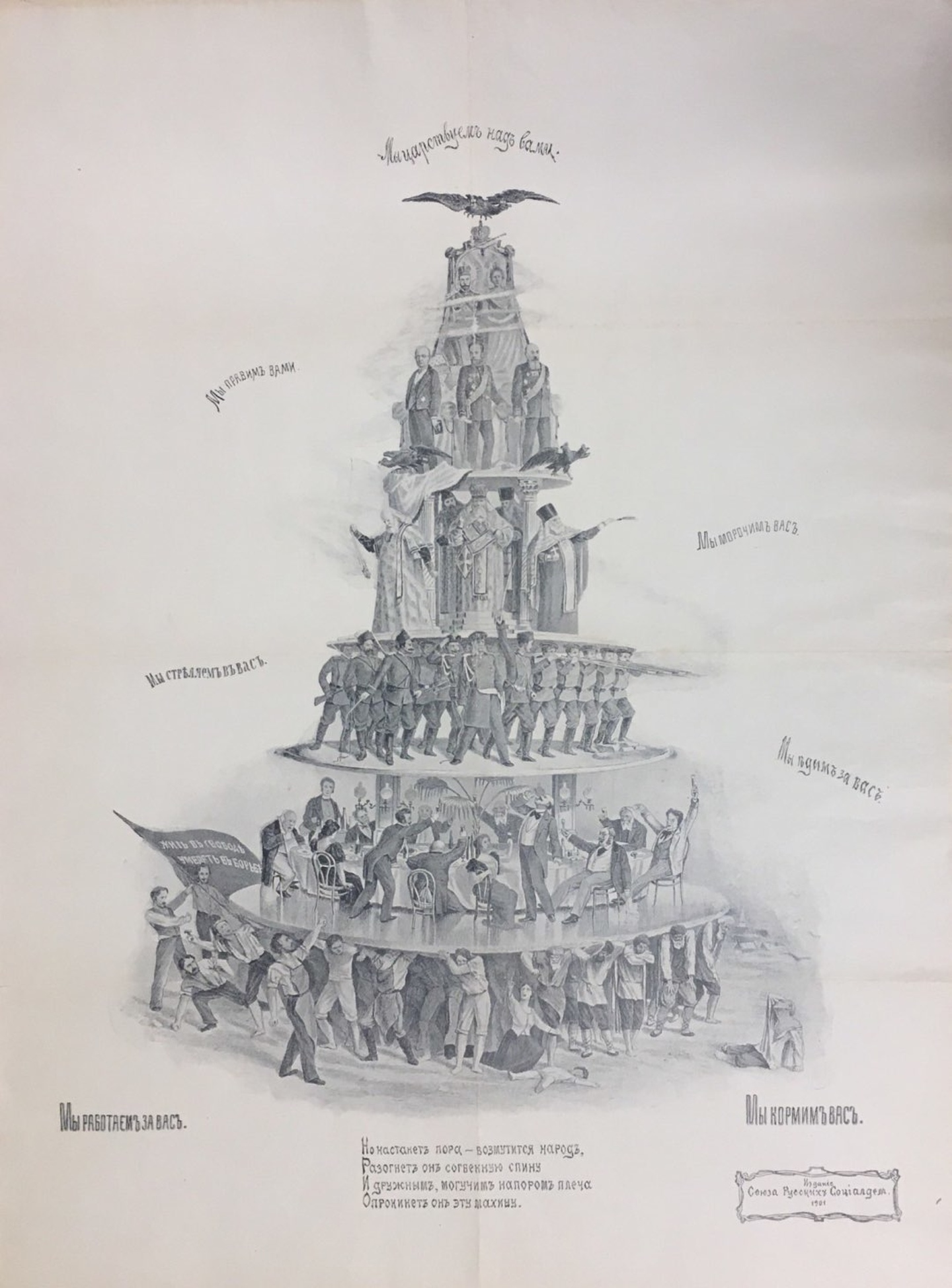
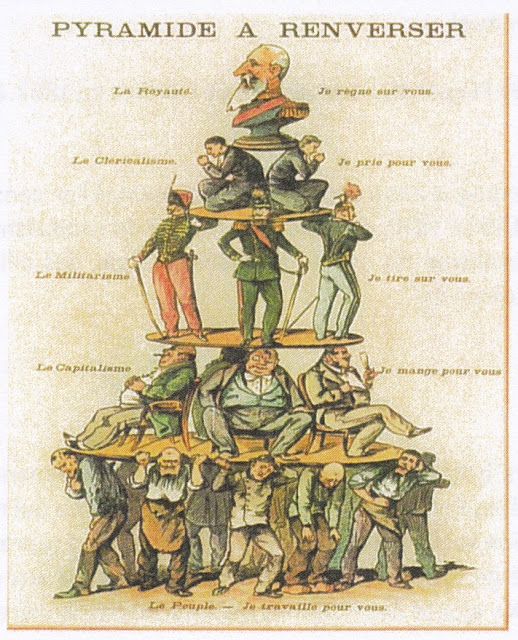
The 1911 American cartoon (top), Nicolas Lokhoff's "Social Pyramid", 1901 (bottom-left) and the poster of the Belgian Labour Party 1900 (bottom-right)

The Pyramid of Capitalist System is a common name of a 1911 American cartoon caricature critical of capitalism, copied from a Russian flyer of c. 1901. The graphic focus is on stratification by social class and economic inequality. The work has been described as "famous", "well-known and widely reproduced". A number of derivative works exist.

It was published in 1911 by the Industrial Worker (The International Publishing Co., Cleveland, Ohio), a newspaper of the Industrial Workers of the World, and attributed to "Nedeljkovich, Brashich, & Kuharich".

The work is based on older similar pictures. In 1900, the Belgian Labour Party used a picture called "Pyramide à renverser" (lit. 'a pyramid that has to be overthrown') during its electoral campaign. A year later Nicolas Lokhoff's 1901 caricature of Imperial Russian society by the Union of Russian Socialists was published. The original picture showed workers supporting the pyramid on their backs, with the stanza: "The time will come when the people in their fury will straighten their bent backs and bring down the structure with one mighty push of their shoulders."

Notable differences between the Russian 1901 original and the American 1911 imitation include the replacement of the Russian Empire's black eagle with a money bag, the Russian tsar and tsarina with a more generic trio of a monarch and state leaders in suits, two of the three Orthodox clergy with a Catholic cardinal and a Protestant minister, and the Russian Empire army with a more generic group of soldiers; no revolutionary stanza is present. In both pictures, a fallen child or child worker symbolizes the plight of the workers. Another shared element is a red flag raised amongst the workers, symbolizing the emergence of the socialist movement.

The basic message of the image is a critique of the capitalist system, depicting a hierarchy of power and wealth. It illustrates a working class supporting all others, and if it withdrew its support from the system, it would topple the existing social order. This type of criticism of capitalism is attributed to the French socialist Louis Blanc.
