= Free speech fight =

Public protests for freedom of association and speech

Free speech fights are struggles over free speech, and especially those struggles which involved the Industrial Workers of the World and their attempts to gain awareness for labor issues by organizing workers and urging them to use their collective voice. During the World War I period in the United States, the IWW members (referred to as Wobblies), engaged in free speech fights over labor issues which were closely connected to the developing industrial world as well as the Socialist Party. The Wobblies, along with other radical groups, were often met with opposition (violent and otherwise) from local governments and especially business leaders, in their free speech fights.

The IWW organized transient workers (especially in cities in the American West) who worked in highly seasonal jobs—they met on the streets, discussed contemporary issues, and listened to speakers; at the time, it was a very popular method of organization. The events often ended with the police arresting them for participating in street meetings. The most notorious of all of the free speech fights was the San Diego free speech fight, which won a significant amount of public awareness for the IWW as it involved tremendous violence against the labor groups organized by the IWW. which brought the IWW to the greater notice of the American public and was notable for the intensity of violence by anti-labor vigilantes directed at the IWW; this violence included the kidnapping and tarring and feathering of Ben Reitman, who was a physician, and was Emma Goldman's lover.

More generally, a free speech fight is any incident in which a group is involved in a conflict over its speech. For instance, the Free Speech Movement, which began with a conflict on the Berkeley Campus in California in the 1960s, was a "free speech fight".

== "Free speech fights" and the IWW ==
The IWW engaged in free speech fights during the period from approximately 1907 to 1916. The Wobblies, as the IWW members were called, relied upon free speech, which in the United States is guaranteed by the First Amendment, to enable them to communicate the concept of One Big Union to other workers. In communities where the authorities saw their interests in avoiding the development of unions, the practice of soapboxing was frequently restricted by ordinance or by police harassment. The IWW employed a variety of creative tactics, including the tactic of flooding the area of a free speech fight with footloose rebels who would challenge the authorities by flouting the ordinance, intentionally getting arrested in great numbers. With the jails full and a seemingly endless stream of union activists arriving by boxcar and highway, the local communities frequently rescinded their prohibitions on free speech, or came to some other accommodation.

The Free Speech League, a progressive group which functioned at the same time as (and occasionally together with) the IWW, worked in conjunction with the IWW prior to World War I in many of their free speech fights, which generated a good deal of controversy. The free speech fights of the IWW were highly publicized, as they were designed to garner attention: they frequently started when local communities interjected to attempt to prevent the IWW from occupying street corners from which they would use provocative language to detail their radical beliefs. The free speech fights began occurring in 1906 and drew to a close by 1917—over that period of time, at least 26 communities played host to the IWW's free speech fights, and the years of 1909 to 1913 were particularly active, with at least 21 free speech fights happening.

The IWW members who engaged in the free speech fights typically cited the First Amendment and the rights guaranteed therein as proof positive of the validity of their cause, thereby highlighting the legal importance of the issues they fought for. That being the case, their struggles did not go unanswered or ignored: local, state, and even the federal government were prompted to respond, while, perhaps more importantly, the American public, due to the national publicity garnered by the free speech fights, were invariably tasked with confronting free speech issues. Practically all realms of American life were impacted by the free speech fights, as members of the press, church officials, school teachers, politicians, anyone involved in the business and labor world, and members of any organization (especially those of the Socialist Party) had a stake in the fights and thus attempted to comment on the issues in contention.

=== An overview of the free speech fights ===
From its inception, the IWW was deeply committed to free speech issues, and especially those affiliated with labor groups. The IWW formed in 1905 in response to dissatisfaction with the trade unions promoted by the American Federation of Labor (the AFL). Whereas the AFL promoted the ideals of capitalism by fighting for the rights of workers within the ideological framework of the free market system, the IWW functioned on anarchistic principles. Rather than urging workers to join unions based on craft and skill that were determined to form binding trade agreements with employers, the IWW advocated for the development of broad unions for low-skill workers that would be driven by the workers themselves (and their collective actions) rather than by top-down politics and binding capitalist decisions.

The primary vehicles of change for the free speech fights of the IWW were spontaneous workplace strikes as well as on-site labor slowdowns in addition to picketing, parades, and demonstrations. Importantly, the IWW engaged in street corner public displays and speaking to raise the public awareness regarding free speech fights. The desire for direct action by laborers was attributed to having grown disaffected with the beliefs of the AFL. They stressed their truly American origins and likened their actions to those of earlier American revolutionaries and activists.

The free speech fights of the IWW were often quite similar in nature: Wobblies (many of whom travelled across the country to spread their message) would visit a city's downtown and attempt to speak on soapboxes on street corners. Their message and their tactics were particularly provocative, and they were frequently arrested—though, if they were not arrested on one street corner, they would simply pack up and head to another one. Among the offences which they were arrested for were blocking traffic, vagrancy, unlawful assembly, or violating local ordinances such as ones against speaking on the streets.

Though the IWW was successful in many of their free speech fights, they did not always achieve their desired goals. In San Diego, for instance, they were unable to cause the repeal of a restrictive street ordinance while, in Paterson, they failed to gain protection for street picketing and meetings.

=== The IWW ideology of free speech ===
The ideology of the Wobblies who fought for free speech rights across America was deeply indebted to their core beliefs regarding the provenance of the First Amendment rights of the Constitution. In their estimation, they were fighting with the Constitution on their side while those who opposed them, such as city officials, were disregarding the fundamental laws of the country. The Wobblies frequently used phrases such as "Have you ever read the Constitution?" and "What is this, Czarist Russia, or Free America?"

The Wobblies held that the free speech rights granted by the First Amendment had been abridged over time, and they felt that it nowhere more evident than it was in the case of the laborers for whom they worked tirelessly—capitalism had conspired with the judicial system in the United States to deny agency and the Constitutionally-granted freedom of speech to American laborers. Not all Wobblies subscribed to such idealistic ideology, though, since some argued the more pessimistic belief that the Constitution had been written by the elites and that free speech was merely an illusion that worked to uphold the power of those same elites. By adopting aggressive tactics which flaunted local ordinances against free speech, the Wobblies courted arrest, which they used as a demonstration of how far the abridgement of free speech had come. The official attempts to silence the IWW in the free speech fights, they argued, were totally opposed to the spirit of the First Amendment.

According to the Wobblies, the fact that they even had to fight for free speech rights was evidence of the corrupting effect of capitalism in America and of its legal system. They argued that the Constitution was not being applied to American laborers, just as it had not been applied to slaves in the century prior. Rather than take their fights to the courts, which they felt were substantially corrupted by capitalist influence, they took their fight to the streets and urged other Americans to do the same.

The publications of the IWW urged people to "Educate, Agitate, Organize!!!" which led their opponents to see the fights for free speech as precursors to more insidious desires such as those for unionization and, especially, for the abolition of capitalism.

=== Popular reactions ===
The free speech fights of the IWW were inherently populist in nature. They were met with a variety of different public response and reactions: some supported their efforts and sought to collaborate with them while others engaged in vigilante violence against them (as was especially the case in San Diego). The free speech fights gained mass support from political groups such as labor unions, Socialists, and also the Free Speech League. Notably, few of the groups stood fast with the IWW when it came to their calls for revolution or for the overthrowing of capitalism more generally, and instead focused on the importance of the free speech rights for their own inherent worth to Americans. The AFL, though, opposed the IWW's efforts in the free speech realm from the get go. Other groups and members of the public, too, began to oppose the free speech fights over time because of the aggressive tactics and language among other things.

The Socialists were the most closely connected allies of the IWW in the free speech fights, as they had suffered through many years of free speech repression already and thus helped to fundraise for the cause and occasional even took part in the fights.

Labor unions also offered significant support to the free speech fight cause since they had a stake in the fights. Important support, still, came from the American public at large.

=== Official reactions and regulation of street speaking ===
The most notable proponent of the free speech fights in the official arena was New York City Police Commissioner Arthur Woods, who argued that all American groups should be granted the right of free speech and assembly. Rather than repress their constitutional rights, Woods felt that it was the duty of the police to protect the demonstrators. His personal philosophy dictated that free speech could be regulated only in ways that protected it through the creation of channels of expression which would not impede the rights of others.

The reasonable regulation of street speaking was an important issue that arose because of the free speech fights of the IWW. Their soapboxing on downtown street corners proved especially divisive. Whereas IWW supporters held that freedom of expression was especially important in the areas where that expression could actually reach the people (such as laborers) who would benefit the most from their message, opponents argued that their right to free speech did not belong in such public places where their incendiary tactics could be harmful to the public. Public streets were the best means of reaching the workers to whom their free speech fights were addressed, and the Wobblies did not always possess the necessary funds to rent out public assembly halls, for instance, from which they could exercise their right to free speech. The IWW conceded, nonetheless, that reasonable restrictions should be placed on public speaking.

The struggle over free speech on downtown street corners was regarded as absurd by many people, since there were myriad other areas in the public sphere that allowed outdoor speaking to take place—downtown street corners, though, were outlawed. The fight over the street corners, therefore, became a symbol of the divisive ideology of the IWW—their opponents scornfully argued that the street corners were important to the Wobblies only because they could not reach an audience elsewhere since nobody would willingly attend any of their speeches.

Many of the opponents of free speech fights, thus, were in favor of the establishment of centrally located areas that permitted oration but did not interfere with the city. Others, though, were totally opposed to the right to speak in public.

The IWW occasionally saw its fight over the regulation of street speaking extend to the judicial realm. More often than not, judges upheld the street ordinances that prevented public speaking. Notably, a judge in San Diego upheld the city's ordinance, and used the language of a similar decision in Los Angeles to explain that "This ordinance does not attempt to suppress freedom of speech, or seek to interfere with the citizen in the right to express his views upon any subject, political, religious, or otherwise, as is suggested by the petitioner. It simply specifies a certain district within the city wherein no one may do the things prohibited."

=== Analysis of free speech themes ===
One of the key themes of the free speech fights came from the regulation of speaking on the streets and involved discussions over the importance of access to public property and how reasonable limitations could be applied to it. People who debated the free speech fights frequently focused on the distinction between legal speech and illegal action while also detailing the various types of unprotected speech. They also debated what types of criticisms of the government should be protected by free speech.

One of the primary issues with the debates surrounding the free speech fights was that commentators understood that certain types of speech should be regarded as illegal and were not covered as free speech—sedition, libel, inciting speech, and obscenity fell into this category of speech, yet what some regarded as obscenity or libel, others regarded simply as government criticism that should be protected by the Constitution.

== Major IWW's free speech fights ==
=== Spokane free speech fight ===
In A History of American Labor, Joseph G. Rayback has written,

[The Industrial Workers of the World] made its first impression upon the nation through its involvement in the "free speech" fight begun in Spokane, Washington, employment center for the casual labor elements of the Pacific Northwest. The fight developed late in 1908 when the I.W.W. launched an extensive speaking campaign with the slogan "Don't Buy Jobs" in the streets around the Spokane employment agencies which had become skilled in the art of swindling men who applied for jobs.

The "job sharks" were so closely tied to the crew boss on many job sites that there would be "one gang coming, one gang working and one gang going." The faster the turnover, the greater the fees that could be generated. From time to time the men would ignore the IWW and seek revenge after an employment shark took someone's last dollar for a job that didn't exist. The Spokesman-Review of February 17, 1909 reported,

Hurling rocks and chunks of ice through the windows of the Red Cross Employment Agency, 224 Stevens St., several members of a noisy mob of between 2,000 and 3,000 idle men were about to attempt to wreck the place about 6 o'clock last evening, when James H. Walsh, organizer of the IWW, mounted a chair and pacified the multitude. In the opinion of the police had it not been for the intervention of Walsh, a riot would surely have followed, as the rabble was worked up to such a pitch that its members would have readily attempted violence. Walsh discouraged violence and summoned all members of the IWW to their hall at the rear of 312 Front Ave. The police dispersed the rest... At the hall Walsh warned the crowd against an outbreak. "There were a lot of hired Pinkertons in that crowd," he said. "All they wanted you fellows to do was to start something and then they would have an excuse for shooting you down or smashing your heads in... You can gain nothing by resorting to mob rule."

For the rest of the summer, IWW street meetings brought more and more working stiffs into the IWW.

The agencies promptly countered by pressuring the city council to pass an ordinance forbidding street speaking. The I.W.W. obeyed the regulation for nearly a year, until Spokane religious groups, which habitually used the streets, secured a new regulation exempting them from the street-speaking ordinance. Angered by the discrimination on behalf of "the Christers," the Spokane I.W.W. renewed its campaign.

The newspaper of the IWW, the Industrial Worker, published the following on October 28: "Wanted—Men to Fill the Jails of Spokane." Then the IWW sent out a notice to all locations, "Nov. 2, FREE SPEECH DAY—IWW locals will be notified by wire how many men to send if any... Meetings will be orderly and no irregularities of any kind will be tolerated."

In one day 150 men were arrested and crowded into jails that could hardly accommodate them. Reinforcements promptly arrived from the surrounding territory.

The Spokane City Council arranged for rock-pile work for the prisoners.

At the end of twenty days four hundred men had been jailed.

Overflowing prisoners were lodged in the Franklin School [then located along Front Street (now Trent)], and the War Department made Fort Wright available for more. Eight editors in succession got out a copy of the Industrial Worker, and then took their turn soapboxing, and went to jail. The IWW's "rebel girl," Elizabeth Gurley Flynn, who was fresh out of high school, delayed her arrest by chaining herself to a lamppost. She later charged that the police were using the women's section of the jail as a brothel, with police soliciting customers. When that story was printed in the Industrial Worker on December 10, the police attempted to destroy all copies. Public sympathy began to favor the strikers. When the prison guards would march the overflowing prisoners through the streets to bathing facilities, crowds would shower the men with apples, oranges, and Cigarettes. Around 10:30 AM on December 20, 1909, the I.W.W. Hall of Spokane was raided by police, driving 200 men out onto the street.

The effort brought results: the W.F.M. declared a boycott of all goods coming from Spokane, and taxpayers began to protest against the cost of feeding, housing, and policing the prisoners. When Vincent St. John publicly appealed to all Wobblies to come to Spokane to renew the struggle, city officials capitulated.

The victory for the free speech fight came on March 4, when the city of Spokane agreed to allow the I.W.W. to speak on the street. Subsequently that day, all arrested I.W.W. members were released. The licenses of 19 of the employment agencies were revoked.

The I.W.W. was granted freedom of assembly, freedom of the press, and the right to distribute its literature.

In Labor's Untold Story, Boyer and Morais observed,

The courts became so clogged they could handle little else but free speech cases. The fight for free speech became largely a question of endurance between the lungs and heads of the Wobblies and the stamina of the police. In Missoula and Spokane as in most of the other towns where free speech fights were waged, any citizen could address any assemblage on any street on any subject at any time by the end of 1912.

=== Missoula free speech fight ===
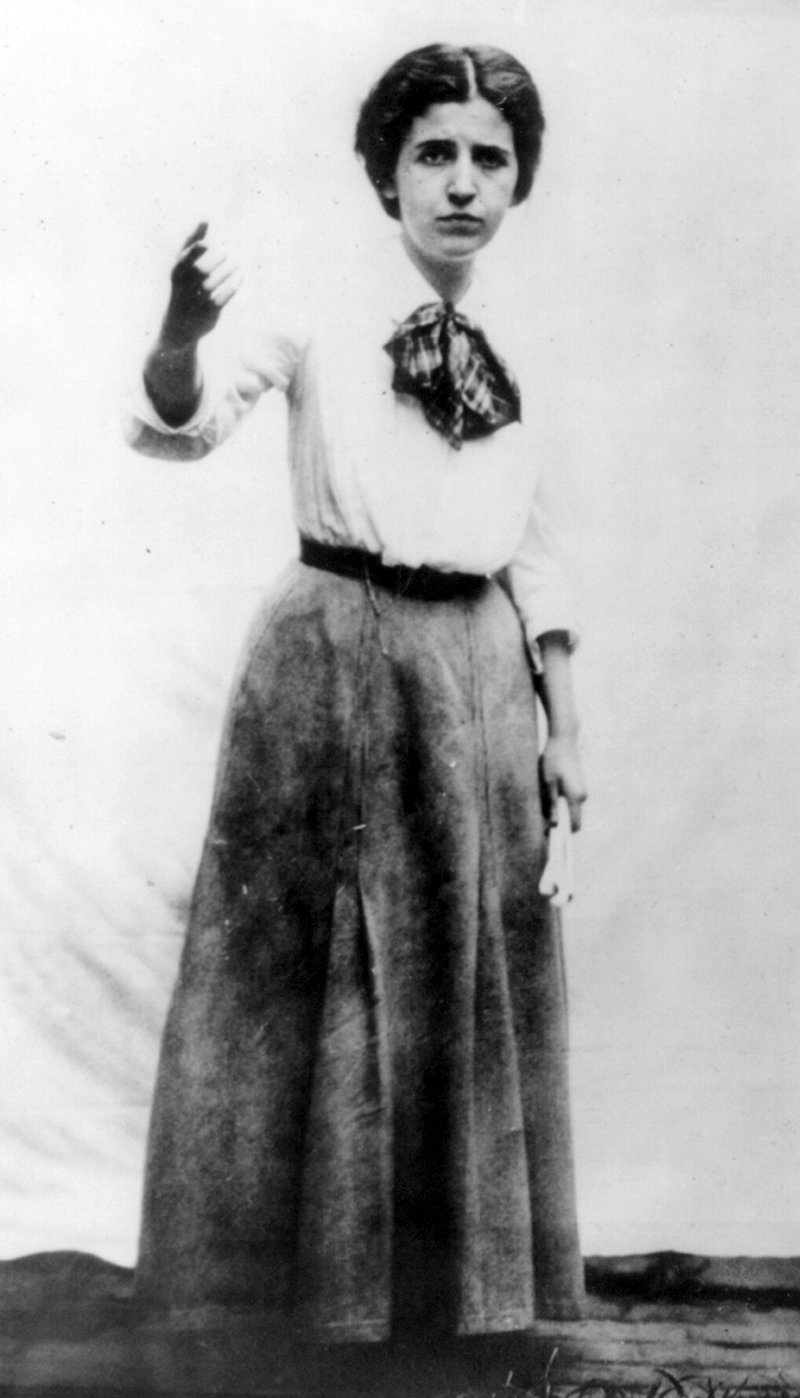
Elizabeth Gurley Flynn, firebrand soapboxer of the Industrial Workers of the World

The IWW members won a free speech fight in Missoula when, on October 8, 1909, the city council decided to let the union members speak anywhere in the community, so long as they did not impede traffic.

Elizabeth Gurley Flynn was "a striking auburn-haired 19-year-old" when she arrived in Missoula with her husband, Jack Jones in September 1909. At Higgins Avenue and West Front Street, the Wobblies set up a soapbox. On September 22, Frank Little arrived to assist. Little and Jones were arrested on September 29. A young logger and a civil engineer then spoke, and were likewise arrested. Flynn put out the word, declaring, "we need volunteers to go to jail." Wobblies poured in from the surrounding territory, flooding the jail. They sang IWW songs, and shouted Wobbly slogans.

According to Flynn, who also was arrested October 3, 1909, the jail was "a filthy, dirty hole under the firehouse stable, where all the filthy excrement of the place pours down upon the prisoners." Yet enough Wobblies submitted themselves to arrest—frequently just before dinner time—that the city was feeling the impact of the Wobbly tactic. After a night in jail, Wobblies were often offered their freedom before breakfast, but many refused to be released, instead demanding a jury trial.

The Western Montana Apple Show was set to open, and Missoula officials decided to "wave a white flag." The IWW had won the Missoula free speech fight, and all charges were dropped.

On February 7, 2011, the National Park Service officially recognized Free Speech Corner at Higgens Avenue and West Front Street, adding it to the National Register of Historic Places to commemorate the Missoula free speech fight.

=== San Diego free speech fight ===
The free speech fight in San Diego from 1912 to 1913 was among the most prominent free speech fights of the IWW. An ordinance had been passed by the San Diego Common Council which made it much more difficult for the Wobblies to engage in their soapbox orations without being swiftly arrested. The San Diego jails were soon teeming with Wobblies and others who used civil disobedience in the fight for free speech, and, even more alarmingly, contingents of vigilantes arose to fight against those in favor of free speech. The Free Speech League worked in concert with the IWW in San Diego, but, when the fight became judicial, the ordinance was upheld.

=== Sioux City, Iowa ===
Sioux City was considered a very strategic town for workers to stage free speech fights in because it was "a gateway for laborers entering and leaving summer employment in agriculture and construction in the Dakotas." Since those employment opportunities for the workers were seasonal, many of them returned to spend the winter in Sioux City, where the Wobblies attempted to provide them incentives to join their Free Speech Fight such as by educating them and helping feed them over the tough winter.

Over a thousand men were unemployed in Sioux City at the time during the winter of 1915. There had been a real push to get workers to come to Sioux City by business leaders there, but workers who arrived found that there were barely enough jobs for the local laborers. On 15 January, after facing even harsher conditions and struggling with unemployment, roughly 150 of the IWW-associated unemployed stormed the Commercial Club where many business leaders listened to them demand work and watched them take food.

In response to the direct action of the IWW, Sioux City increased enforcement of vagrancy laws and began arresting more of the IWW members engaged in the Free Speech Fights. Their goal in doing so was to attempt to drive the IWW out of town, but, unsurprisingly, they achieved the opposite. The IWW demanded free speech rights to be granted in the city. They Wobblies were filling the city's jails and forced the hand of the city officials to attempt to strike a deal with them. Ultimately, they won the fight and free speech rights were granted to workers in Sioux City.

=== Other free speech fights of the IWW ===
The IWW followed with other free speech fights in Kansas City, Missouri; Aberdeen and Wenatchee, Washington; and Fresno, California. Tar and feathers, beatings, clubbings, and forcible deportations were used in addition to incarceration. The San Diego free speech fight was unique in that the IWW did not have a specific organizing campaign at stake. The IWW won all of these free speech fights.

In early 1913, IWW members in Denver, Colorado, fought a lengthy free speech fight. Denver authorities had refused to allow the Wobblies to speak on street corners, so union members filled the jails for months. The union won the right to speak to workers, and within a year had formed two Denver branches.

Other locations of free speech fights by the IWW included Paterson, New Jersey; Duluth, Minnesota; Portland, Oregon; New Castle, Pennsylvania, and New Bedford, Massachusetts as well as Vancouver and Victoria, British Columbia.

=== The IWW's provocative free speech message ===
The IWW message was particularly unpopular with the business community. IWW members believed that the capitalist system was corrupt, could not be reformed, and could only be resisted until a better society could be built for all working people. James Walsh's streetcorner speeches were therefore frequently disrupted, particularly by the local Volunteers of America and Salvation Army Bands.

Walsh recruited volunteers to put together a small band, equipped with "a big booming bass drum," in order to get the IWW's message to listeners. The group practiced patriotic and religious tunes of the period, but the Wobblies wrote new words to the songs.

"To grab the crowd's attention," the IWW band often "hid in a doorway while one member dressed in a bowler hat and carrying a briefcase and umbrella, yelled to the crowd, 'Help! I've been robbed!' The crowd rushed over only to hear, 'I've been robbed by the capitalist system! Fellow workers ...' He then launched into a short speech, and the makeshift band stepped out of the doorway and played their songs."

=== The soapbox tradition ===
Prior to television, radio, and film becoming parts of American mass culture, public speaking was a primary medium for entertainment and information. Politicians, religious zealots, and newsboys all pitched their trade on the soapbox. Though not all street speakers were political, soapbox oration was fundamentally a political act.

With the march of time of the 20th century, police forces and city ordinances began to take away the rights of soapbox orators. As television and radio became more prominent, the very act of street speaking began to seem antiquated and, at the very least, irrelevant. Street speaking represented a threat to upper- and middle-class white Americans who feared that "inter-ethnoracial, working-class political coalitions" would achieve influence through the soap box.

This was especially true in Los Angeles, where class politics was reaching a fever pitch in the early 20th century. A multitude of political groups, such as the IWW, the Socialists, the Communist Party, and the Partido Liberal Mexicano all spoke out for Angelinos to fight for the rights of the underprivileged.

=== Socialist free speech fights: 1900–1911 ===
In the early 20th century, it was the Socialist Party that led the charge in soapbox oration. They were the first group to make effective use of the tactics of public speaking. Over the first ten years of the city, they grew enough to gain significant political clout. In Los Angeles, the party drew in skilled and semi-skilled white workers who worried about their job security. Additionally, they attempted to recruit central Angelinos from more diverse ethnic backgrounds. In this way, Free Speech Fights in Los Angeles served as the battleground between central Los Angeles workers and the rest of the city.

=== The World War I crackdown ===
In the 1910s and 1920s, street speaking in Los Angeles suffered from increasing escalation of tactics by the LAPD and city ordinances. The Wobblies became the more dominant social group after the Socialists lost power, but the IWW was unable to draw nearly as many people to their soapbox speeches.

The IWW had a major conflict with the police over public speaking in San Pedro, a harbor community. They organized with striking dockworkers, but were met with extreme repression by the police who even used violent tactics to prevent their protests from being successful. Because of the failures in San Pedro, the IWW lost power in Southern California.

== See also ==
- Anti-union violence
- Seattle's Potlatch Riot of 1913
