= Soapbox =

Platform on which one stands to make an impromptu speech

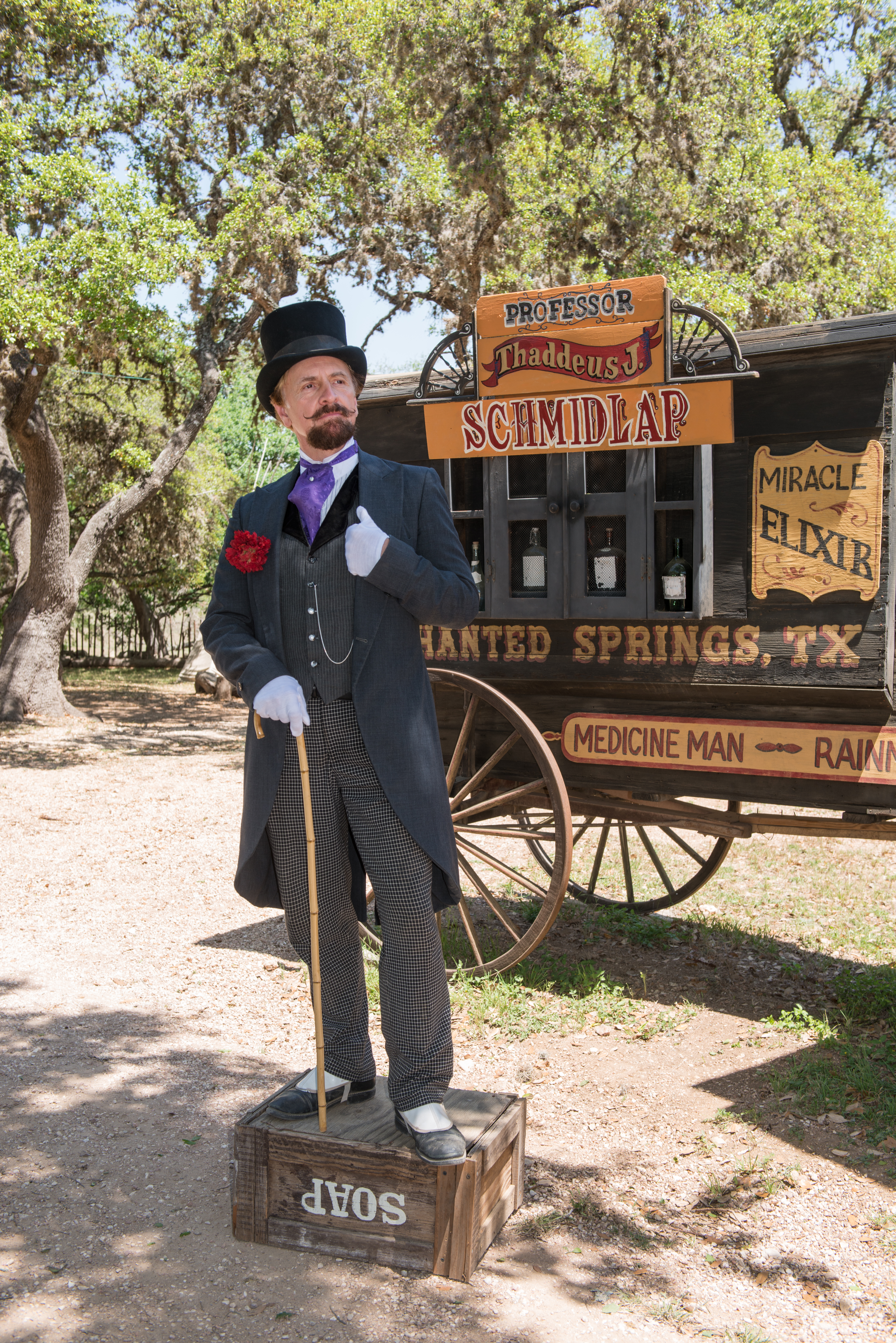
An actor portrays a snake oil salesman standing on a soapbox at a theme park

A soapbox is a raised platform on which one stands to make an impromptu speech, often about a political subject. The term originates from the days when speakers would elevate themselves by standing on a wooden crate originally used for shipment of soap, or other dry goods, from a manufacturer to a retail store.

The term is also used metaphorically to describe a person engaging in often flamboyant, impromptu, or unofficial public speaking. Hyde Park in London is known for its Sunday soapbox orators, who have assembled at its Speakers' Corner since 1872 to discuss religion, politics, and other topics. In the context of the World Wide Web, blogs can be used as soapboxes and are often used for promotional purposes.

== History ==
=== Origins of the term ===
Throughout the 19th century and into the 20th, prior to the invention of corrugated fiberboard, manufacturers used wooden crates for the shipment of wholesale merchandise to retail establishments. Discarded containers of every size, well-constructed and sturdy, were readily available in most towns. These "soapboxes" made free and easily portable temporary platforms for street corner speakers attempting to be seen and heard at improvised "outdoor meetings", to which passersby would gather to hear often provocative speeches on religious or political themes.

The decades immediately preceding World War I have been called the "Golden Age of Soapbox Oratory". Working people had little money to spend and public speakers pushing their social or political agendas provided a form of mass entertainment. Radical political parties, intent on bringing what they perceived as an emancipatory message to the working class, were particularly intent upon making use of "street meetings", with their speeches and leaflets, to advance their specific message.

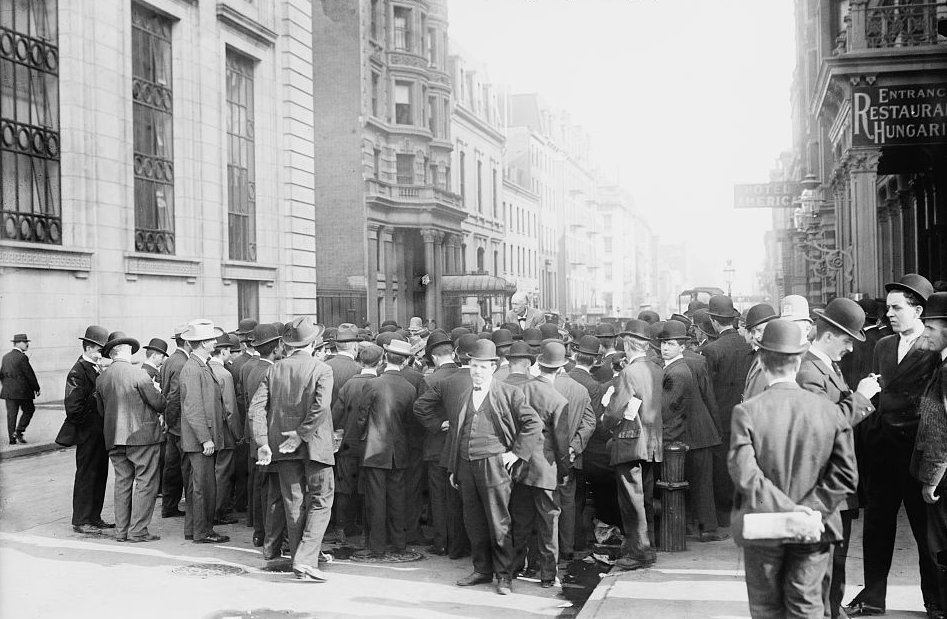
Political activists in New York City, October 1908

Street-corner oratory could also present its share of problems. Chief among these was the policy of local law enforcement authorities, who sometimes saw in radical political discourse a form of incitement to crime and violence and a threat to public order. Additionally, large street corner crowds listening to "soapboxers" would often obstruct public walkways or spill into public streets, creating inconveniences to pedestrians or vehicular traffic alike. Consequently, local authorities would often attempt to restrict public oratory through licensing or prescriptive banning.

This conflict between dedicated political or religious partisans and civil authorities intent upon the maintenance of public order made soapboxing a matter of frequent public contention. Throughout its history, soapboxing has been tied to the right to speak. From the period 1907 to approximately 1916, the Industrial Workers of the World conducted dozens of free speech fights in the United States, particularly in the West and the Northwest, in order to protect or reclaim their right to soapbox. Many prominent socialists and other radicals began their political careers in these or similar free speech fights, including Seattle newspaper publisher Hermon Titus, Socialist Party of Washington leaders Alfred Wagenknecht and L.E. Katterfeld, IWW activist Elizabeth Gurley Flynn, and prominent syndicalist William Z. Foster.

Additional problems could be presented to street corner orators from rival political groups or hecklers. A skilled and effective "soapboxer" had to be clever, having the ability to express political opinions with clarity, to have ready answers for common objections, to be able to deflect hostility with humor or satire, and to be able to face difficulty or danger with fortitude. Soapboxing proved to be what one historian has called "a hard, but nevertheless necessary, process in the development of revolutionary leaders".

=== Contemporary soapboxing ===
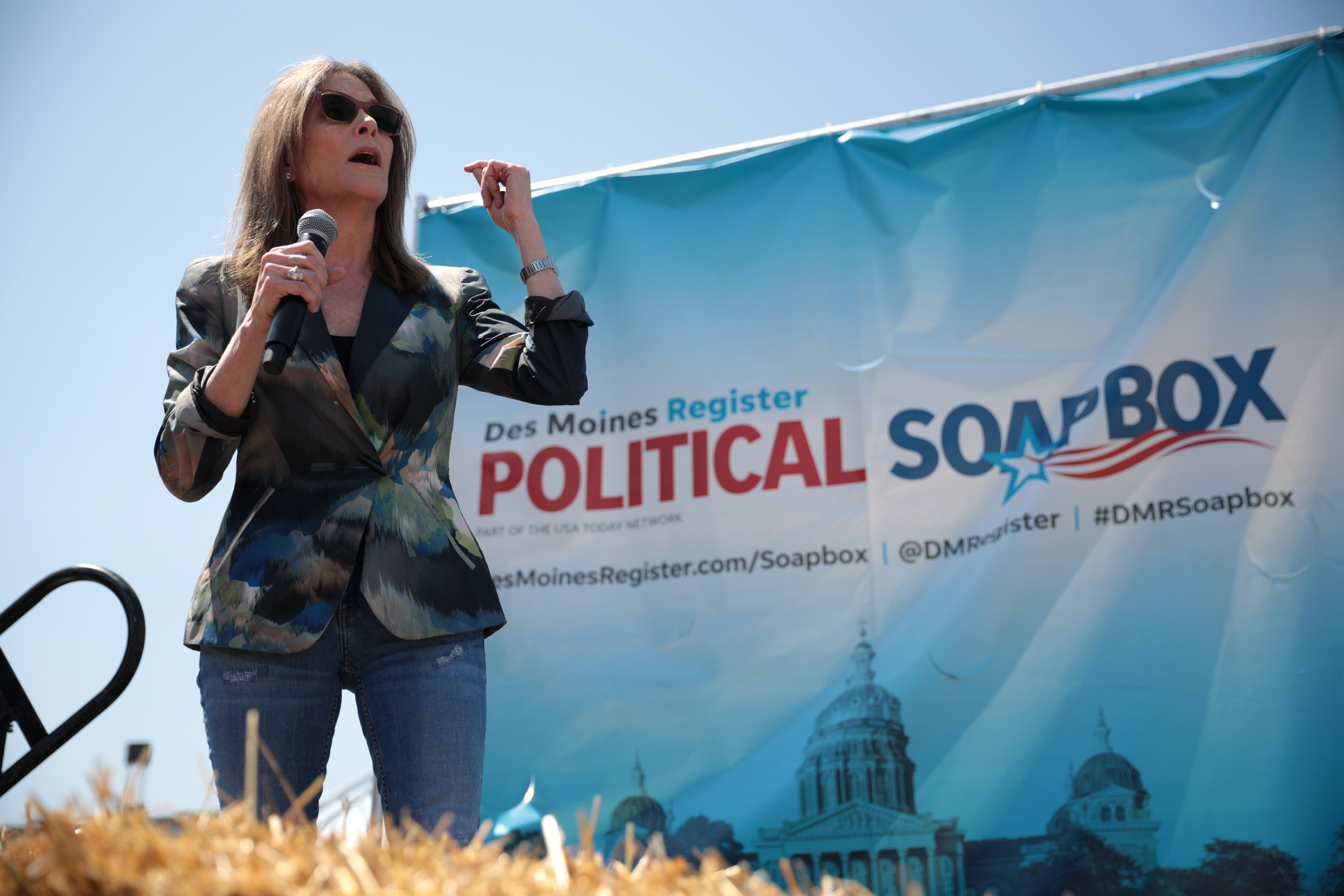
Marianne Williamson speaking with supporters at The Des Moines Register's "Political Soapbox" event

During the 1960s, a Free Speech Movement was initiated on the Berkeley, California Campus over fund-raising at an intersection and other political freedoms, and the fight eventually spread to other college campuses across the United States. As advertising professionals transitioned their craft to politics, they were reputed to be "selling candidates like soap", an expression with roots in 19th-century sales tactics to differentiate soap products.

Marvel Comics writer Stan Lee included blurbs titled "Stan's Soapbox" in some of his comic books to share his opinions on various topics with readers.
