= James H. Walsh =

American labor leader

- Occupation: Labor organizer

James H. Walsh was an American labor organizer and a prominent Wobbly.

He was the leader of the overalls brigade, a group of Wobblies who referred to themselves as "red blooded working stiffs." In 1908, they rode the rails from Portland to the Industrial Workers of the World convention in Chicago. They held propaganda meetings at each stop, singing IWW songs and selling literature to finance their trip. They traveled over 2,500 miles in their "Red Special" cattle car, ate in hobo jungles, and preached revolution in prairie towns. While at the convention, they were primarily responsible for the split that drove Daniel DeLeon out of the Chicago IWW.

In 1909, Walsh led a free speech fight in Spokane, Washington, where he was arrested on March 4, 1909.
