= Timber Wars =

Environmental podcast

- Genre: Environmentalism
- Language: English

Cast and voices
- Hosted by: Aaron Scott

Music
- Theme music composed by: Laura Gibson

Production
- Length: 30–45 minutes

Publication
- No. of seasons: 1
- No. of episodes: 7 Standard + 5 Bonus
- Original release: September 22, 2020 – May 7, 2021
- Provider: Oregon Public Broadcasting

Related
- Related shows: Floodlines; Boomtown; Costing the Earth
- Website: www.opb.org/show/timberwars/

Timber Wars is a seven-part podcast hosted by Aaron Scott and produced by Oregon Public Broadcasting.

== Background ==
The show was produced by Oregon Public Broadcasting. The show discusses the conservation movement that took place in the Pacific Northwest in the 1990s. The show discusses the complicated conflict between environmentalists and loggers that occurred during the period known as the timber wars. The show discusses the history of logging and how forests were viewed as potential tree farms. Foresters and dendrologists wanted to study and preserve old-growth forests, but were viewed negatively until the 1990s when large environmental protests began. At the same time, wildlife conservation for animals like the northern spotted owl became an issue. The show discusses a twenty-five year period of forestry and forest management. Aaron Scott is the host of the show—he grew up in Steamboat, Oregon not too far away from where the events of the show took place.

== Episodes ==
=== Introductory episode ===
Title	Running time	Original release date
"Timber Wars Trailer"	1:54	August 28, 2020

=== Season 1 ===
No.	Title	Running time	Original release date
1	"The Last Stand"	30:37	September 22, 2020
2	"The Ancient Forest"	32:37	September 22, 2020
3	"The Owl"	33:10	September 22, 2020
4	"Mill City"	33:03	September 22, 2020
5	"The Plan"	38:05	September 22, 2020
6	"The Backlash"	33:15	September 22, 2020
7	"A Way Forward"	38:26	October 3, 2020
Bonus–Episode	"Big Money Bought the Forest"	35:33	November 17, 2020
Guest–Episode	"Grouse"	19:02	November 21, 2020
This bonus episode is from the podcast called "Grouse"
Guest–Episode	"How to Save a Planet"	60:27	June 1, 2021
This bonus episode is from the podcast called "How to Save a Planet"
Bonus–Episode	"Wildfire"	43:47	January 28, 2021
Bonus–Episode	"The Woman Who Would Talk to Trees"	59:08	May 28, 2021
This episode features an interview with Suzanne Simard about the Social World of Trees

== Reception ==
Nicholas Kristof of The New York Times commented on the show saying that "Listeners are left with both an appreciation of the magnificence of old growth forests and the toll paid by logging communities when those forests were protected. Environmentalists and loggers don't agree on much, but I think they will concur that 'Timber Wars' is fair and brilliant journalism."

=== Awards ===
Award	Date	Category	Result	Ref.
National Headliner Awards	2021	Narrative Podcast	1	
MIT Knight Science Journalism Program's Victor K. McElheny Award	2021	Local and Regional Science Journalism for Episode 1: The Last Stand and Episode 2: The Ancient Forest	Won	
Society of Professional Journalism Awards	2021	Audio: Series—Large Newsroom Division	1	
Society of Professional Journalism Awards	2021	Audio: Feature, Hard News—Large Newsroom Division for Episode 3: The Owl	1	
Scripps Howard Awards	2020	Excellence in Environmental Reporting	Finalist	
