= Industrial Union Bulletin =

Newspaper published by the Industrial Workers of the World

- "Labor is Entitled to All It Produces"
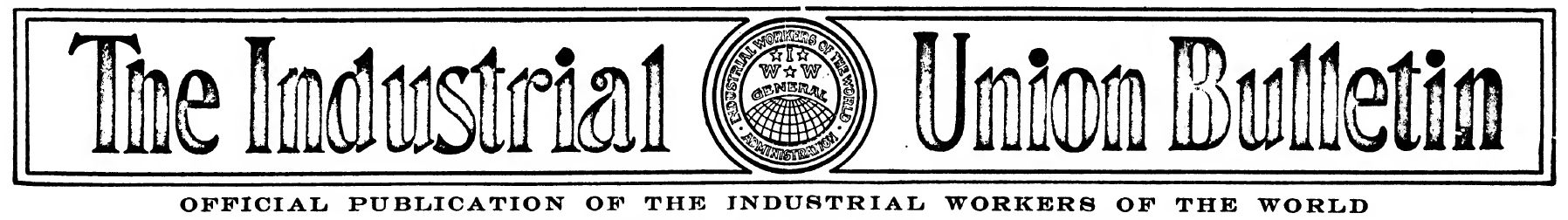
- Type: Weekly newspaper
- Format: Broadsheet
- Publisher: Industrial Workers of the World
- Founded: 1907
- Political alignment: Industrial unionism
- Language: English
- Ceased publication: 1909
- City: Chicago
- Country: United States
- Circulation: 11,500
- Free online archives: Link

The Industrial Union Bulletin was a newspaper published by the Industrial Workers of the World (IWW), a labor union.

== History ==
During a 1906 split of the IWW into two groups, each claiming legitimacy as the real IWW, one group headed by former President Charles O. Sherman took possession of the union's office, and of the resources to continue publishing the organization's official newspaper, the Industrial Worker. The office of president had just been abolished at the 1906 convention. The other group, headed by IWW Secretary Treasurer William Trautmann, Vincent St. John, and Daniel DeLeon, head of the Socialist Labor Party, published through a different IWW publication called the Industrial Union Bulletin.

A.S. Edwards was elected editor of the Bulletin in 1906. The Trautmann-St. John-DeLeon faction eventually prevailed in a lawsuit over the Sherman faction.

During the economic panic of 1907, the Industrial Union Bulletin went from a weekly publication to every two weeks, and for a time publication was suspended. The last issue of the Industrial Union Bulletin was published March 6, 1909. A few days later, on March 18, the Industrial Worker, version II, No. 1, Vol. 1 was published in Spokane, Washington.

== See also ==
- Solidarity
