= Solidarity (Industrial Workers of the World) =

Newspaper published by the Industrial Workers of the World

Solidarity was a newspaper published by the Industrial Workers of the World from 1909 to 1917. It was the official periodical of the organization in its early years. It was born as part of the McKees Rocks strike in 1909, initially by the IWW's Pittsburgh-New Castle Industrial Council. During the IWW's involvement in the local steel industry in New Castle and in Butler, Pennsylvania, the entire editorial and production staff of Solidarity was jailed.

Over the years, Solidarity had many different editors. Publication was carried on in New Castle, Pennsylvania. By April 1913, publication had moved to Cleveland, Ohio, where it remained until March 3, 1917. The newspaper began publishing in Chicago, Illinois, on March 10, 1917.

The first issue of Solidarity was published on December 18, 1909, and publication lasted until March 18, 1917. In November, 1917, publication of Solidarity was suspended and replaced by Defense News Bulletin, which chronicled the IWW's legal campaign to defend union members and leaders who had been arrested under the government's anti-syndicalism campaign. Defense News Bulletin continued publication until July 1918.

== Editors ==
The following members of the Industrial Workers of the World were editors of Solidarity:

- A.M. Stirton
- H.A. Goff
- Ben H. Williams (1909–March 3, 1917)
- Ralph Chaplin (March 10, 1917–)
- J. W. Wilson (served as acting editor from October 6, 1917, after Chaplin was arrested in IWW raids in Chicago)
- P.J. Welinder
- John Sandgren

== See also ==
- Industrial Worker
- Industrial Union Bulletin
