= Industrial Worker =

Magazine of the Industrial Workers of the World

- "The Voice of Revolutionary Industrial Unionism"
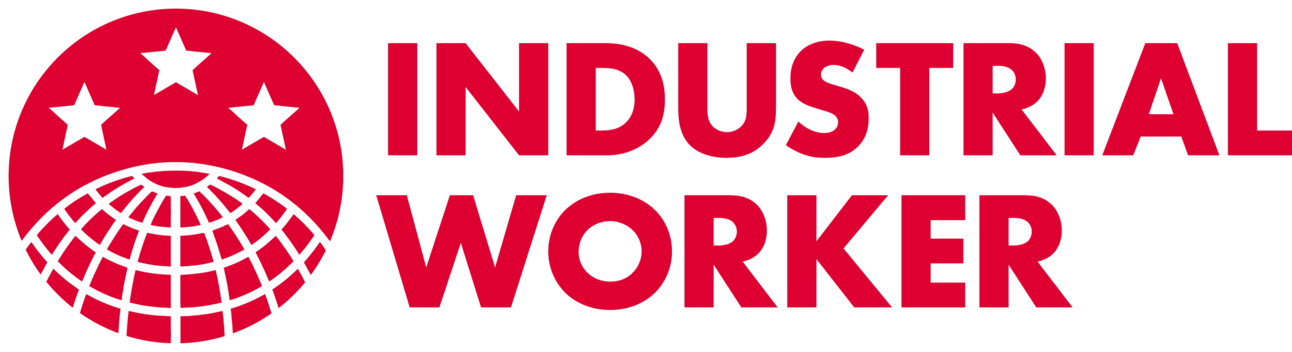

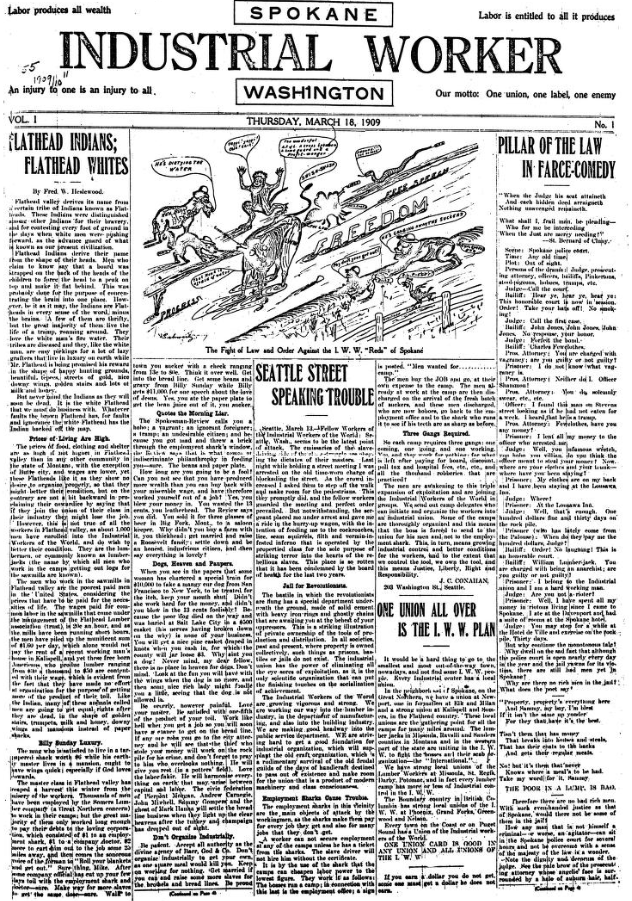
- Front page of March 18, 1909, issue
- Format: Quarterly Magazine
- Publisher: Industrial Workers of the World
- Editor: The IW Editorial Committee
- Launched: January 1906; 120 years ago
- Political alignment: Revolutionary industrial unionism
- City: Chicago
- Country: United States
- ISSN: 0019-8870
- Website: industrialworker.org

The Industrial Worker, "the voice of revolutionary industrial unionism", is the magazine of the Industrial Workers of the World (IWW, a.k.a., "Wobblies"). It is now released quarterly. The publication was printed and edited by union labor, and frequently distributed at radical bookstores, demonstrations, strikes, and labor rallies. It covers industrial conditions, strikes, workplace organizing experiences, and features on labor history. It used to be released as a newspaper.

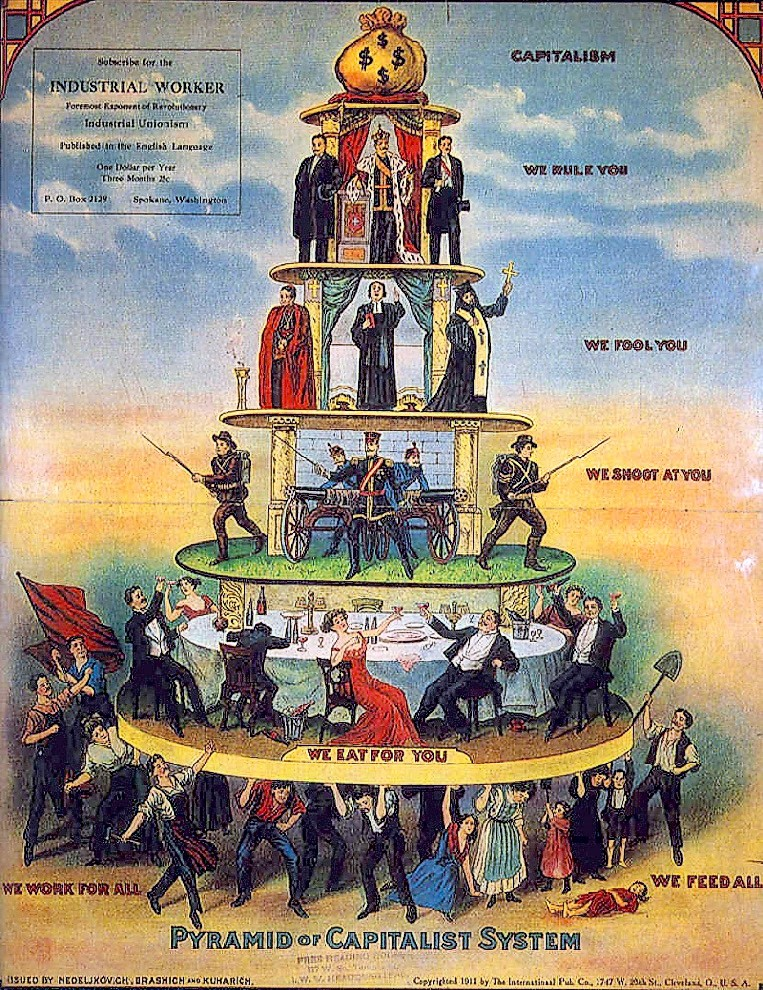
Famous 1911 Industrial Worker illustration, "Pyramid of Capitalist System"

The newspaper was first printed in journal format in Joliet, Illinois, in January 1906, incorporating The Voice of Labor (the newspaper from the former American Labor Union which had joined the IWW), and International Metal Worker. It was edited by A. S. Edwards, and early contributors included Eugene V. Debs, Jack London, Daniel DeLeon, Bill Haywood, and James H. Walsh. It also included poetry by Covington Hall. When the group led by ousted President Charles O. Sherman retained physical control over the paper, after the union's 1906 convention, and continued publication under that name for a few months (before giving up the ghost), the IWW then issued the Industrial Union Bulletin for several years. A.S. Edwards was elected editor of the Bulletin in 1906.

The second series of the Industrial Worker started in 1909 in Spokane, Washington. This series has continues, with one interruption – during 1913–1916. In the early years, it was printed weekly and mainly circulated west of the Mississippi. While the IWW's "Official Eastern Organ" was Solidarity, published in New Castle, Pennsylvania, and later, Cleveland, which continued until it merged with the Industrial Worker in Chicago in the 1930s.

The Spokane paper was the birthplace of the comic strip character Mr. Block, later commemorated in a Joe Hill song. The Industrial Worker usually ran four pages, with an annual eight page May Day issue, reflecting on gains of the labor movement in the previous year. Circulation fell off due to the repression of the IWW during and after the First World War, reflecting a decline in the influence of radical unionism more generally.

Presently, the IW editor is decided every two years, via an IWW referendum. Recent editors have included Jon Bekken, Peter Moore, Diane Krauthamer, and Roberta McNair. Currently, the publication is edited by a committee.

Issues of the Industrial Worker are often available on microfilm at university libraries and other research oriented facilities.

== See also ==
- Fred W. Thompson, longtime Wobbly and IW editor
- Solidarity
