= List of songs by Joe Hill =

Many of Joe Hill's songs were published in the Industrial Workers of the World's Little Red Songbook, such as this 1916 edition dedicated to him.

Joe Hill was a Swedish-American songwriter and labor organizer who worked with the Industrial Workers of the World (IWW), an anarcho-syndicalist labor union from 1910 until his death. He migrated to the United States in 1902 and lived as a transient worker across North America. He was executed in Salt Lake City in 1915 after a controversial murder trial which convicted him on circumstantial evidence. In conjunction with the popularity of his songs, he became a folk hero among the American labor and socialist movements.

Twenty-four of Hill's songs were published in IWW material, including 20 in the Little Red Songbook, officially titled IWW Songs. The songbook was published in various editions from 1909 onward, featuring songs intended to "fan the flames of discontent". Hill was the largest individual contributor for the songbook. Hill's songs were generally distributed as lyrics alone, to be sung to the tunes of widely-known hymns, popular songs, and show tunes. However, "Workers of the World, Awaken!" and "The Rebel Girl" were written to original melodies. Hill saw his music as a means to build class consciousness and win over workers that may otherwise be uninterested in IWW literature. The songs were often humorous and sharply critical of capitalist society, but often contained an inspiring message in their final verse. As Hill frequently improvised songs, many were never written down. Fragments of three unpublished songs for the 1912 Canadian Northern Railroad strike were recorded in an interview with a former IWW organizer in 1967. Two non-political love songs were found on Hill during his arrest, while a third was found in the archives of the Swedish Ministry for Foreign Affairs.

The songs gained popularity across the United States during the early 1910s, widely sung at labor actions and hobo camps. Several of his songs, such as "There Is Power in a Union" and "The Preacher and the Slave" remain popular among American labor movements, described by biographer Franklin Rosemont as "labor and revolutionary standards". His songs have been covered by a wide variety of later musicians.

== List ==
List of songs by Joe Hill
Name	First publication	Tune	Notes	Ref.
"The Preacher and the Slave"	Spokane IWW songbook, July 1911	"In the Sweet By-and-By" (1868)	Also known as "Long Haired Preachers", it mocks the Salvation Army. It was initially credited to F. B. Brechler, possibly a pen name, before it was credited to Hill in the 5th edition of IWW Songs. It introduced the idiom "pie in the sky".	
"Casey Jones—the Union Scab"	Spokane IWW songbook, July 1912	"The Ballad of Casey Jones" (1909)	Initially written in 1911 and sold on a card to support the Southern Pacific Railroad strike fund. It mocks strikebreakers—also known derisively as "scabs".	
"Everybody's Joining It"	Spokane IWW songbook, July 1912	"Everybody's Doing It" (1911)	Advertises the IWW and encourages workers to join	
"Where the Fraser River Flows"	Spokane IWW songbook, July 1912	"Where the Shannon River Flows" (1905)	Written in early 1912 in support of a Canadian Northern Railway strike. Initially published as "Where the Frazer River Flows".	
"Coffee An'"	Spokane IWW songbook, July 1912	"Count Your Blessings" (1897)	Republished in the 17th edition of IWW Songs as "Count Your Workers—Count Them!" It describes a worker who is sent to a terrible job by an employment agency.	
"John Golden and the Lawrence Strike"	Spokane IWW songbook, July 1912	"A Little Talk With Jesus" (c. 1900)	Written in support of the 1912 Lawrence textile strike, criticizing American Federation of Labor president John Golden for attempting to negotiate a less favorable settlement than what was demanded.	
"Mr. Block"	Industrial Worker, January 23, 1913	"It Looks to Me Like a Big Time Tonight" (1908)	Based on an eponymous IWW comic strip character, a comedic and unlucky worker who blindly supports capitalism and authority. It was first included in the 5th edition of the IWW Songbook in March 1913.	
"Scissor Bill"	Industrial Worker, February 19, 1913	"Steamboat Bill" (1910)	Mocks "scissorbills", an IWW term for workers who impede their own advancement through their hatred. It was first included in the 5th edition of the IWW Songbook in March 1913. Mocking racist workers, it contains various racial slurs and epithets; these were removed from some later editions of the songbook.	
"We Will Sing One Song"	Industrial Worker, March 6, 1913	"My Old Kentucky Home" (1853)	Describes the shared struggle of all workers against capitalism and supports the One Big Union. It was later republished in the 5th edition of the IWW Songbook in March 1913.	
"Should I Ever Be A Soldier"	IWW Songs, 5th ed., March 1913	"Colleen Bawn" (1906)	Criticizes militarism and military spending. It was also published in the April 3, 1913 edition of the Industrial Worker.	
"What We Want"	IWW Songs, 5th ed., March 1913	"Rainbow" (1908)	Outlines the goals of the labor movement to liberate all workers. It was also published in the March 27, 1913 edition of the Industrial Worker.	
"Stung Right"	IWW Songs, 5th ed., March 1913	"Sunlight, Sunlight" (1897)	Criticizes the United States Navy and its poor working conditions	
"There Is Power in a Union"	IWW Songs, 5th ed., March 1913	"There is Power in the Blood" (1899)	Calls on workers to join the IWW to escape wage slavery	
"The White Slave"	IWW Songs, 5th ed., March 1913	"Meet Me Tonight in Dreamland" (1909)	Bemoans poor working conditions which lead women into prostitution	
"The Tramp"	IWW Songs, 5th ed., March 1913	"Tramp! Tramp! Tramp!" (1864)	Tells the story of a tramp (homeless migrant) who is repeatedly rejected while looking for work. The final verse, where the devil throws the tramp out of hell, was removed from some later versions.	
"Nearer My Job to Thee"	IWW Songs, 5th ed., March 1913	"Nearer, My God, to Thee" (1841)	Details the story of a worker who is scammed and sent out to the wilderness to a nonexistent workplace by a job agency.	
"Down in the Old Dark Mill"	IWW Songs, 5th ed., March 1913	"Down by the Old Mill Stream" (1910)	Tells a love story between two young workers which ends when the protagonist breaks his arm in a workplace accident and becomes homeless.	
"The Girl Question"	IWW Songs, 5th ed., March 1913	"Tell Mother I'll Be There" (1898)	Tells of a girl who is repeatedly told to find a rich lover while trying to find food and shelter, before finding safety in the IWW.	
"The Old Toiler's Message"	Seattle IWW songbook, August 1913	"Silver Threads Among the Gold" (1873)	Bemoans old workers being left in poverty when they are no longer able to work	
"Come and Take A Joy-Ride in my Aeroplane"	Reprinted by the The Salt Lake Tribune in 1914	Original melody	One of three unpublished love songs written by Hill. The lyrics were found by police upon his 1914 arrest.	
"Oh, Please Let Me Dance This Waltz With You"	Reprinted by the The Salt Lake Tribune in 1914	Original melody	One of three unpublished love songs written by Hill. The lyrics were found by police upon his 1914 arrest.	
"Workers of the World, Awaken!"	Solidarity, September 1914	Original melody	Likely the first of Joe Hill's songs to be written while imprisoned, it calls for the workers of the world to rise up and overthrow capitalism. Was later published as sheet music and included in the 9th edition of the IWW songbook in March 1916.	
"Ta-ra-ra Boom-de-ay"	IWW Songs, 9th ed., March 1916	"Ta-ra-ra Boom-de-ay" (1891)	Likely written prior to Hill's arrest, it advocates sabotage as a means to fight poor working conditions.	
"Don't Take My Papa Away From Me"	IWW Songs, 9th ed., March 1916	Original melody	Written the day before Hill's execution, it portrays the fears of a young girl whose father is sent off to fight in World War I and dies in battle.	
"The Rebel Girl"	IWW Songs, 9th ed., March 1916	Original melody	Written in honor of IWW organizer Elizabeth Gurley Flynn, it praises the resolve of female labor activists and calls for more to join the union.	
"It's A Long Way Down to the Soup Line"	IWW Songs, 13th ed., September 1917	"It's a Long Way to Tipperary" (1912)	Commissioned by IWW organizer Sam Murray while Hill was imprisoned, it describes a worker who organizes for lower work hours after he loses his job. Murray sent Hill the sheet music, as he was unfamiliar with the original song.	
"My Dreamland Girl"	Reprinted in Gibbs M. Smith's 1969 biography Joe Hill	Original melody	One of three unpublished love songs written by Hill. The lyrics were found in the archives of the Swedish Ministry of Foreign Affairs. As it was found printed on a small card, it was likely produced for sale.	
"We Won't Build No More Railroads for Overalls and Snuff"	Unpublished	"The Wearing of the Green" (1841)	It was one of three songs Hill wrote in support of the 1912 Canadian Northern Railway strike. Only partial lyrics were recorded.	
"Skookum Ryan the Walking Boss"	Unpublished	Unknown	It was one of three songs Hill wrote in support of the 1912 Canadian Northern Railway strike, and said to be very popular among the strikers. Only one of its five or six stanzas was recorded.	
"The Mucker's Dream"	Unpublished	"The Wearing of the Green" (1841)	Also recorded as "Martin Welch and Stuart", it was one of three songs Hill wrote in support of the 1912 Canadian Northern Railway strike. Only partial lyrics were recorded.	
"A Trip to Honolulu"	Unpublished	Original melody	Rediscovered in 2001, it is unique among the known Hill songs to consist of sheet music but no lyrics.	
