= Joe Hill's ashes =

Remains of American activist and songwriter

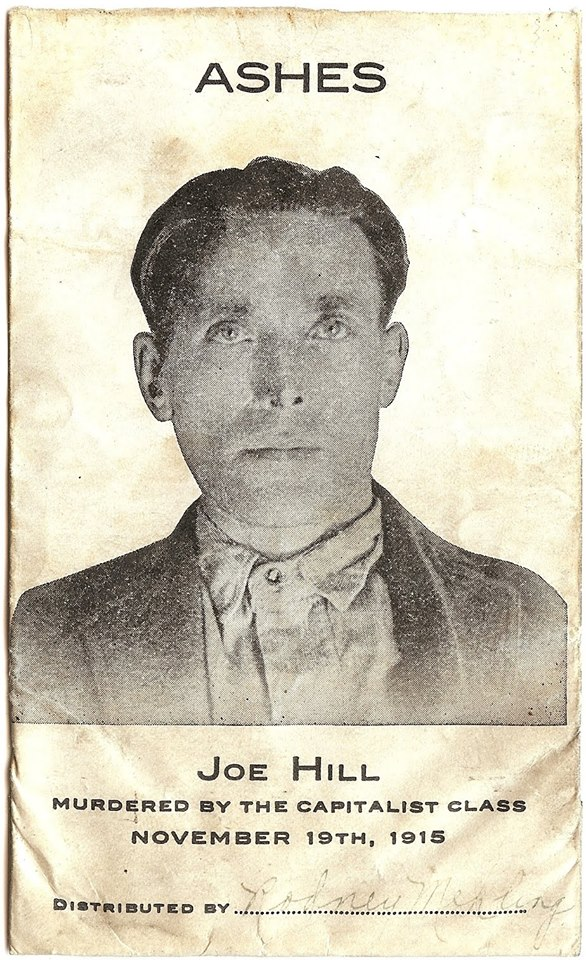
One of hundreds of packets of Hill's ashes distributed to IWW chapters in 1916 and 1917.

Joe Hill was a Swedish-American labor activist, poet, and songwriter who organized with the Industrial Workers of the World (IWW), a militant anti-capitalist labor union, and wrote various folk songs in support of radical causes. He was convicted of murder in Salt Lake City in 1914, after a controversial trial marked by accusations that he was framed. He was executed on November 19, 1915. His body was transported to Chicago and cremated after funeral services in both Utah and Illinois. The following year, the IWW gave packets containing some of Hill's ashes to 150 international delegates from across Europe, Asia, Australia, New Zealand, South America, and South Africa, calling on them to spread the ashes in their home countries, in accordance with his last wishes. 450 other packets were mailed to IWW chapters in every state except Utah.

Although some chapters were able to hold ceremonies scattering his ashes in 1917, the IWW fell under a federal crackdown following the United States' entry into World War I. Security officials seized most of the remaining ashes. An envelope reported to contain 2 ounces (57 g) of his ashes was seized by officials in Chicago and held by the Bureau of Investigation, before being transferred to the National Archives in 1944. This envelope was rediscovered in the 1980s and returned to a group of IWW delegates in 1988. The IWW, now significantly reduced in size, scattered small portions of the ashes during various events across the United States during the 1980s and 1990s. On the suggestion of radical activist Abbie Hoffman, the British folk musician Billy Bragg consumed some of the ashes in honor of Hill, later giving an additional packet to American folk singer Otis Gibbs to do the same.

== Background ==
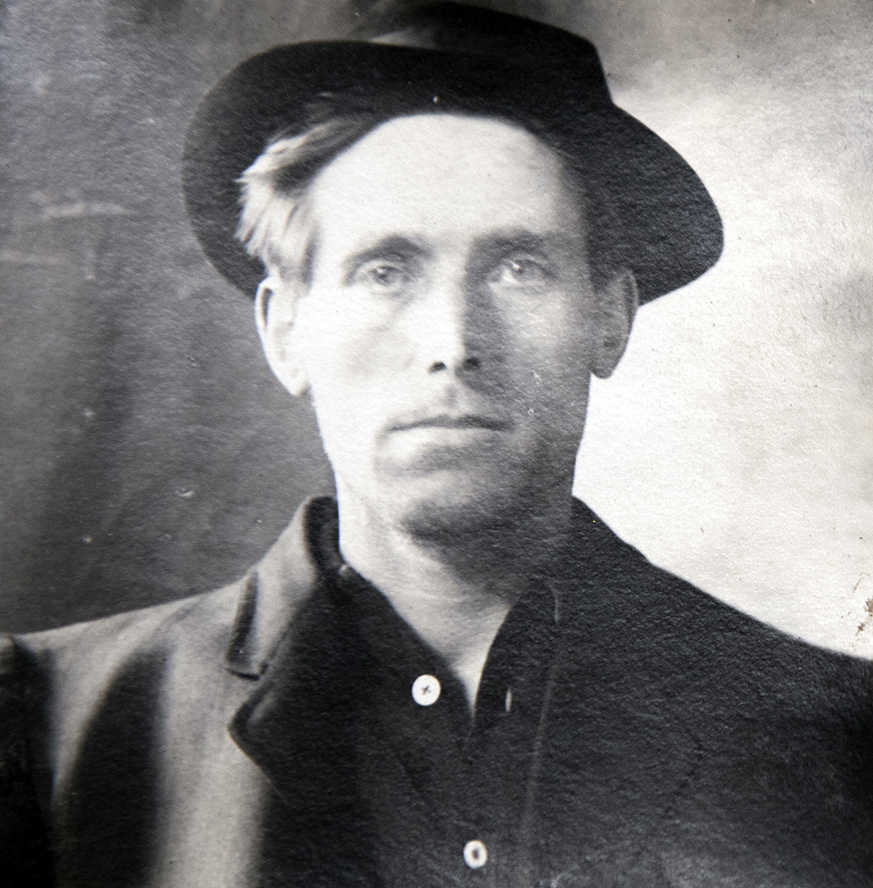
Joe Hill in 1914

Joe Hill was a Swedish-American songwriter and labor organizer who worked with the Industrial Workers of the World (IWW), an anarcho-syndicalist labor union, from 1910 until his death. Born in Gävle in 1879, he migrated to the United States in 1902 and lived as a transient worker across North America. Seeking to build class consciousness among workers, he wrote various folk songs which attacked and parodied capitalism. These gained widespread popularity among IWW members, and labor activists more generally. Two of his songs, "There Is Power in a Union" and "The Preacher and the Slave", gained exceptional and enduring popularity; writer Franklin Rosemont described them as "labor and revolutionary standards".

=== Execution and funeral ===
On January 10, 1914, Salt Lake City grocer and former policeman John Morrison and his son Arling were shot and killed by unknown assailants. On the same night, Hill entered a doctor's office in Salt Lake with a bullet wound, claiming he had been shot during a fight over a "woman's honor". Hill was later arrested after the doctor or his associate reported him to the police. After a controversial trial, Hill was convicted for the murder on largely circumstantial evidence, sparking claims that he had been framed for the crime, possibly for his association with the IWW. In conjunction with the popularity of his songs, Hill became a folk hero among the American labor and socialist movements. Although Hill's defense team was able to delay his execution, their appeal case and efforts to have his sentence commuted were unsuccessful.

On November 18, 1915, Hill wrote his last will in the format of a poem, declaring "My body? —Oh!— If I could choose, I would to ashes it reduce, And let the merry breezes blow, My dust to where some flowers grow". The following day, he was executed by firing squad at Sugar House Prison. By the evening, his body was stored at a small mortuary in Salt Lake. Even after his body was moved from the main viewing room to the funeral chapel, crowds of thousands lined up to see his body over the following days. With no larger venue available, his funeral was held at the chapter by the Salt Lake City IWW local on the 21st, with about 200 mourners inside and thousands outside. Mourners gave speeches, read poems, and sang radical songs.

According to his wishes not to be "caught dead in Utah", Hill's casket was loaded on a train to Chicago. It arrived two days later, where IWW leader Bill Haywood and a group of local members took the body to a small chapel. On November 25, Thanksgiving, speeches and songs were performed at the West Side Auditorium in his honor, before a local IWW local led a mile-long funeral procession of Hill's casket to a nearby railway station, singing Hill's songs to a crowd of around 30,000 spectators. The casket was taken to the Chicago Graceland Cemetery, where IWW members gave eulogies in various languages. As the crematorium was closed for Thanksgiving, Hill's body was cremated the following day.

== Distribution ==
On November 19, 1916, the first anniversary of Hill's execution, the IWW held its annual convention at the West Side Auditorium in Chicago. Haywood distributed envelopes with the ashes among the 150 international delegates, who were told to scatter the ashes in a ceremony in their home country. They were distributed to Australia, New Zealand, each country in South America, South Africa, and parts of Europe and Asia. About 450 other packets were mailed to IWW locals in every state—except, in accordance to his wishes, Utah. Each envelope contained an identical set of instructions calling on the recipient to scatter the ashes and record it via a letter to the IWW headquarters.

Fellow Worker:

In compliance with the last will of Joe Hill, his body was cremated at Graceland Cemetery, Chicago, Illinois, Nov. 26, 1915. It was his request that his ashes be distributed. This package has been confined to your care for the fulfillment of this last will. You will kindly address a letter to Wm. D. Haywood, Room 307, 164 W. Washington St., Chicago, 111., telling the circumstances and where the ashes were distributed.

We will never forget,
Joe Hill Memorial Committee

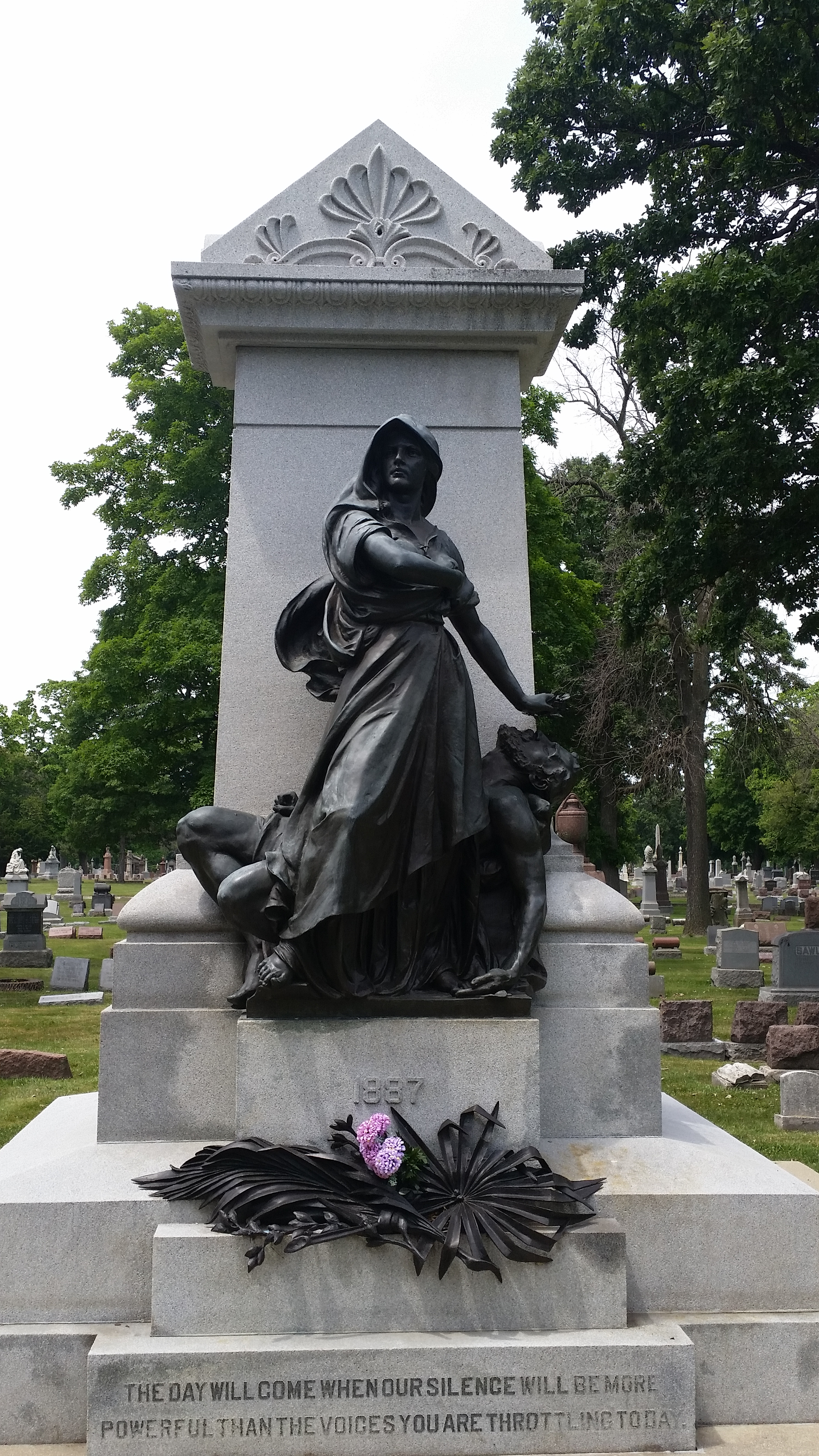
Some of Hill's ashes were scattered on the Haymarket Martyrs' Monument in Forest Park, Illinois.

In Forest Park, Illinois, a packet of Hill's ashes were scattered at the Haymarket Martyrs' Monument in Forest Home Cemetery, in honor of four trade unionists who were executed in 1886. The IWW and the Socialist Party of San Jose, California, released three balloons carrying fragments of his ashes in early 1917. Some of his ashes were scattered on the steps of a schoolhouse in Duluth, Minnesota, in February 1917, while that March, the Cleveland IWW conducted an elaborate ceremony to scatter them along the shore of Lake Erie. To mark International Workers' Day in 1917, the Seattle IWW scattered some of his ashes atop the graves of three IWW members killed in the 1916 Everett massacre. In 1918, journalist and communist activist John Reed, writing for The Liberator, recalled meeting "men carrying next their hearts, in the pocket of their working-clothes, little bottles with some of Joe Hill’s ashes in them".

In 1916 and 1917, the IWW and the American labor movement more generally came under attack nationally by police, federal security forces, and private militia as the United States cracked down on radical movements following its entrance into World War I. On September 5, 1917, a team of law enforcement from various federal, local, and private agencies raided the IWW headquarters in Chicago, seizing five tons of material. In addition to documents and furniture, the remaining stockpile of envelopes containing Hill's ashes was seized.

The IWW in Sydney, Australia, was raided by police before it was able to scatter the ashes. The envelope was seized and held at the Darlinghurst Police Station, and was later destroyed during a fire. In 1919, organizer George Carey discovered a packet of the ashes inside an abandoned IWW hall in Toledo, Ohio. For many years, Carey attempted to deliver the packet to the union's leadership, but was unable to find a contact. In June 1950, he instead scattered the ashes in his yard.

== Rediscovery and later commemorations ==
An envelope reported to contain 2 ounces (57 g) of Hill's ashes, addressed to a man named Charles Gepford without established links to the IWW, was seized by a postmaster in Chicago. One account states that they were discovered after the envelope was "accidentally mutilated" by a post office machine; this may have been an attempt to disguise a seizure of the letter. Hill's ashes were likely considered to have propaganda value, and might have been seized under the powers of the Espionage Act of 1917. They was later given to the Bureau of Investigation, which later became the Federal Bureau of Investigation. In 1944, the ashes were transferred to the National Archives and Records Administration.

A Utah historian named Lori Taylor became aware of the ashes during research in the 1980s. In 1988, the United Auto Workers members' magazine reported on the ashes. The IWW—reduced to a smaller organization of about 1,000 members—began negotiations with the National Archives for the envelope, with IWW member and economics professor Frederic Sterling Lee petitioning for their return. In a ceremony at the National Archives in November 1988, archivist Trudy Peterson handed a container of the ashes to a group of IWW delegates, including folk singer Utah Phillips.

After obtaining them later that year, the union brought the ashes to their Chicago offices, where they were kept in a small jar (likened to a cold cream container) within a safe. The union formed a "Joe Hill Committee" among its membership to solicit suggestions on memorials to perform with the ashes. Among the received suggestions, some advocated donating the ashes to a labor history museum or auctioning them for a strike fund; more comedic proposals included covertly scattering the ashes inside the White House. The ashes were later moved to a clay urn inscribed with Hill's call "Don't mourn, Organize".

Many small portions of the remaining ashes were split and sent to several different IWW locals for commemorations, such as, in 1989, on a memorial in Lafayette, Colorado to the striking miners killed in the 1927 Columbine Mine massacre. In a 1992 Veterans Day celebration at a farm in Chehalis, Washington, a group of activists and IWW organizers scattered the ashes in honor of the 1919 Centralia Massacre, a battle between the IWW and the American Legion. In the 1990s, the IWW moved the remaining ashes to its new headquarters in San Francisco, and continued to scatter small fragments of them at union ceremonies and memorials—including one instance in Utah.

=== Consumption ===
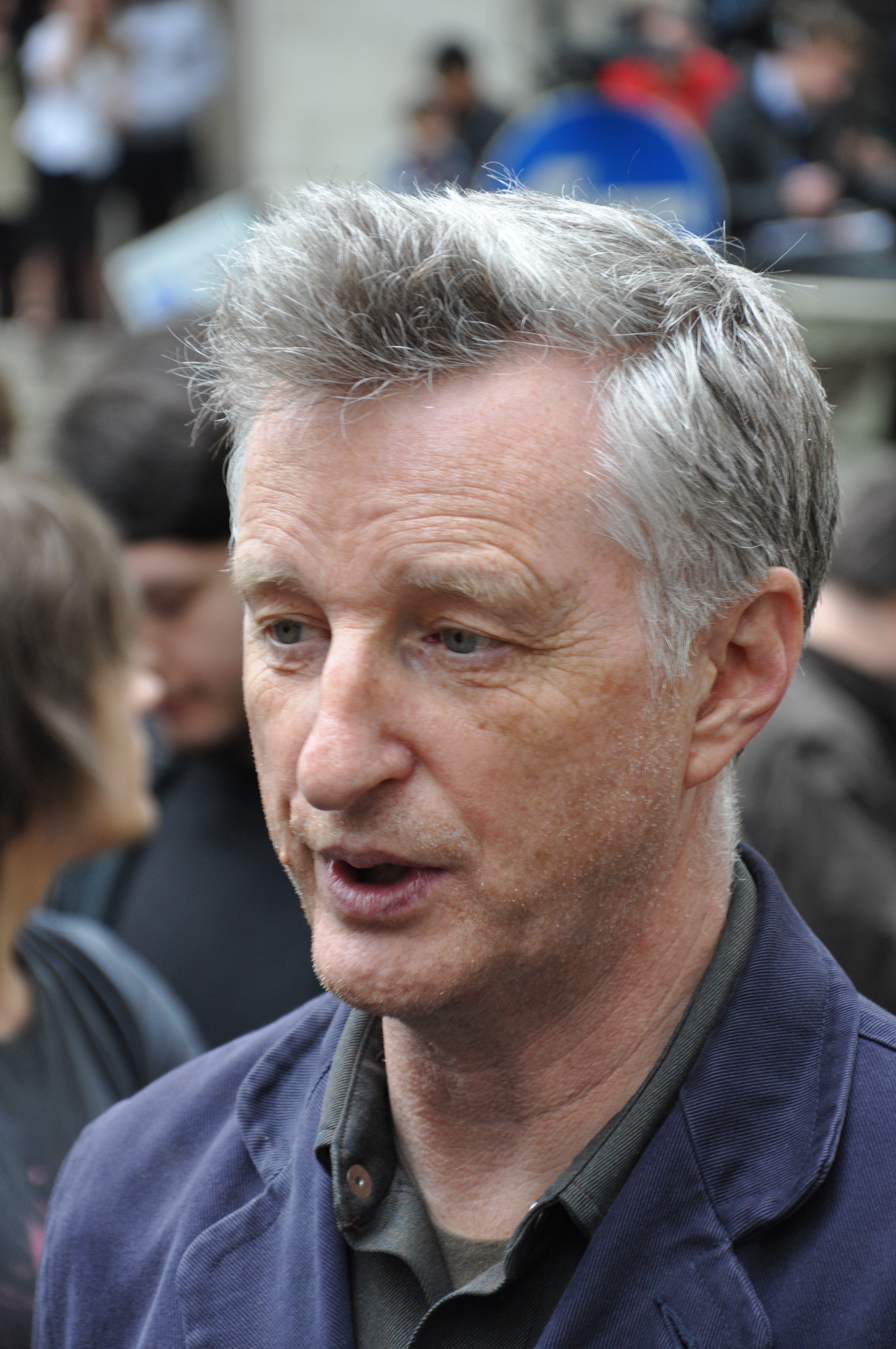
Billy Bragg

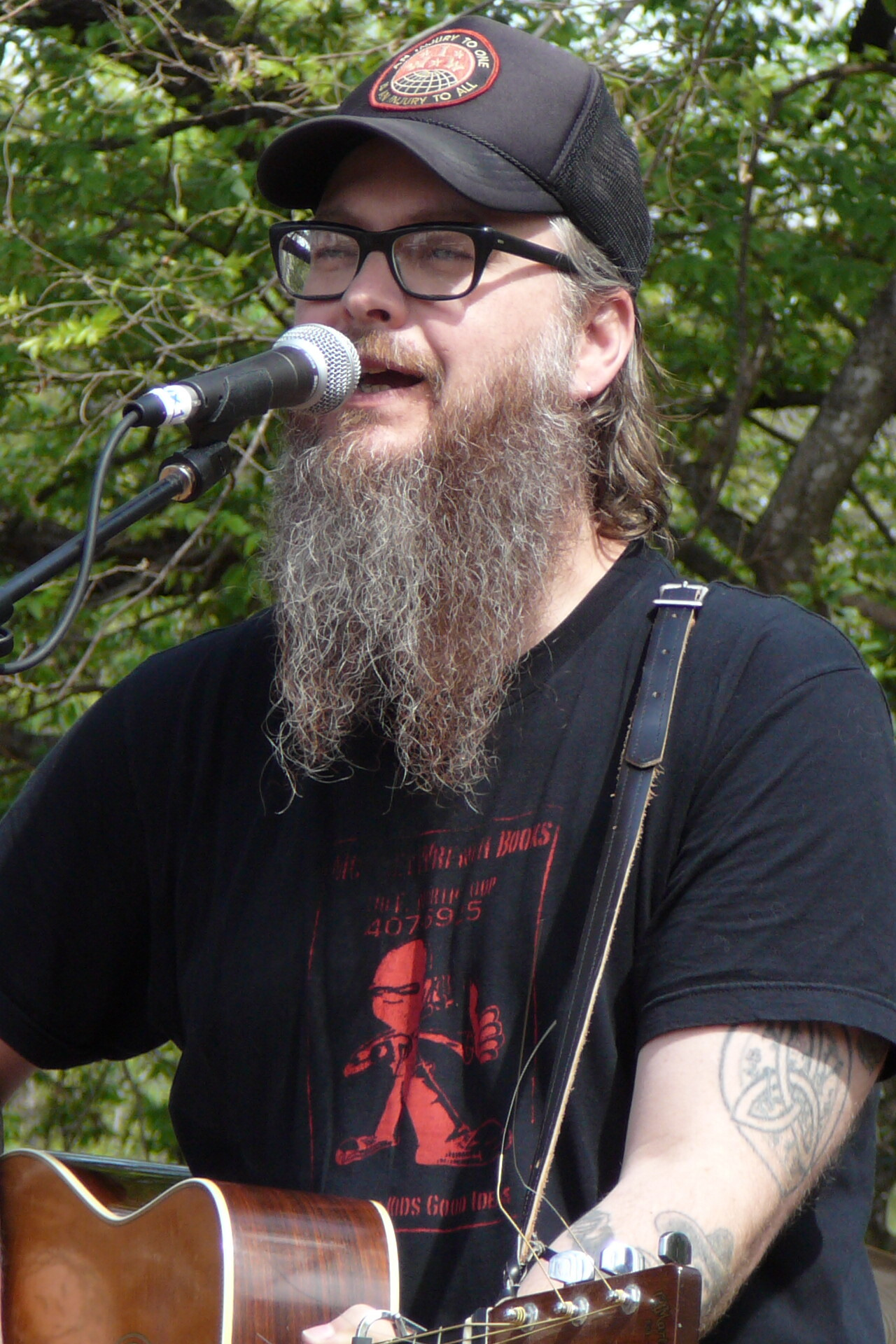
Otis Gibbs

In 1989, shortly before his death, the radical activist Abbie Hoffman purportedly called on modern folk singers to consume the ashes in order to honor Hill's memory, dubbing them corpus anarchi, or "the body of anarchy", and advocating for the ashes of those singers to be consumed in turn by later generations. Among the figures Hoffman called upon to consume the ashes was his friend Billy Bragg, a British songwriter and activist. Bragg was surprised but saw the suggestion as tongue-in-cheek, due to Hoffman's reputation for pranks. Some years after Hoffman's death, a group of IWW members in Chicago approached Bragg after a performance in Chicago, and presented him with a portion of the ashes to consume; he felt obligated to do so, later stating that "It was kind of Abbie's last prank and I felt I would be betraying him if I didn't live up to his sense of humor by doing it".

Bragg and the IWW members purchased a bottle of union-produced beer, toasted to Hill, Hoffman, and the IWW, after which he swallowed the ashes along with the beer. The IWW members also gave Bragg additional ashes, instructing him to pass them on to another musician mentioned by Hoffman, folk singer Michelle Shocked. Bragg had no opportunity to pass the ashes on to Shocked, during which time he kept them in a plastic bag inside a copy of the Little Red Songbook. Around the 2000s, learning that Shocked had become a born again Christian, Bragg instead chose to pass the ashes to American folk singer Otis Gibbs. Gibbs swallowed the ashes on Bragg's insistence, and wrote an album in honor of them in 2010.
