= Katie Phar =

American singer and activist (c. 1899 – 1943)

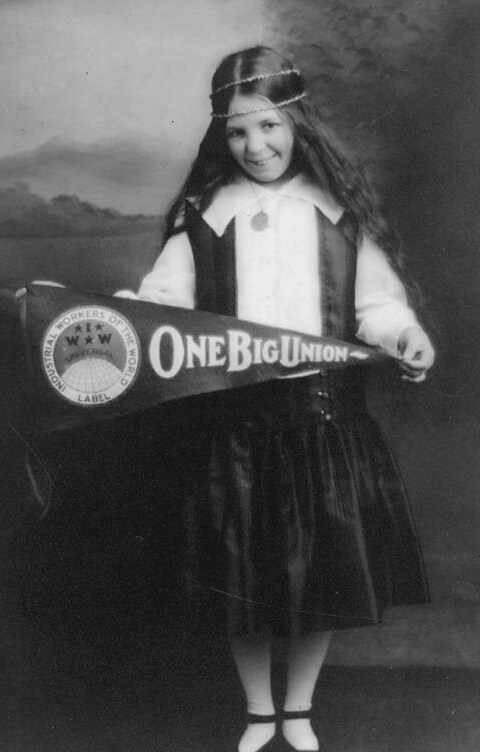
- Phar, c. 1910
- Born: c. 1899 likely Spokane, Washington, U.S.
- Died: June 1, 1943 (aged 43–44); Seattle, Washington, U.S.
- Burial place: Lake View Cemetery, Seattle
- Known for: Industrial Workers of the World activist and singer

Katie M. Phar (c. 1899 – June 1, 1943) was an American singer and labor activist with the Industrial Workers of the World (IWW), an anarcho-syndicalist labor union. Dubbed the "IWW Songbird", Phar was raised by IWW members in Spokane, Washington, and began to perform union songs during the 1909 Spokane free speech fight. She led an IWW children's choir and became one of the most popular entertainers within the union. She corresponded with IWW songwriter Joe Hill before his execution in 1915 and may have inspired his song The Rebel Girl. She remained a member of the union until her death and was recorded to have performed at IWW meetings as late as 1930. By 1941, she conducted charity work for a Seattle church.

== Early life ==
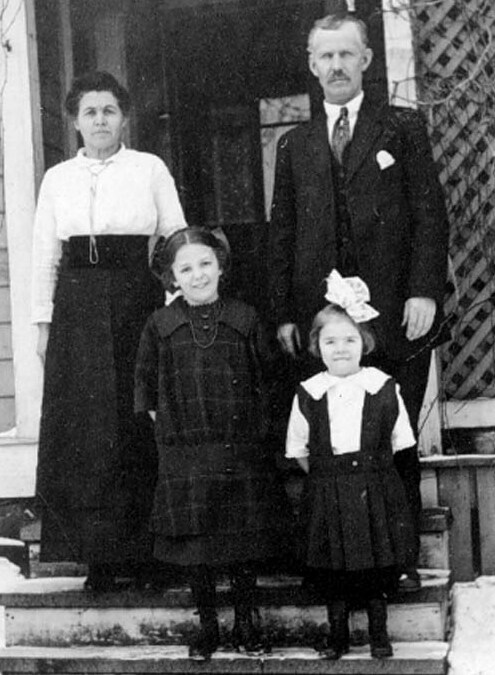
Phar (second from left) with her family, c. 1910

Around 1899, Katie M. Phar was born in Washington state, likely in Spokane. Her parents were warehouseman John F. Phar and homemaker Christina Phar. As a young child, Phar's parents took her to the Spokane meetings of the Industrial Workers of the World (IWW), an anarcho-syndicalist labor union. Families frequently brought their children to such meetings, which often included speeches, skits, and singing, through which Phar learned many IWW songs.

In 1908, in response to IWW organizers making street speeches to workers, the city of Spokane banned all forms of public street speaking. Religious organizations were given an exemption the following year, prompting the IWW to begin the Spokane free speech fight in October 1909. The IWW repeatedly challenged the ordinance through public demonstrations, resulting in over a hundred arrests. Phar began to sing with the IWW in these demonstrations and became an ardent supporter of the union. That Christmas, the Spokane IWW chapter gifted her a locket in recognition.

Phar became the leader of an IWW children's choir, as well as the song leader for the Spokane chapter's events. She was among the most well-known women in the union and was frequently mentioned by the union's newspapers, gaining the nickname "Songbird of the IWW". Later recollections by IWW organizers portray her fondly; Herb Edwards described her as "without a doubt the most popular [entertainer] in the whole organization".

== Correspondence with Joe Hill ==
In 1914, Phar began to write letters to Joe Hill, an IWW songwriter and activist who had been imprisoned after he had been accused of murdering two Salt Lake City grocers. The IWW rallied to his defense, believing that he had been framed for the crime. Phar was likely familiar with Hill, a popular songwriter for the union, and may have heard of his trial in the union's journal Solidarity. Phar's letters to Hill are lost, possibly destroyed after his execution, but his responses have been preserved and published. One of his first letters to Phar was written on October 7, 1914, and featured a watercolor rose alongside the wish "I hope your friendship will keep as long as this little rose." In their correspondence, Hill encouraged Phar to continue with her music studies, expressed delight that she wished to become a musician, and asked her to continue to update him on IWW organizing in Spokane.

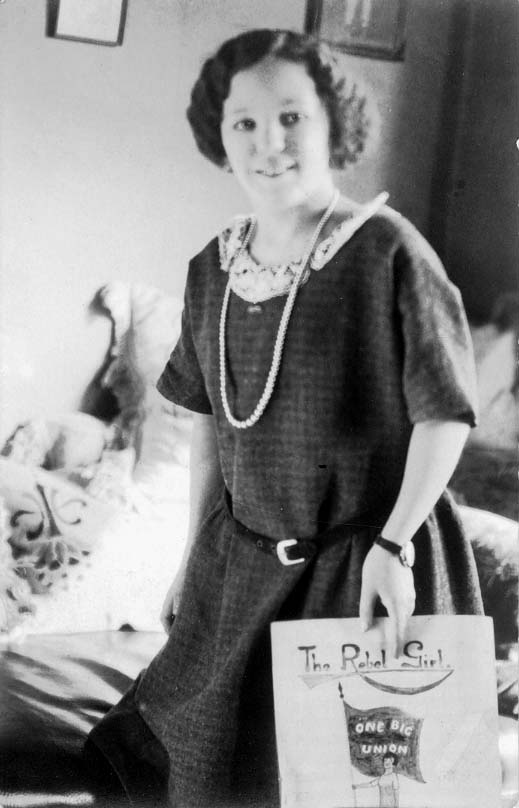
Phar holding a copy of the sheet music for "The Rebel Girl", c. 1920s

Along with labor leader Elizabeth Gurley Flynn, Phar is commonly cited as the inspiration for Joe Hill's 1915 song "The Rebel Girl", which praises the courage of female IWW organizers. Hill may have had multiple inspirations for the song. In May 1915, Hill sent Phar a handwritten copy of the sheet music and lyrics for "The Rebel Girl", alongside another, unknown song. Hill called on her to perform the song for Flynn when she came to Spokane, noting "Gurley Flynn is certainly some Rebel Girl and when you and her get together there will be 'two of a kind'". This was Hill's last letter to Phar before he was executed that November.

== Later life and death ==
The Phar family moved to Seattle by the late 1910s, and Katie Phar remained active with the Seattle IWW, directing a group of young entertainers. In the organizing and trial following the 1916 Everett massacre, a gunfight between IWW members and local authorities, defendant Thomas Tracy paid for Phar's first IWW union card. After singing at a fundraising event in the late 1910s, chief IWW organizer Bill Haywood was said to have picked her up and proclaimed "Your songs have brought thousands of dollars in defense of men and women who will make history."

Phar was a member of the IWW throughout her life and was noted to have performed songs to open Seattle IWW meetings up to the 1930s. She fell seriously ill by March 1928, and was left in need of blood transfusions. Three IWW members volunteered to serve as her blood donors, drawing lots after the health test to determine who had "first privilege" to donate. Her condition was reported to be life-threatening that July, but by August she had begun to recover.

In 1941, Phar led charity work for the disabled at the Emmanuel Methodist Church in Seattle. She died from unknown causes in Seattle on June 1, 1943. She was buried next to her father at Lake View Cemetery. The IWW commemorated Phar in a memorial edition of its Little Red Songbook in 1945.
