= Magnus Olson =

Norwegian career criminal

Magnus Olson (Sept 1881–Dec 1972), best known by the pseudonym Frank Z. Wilson, was a career criminal who was born in Tromsø, Norway, the youngest of five children. He is mainly notable for having been a suspect in the murder of John G. Morrison before investigators turned their focus to Joe Hill.

== Morrison murder ==
Olson was arrested for the murder of John G. Morrison, a Salt Lake City area grocer and former policeman, and his son in 1914. This murder is most notable as the crime for which songwriter Joe Hill, a member of the Industrial Workers of the World, was later executed. Olson was released by the Salt Lake City police, and turned over to the Sheriff of Elko County, Nevada, for a lesser crime (burglary of a boxcar) to which he confessed while in Salt Lake City custody.

== Other criminal activities ==
Magnus Olson used many aliases during his life of crime, including Frank Z. Wilson, James Farmer, James Morton, and F.Z. Wheeler.

In the 1920s Olson worked for Al Capone as a bodyguard and bill collector. When the Saint Valentine's Day massacre occurred in Chicago in 1929, seven men were killed. The killers left the scene in an automobile registered to Magnus Olson.

Olson was incarcerated in the Nevada State Penitentiary, and in Folsom State Prison in California, and served time in at least seven other states.

== Legacy ==
Writing under the pseudonym James "Big Jim" Morton, Olson told of his life of crime in the Saturday Evening Post in 1950 in an article entitled "I Was the King of the Thieves" . In 2011, author William M. Adler published a biography of Joe Hill, The Man Who Never Died, The Life, Times, and Legacy of Joe Hill, American Labor Icon, with new evidence indicating that Hill may have been innocent of the deaths of John G. Morrison and his son, and that Magnus Olson was a more likely suspect.
