= The Tramp (song) =

Song
- Language: English
- Published: 1913
- Songwriter(s): Composer: George F. Root; Lyricist: Joe Hill

"The Tramp" (1913) is, together with "The Preacher and the Slave," one of labor organizer Joe Hill's most well-known songs. The lyrics tell about an able-bodied but unemployed man who wanders around looking for work, but is not welcome anywhere – even in church, Heaven, and Hell – and thus must "keep on a-tramping".

The tune is borrowed from the song "Tramp! Tramp! Tramp!", an American Civil War song written in the 1860s by military songwriter George F. Root. Root wrote it for Union soldiers, but the song was so popular that Confederate soldiers wrote their own words, and both sides sang it while marching. That song has appeared in several movies, including Gone with the Wind, and the tune is well-known today as the melody of the Sunday School standard "Jesus Loves the Little Children".

"The Tramp" was first published in the Mar 6, 1913 edition (fifth edition) of the Little Red Songbook of the Industrial Workers of the World (also known as the Wobblies). The Wobblies used songs – parodies set to traditional melodies – to help unionize workers. Hill wrote more than 25 such songs and was considered one of the Wobblies' best lyricists.

== See also ==
- Wobbly lingo
