= The Rebel Girl =

1915 Joe Hill song

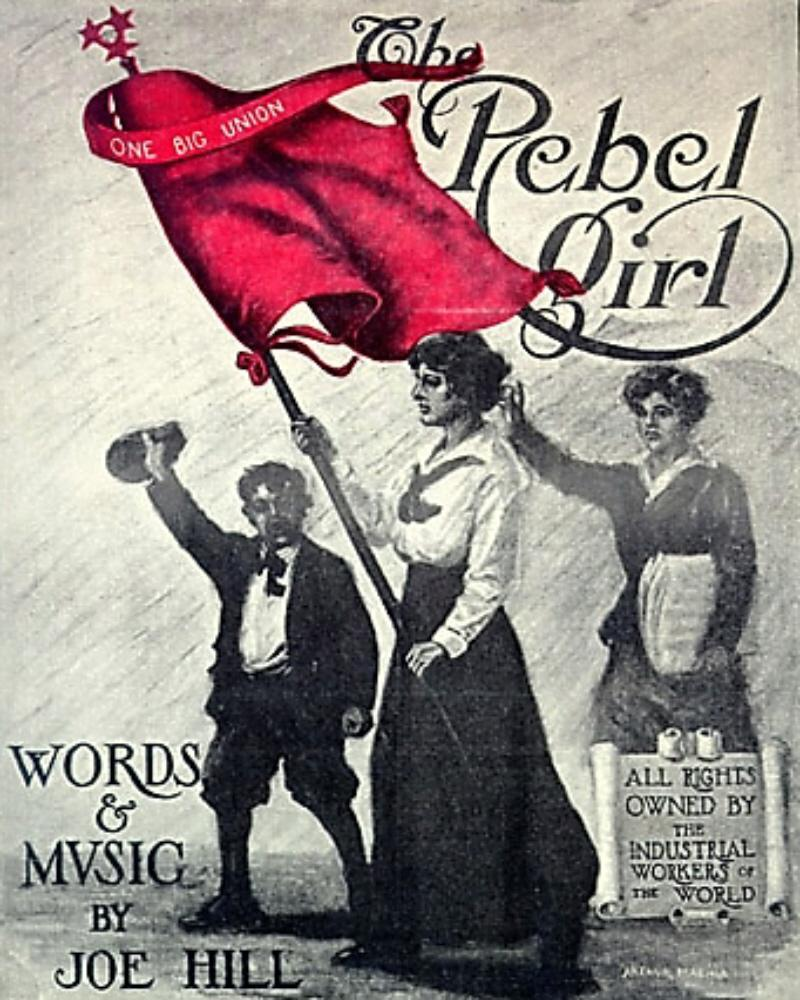

Song
- Language: English
- Published: 1915
- Songwriter: Joe Hill

"The Rebel Girl" is a song written or completed by Joe Hill in 1915. The song was published in the Little Red Songbook of the Industrial Workers of the World, and as sheet music in 1915. It is said that Hill wrote the song for IWW orator Elizabeth Gurley Flynn, claimed and proven by Gurley Flynn herself in her memoir. (It has also been claimed that it was inspired by Katie Phar and Agnes Fair.)

The song was recorded with modernized lyrics by Hazel Dickens on the 1990 Smithsonian Folkways album Don't Mourn, Organize! Songs of Labor Songwriter Joe Hill.

Hill sent copies of the sheet music with his own art work to both Flynn and the Scandinavian Propaganda League. The IWW used cover art by Arthur Machia in their printed version of the sheet music.

== See also ==
Works related to The Rebel Girl at Wikisource

- Wobbly lingo
- List of socialist songs
