= There Is Power in the Blood =

Song written by Lewis E. Jones

- Hymn by Lewis Edgar Jones
- Other name: Power in the Blood
- Year: 1899
- Genre: Gospel, Hymn
- Language: English
- Meter: 10.9.10.8.9.6.9.8
- Recorded: February 12, 1928

"There Is Power in the Blood" is a hymn written in 1899 by Lewis E. Jones. "There is Power in the Blood" has been performed by Angela Primm, Dolly Parton, Marty Robbins, Alan Jackson, Bill and Gloria Gaither and Kristin Hayter.

Jones wrote "There Is Power in the Blood" in Mountain Lake Park, Maryland while attending a camp meeting. The manuscript was purchased by Henry Lake Gilmour, who, with William James Kirkpatrick, published the hymn in Songs of Praise and Victory less than a year after it was written. Later that same year, "There is Power in the Blood" was included in Kirkpatrick's book Gospel Praises.

== Lyrics ==
Would you be free from the burden of sin?
There's pow'r in the blood, pow'r in the blood;
Would you o'er evil a victory win?
There's wonderful pow'r in the blood

Chorus:
There is pow'r, pow'r, wonder-working pow'r
In the blood of the Lamb;
There is pow'r, pow'r, wonder-working pow'r
In the precious blood of the Lamb.

Would you be free from your passion and pride?
There's pow'r in the blood, pow'r in the blood;
Come for a cleansing to Calvary's tide–
There's wonderful pow'r in the blood.

Chorus

Would you be whiter, yes brighter than snow?
There's pow'r in the blood, pow'r in the blood;
Sin-stains are lost in its life-giving flow–
There's wonderful pow'r in the blood.

Chorus

Would you do service for Jesus, your King?
There's pow'r in the blood, pow'r in the blood;
Would you live daily His praises to sing?
There's wonderful pow'r in the blood.

Chorus

== Parodies ==
The 1913 lyric "There Is Power in a Union" by activist Joe Hill was published in Songs of the Workers (Little Red Songbook) by the Industrial Workers of the World for use to the melody.
