= Spokane free speech fight =

1909–1910 protest movement in Spokane, Washington

- Part of the IWW free speech fights
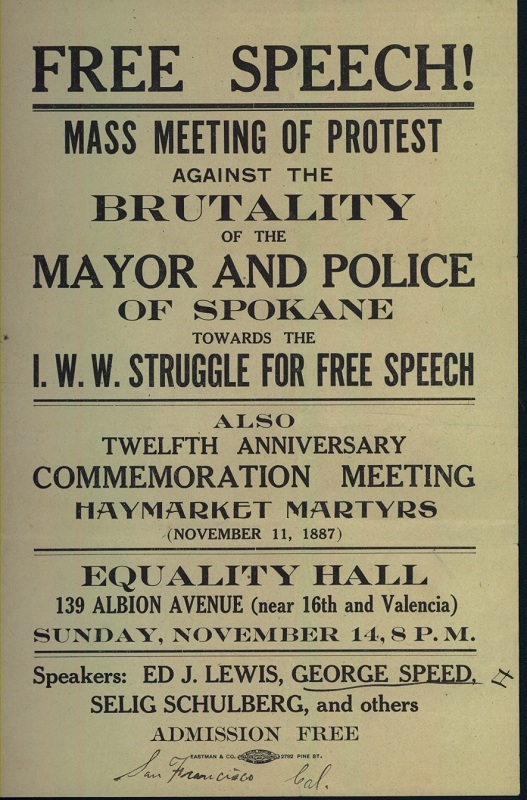
- Poster for an IWW mass meeting during the fight, November 1909
- Date: November 2, 1909 – March 3, 1910 (4 months)
- Location: Spokane, Washington, U.S.
- Caused by: Fraud by employment agencies; City restrictions on public speeches
- Methods: Public demonstrations; Prison strikes
- Concessions: Release of arrested demonstrators; Repeal of public speaking ordinance; Revocation of employment agency licenses

Parties
| Industrial Workers of the World | City of Spokane; Spokane Police Department |

Casualties and losses
| Over 400 arrests; Various injuries; 3 dead in detention | |

The Spokane free speech fight was a protest movement against the government of Spokane, Washington, United States, by the Industrial Workers of the World (IWW), a radical labor union that had been targeted by ordinances against public demonstrations. As Spokane grew rapidly in the 1900s decade, the growing number of employment agencies in the area began using fraudulent or misleading tactics. The IWW began making public demonstrations and speeches against these agencies in 1908. In response to political pressure from the agencies, the Spokane City Council banned street speeches and demonstrations. In August 1909, a new ordinance was passed to allow exceptions to be granted to religious organizations. The IWW, viewing this as a violation of free speech, had themselves arrested and brought to trial to challenge the law. Large protests were organized for the date of the trial, November 2; although the latter ordinance was found unconstitutional, the first remained in force, and the IWW continued large demonstrations, with many union members coming to the city from elsewhere to participate.

Throughout November 1909, the city cracked down on demonstrators and the IWW. Over 400 IWW demonstrators were arrested, with arrestees alleging that they were beaten and threatened. IWW sources describe inmates being kept in unheated cells, but periodically moved into a cramped and extremely hot "sweat box" with other inmates, where they were held to the point of fainting. Exacerbated by a hunger strike, three inmates died from the effects of the poor conditions. Two members were tried for conspiracy charges: one was found guilty, while the other, the labor leader Elizabeth Gurley Flynn, was acquitted. On March 3, the IWW and Spokane government reached a compromise to end the fight: the IWW agreed to halt lawsuits against the city, while the city released all arrested demonstrators and on March 9, repealed the ordinance. IWW leaders described the outcome as a practical victory which brought the union public attention, while Spokane newspapers reported it as a clear victory for the city.

== Background ==
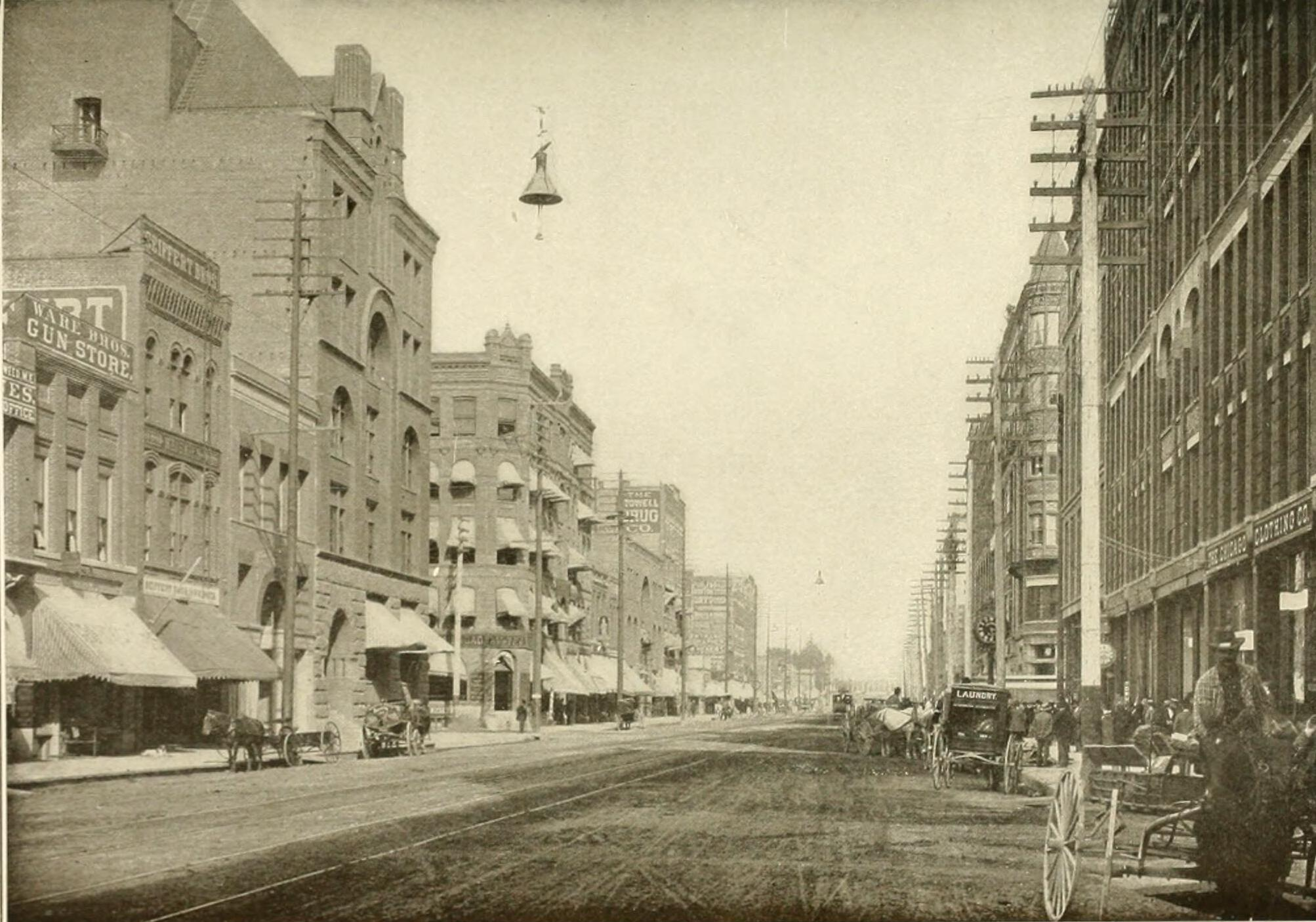
View of downtown Spokane in 1908

The city of Spokane, Washington grew rapidly in the early 1900s. Between 1906 and 1910, its population increased by over 60%, from roughly 85,000 to 141,000. Many loggers overwintered in Spokane, as the regional timberlands halted operations in the snow. This led to the growth of employment agencies in Spokane, targeting loggers, railroad workers, construction workers, and various transient laborers. Employment agents, known derisively as "sharks", would approach jobseekers and offer information on a job opening for a fee, often one or two dollars. These leads were often misleading or fraudulent: sometimes, workers would arrive at the job site (usually outside the city) and find that the promised job did not exist, or that it had already been filled. In other cases, the agent would contract to split the profits from fees with the employer, who would then rapidly fire workers, often within a week. One lumber company was recorded to have hired 3,000 men over the course of the winter, maintaining only a 50-man crew. By 1908, there were 31 agencies along Stevens Street in Spokane.

The Industrial Workers of the World (IWW) is a radical labor union, often described as anarcho-syndicalist, founded in 1905. Opposed to electoral politics, the IWW used strike actions, demonstrations, public speeches, and direct action, aiming to liberate the proletariat through the merger of all trade unions into 'One Big Union'. Among the unions which joined to found the IWW were the Western Federation of Miners and the American Labor Union, large militant unions with their base of support in the western states. By 1907, the IWW was active in the Pacific Northwest, leading a lumber worker's strike in Portland, Oregon. Spokane became the largest center of IWW activity in the Northwest by the end of the decade, where the local maintained a large union hall and library, and published the main IWW periodical in the western states, the Industrial Worker. By 1909, they had 3,000 members in Spokane, of whom half paid dues.

=== Demonstrations against employment agencies ===
By 1908, the Spokane IWW began demonstrating against the employment agents in front of their offices on Stevens Street, with "Don't Buy Jobs" as their slogan to jobseekers. The employment agents formed the Associated Employment Agencies of Spokane to represent themselves to the Spokane City Council and urged for street speaking to be restricted. The IWW alleged that the agencies bribed the city government. In late December 1908, the city council passed Ordinance No. 3890, banning public speeches within city limits, forcing the IWW to hold its events far removed from the agency offices. According to an Industrial Worker account, this was initially unenforced, and the union continued its public events for some time. In mid-January 1909, a large group of angry demonstrators gathered and began to throw ice and rocks at the windows of the Red Cross Employment Agency. IWW organizer James H. Walsh rallied the crowd to disperse to the union hall, because he alleged that Pinkerton agents had been attempting to incite the crowd to riot.

By February, the Industrial Worker said that several employment agencies had been damaged by demonstrators, and that the Spokane Police Department had warned the union against any future public speeches. In March, a group of 48 IWW members led by Walsh held another public speech, and were arrested. Walsh agreed to make his trial a test case for the constitutionality of Spokane's ban on public speaking. Walsh was found guilty at the municipal court and superior court before the case was dropped. No major demonstrations were held in the following months.

== Fight ==
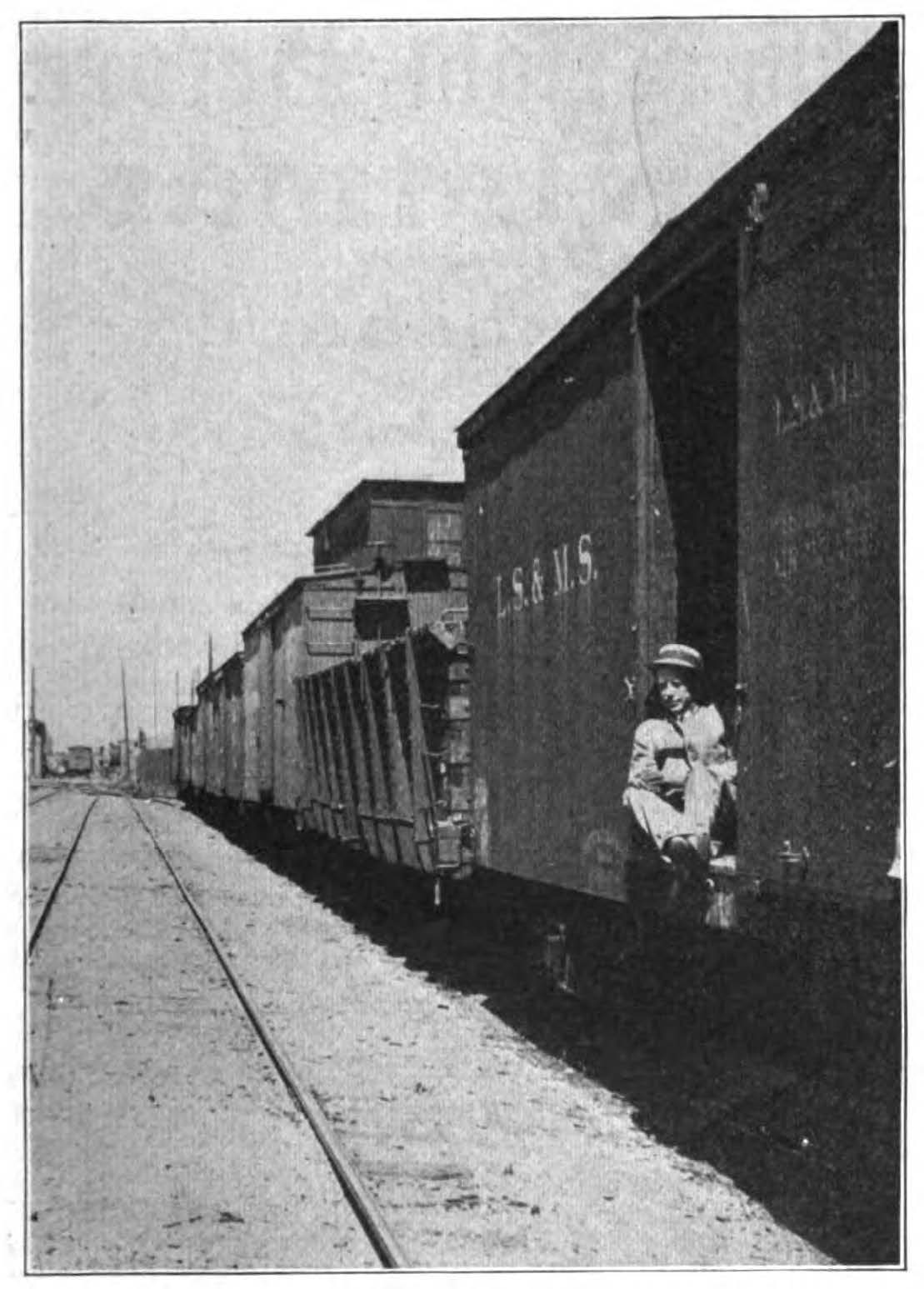
An IWW member freighthopping to the Spokane fight, 1909

Following opposition from religious groups such as the Salvation Army, the Spokane City Council passed an amendment to the public speaking ban on August 18, 1909. Ordinance No. 4391 allowed "regular religious organizations" to hold street meetings if they secured the consent of the mayor. This upset the IWW, who viewed the exception as a violation of their free speech: the Industrial Worker declared it "discrimination against the IWW, who had to remain in their hall while the religious fanatics held forth on the street". On September 19, the Spokane local's Executive Council voted to form a committee to petition the mayor for the right to hold street meetings. According to a later account by an IWW organizer, the city promised to "frame an ordinance satisfactory to [the union]" if they delayed any demonstrations until after Walsh's case was resolved. However, the case was soon dropped, and the Salvation Army's street preaching incensed the IWW into challenging the law directly.

On October 25, 1909, national IWW organizer James P. Thompson, alongside various other IWW members, deliberately had himself arrested for violating the ordinance. The union rallied members from other regional locals to come to Spokane in support of the trial, dubbing the trial date of November 2 "Free Speech Day". The Industrial Worker ran an advertisement on October 28 headlined "Wanted: Men To Fill the Jails of Spokane".

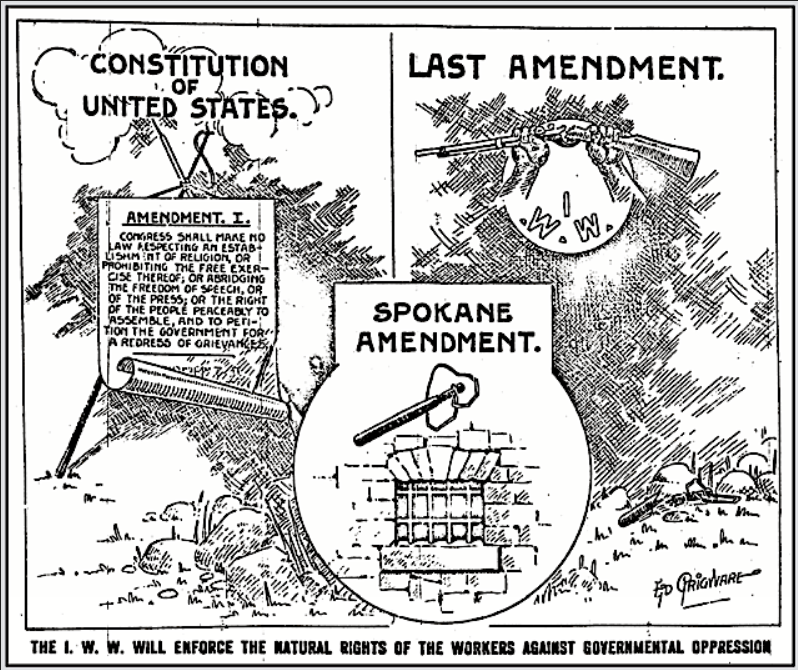
Industrial Worker cartoon in support of the free speech fight, November 1909

Prior to the trial, the Spokane police vowed to enforce order, stating that they could hold 500 prisoners if needed. Spokane mayor Nelson Pratt attempted to negotiate a deal with the IWW, offering the release of all IWW prisoners if the union agreed to abide by the Thompson case ruling. Meanwhile, the local Socialist Party branch and American Federation of Labor unions petitioned the city council to replace the ordinance with a much less restrictive policy on street demonstrations. Neither of these compromises was accepted.

=== Arrests and resistance ===
Thompson was acquitted by Spokane Municipal Court Judge Mann on November 2, who ruled the second ordinance unconstitutional. However, the initial ordinance remained in force, and the IWW continued its planned demonstrations. On Mann's recommendation, the Spokane police arrested 103 under disorderly conduct charges. The following day, the police raided the IWW union hall, closing it and the offices of the Industrial Worker, and arrested four men, including the paper's chief editor James Wilson. Anyone later caught selling the paper, including newsboys, was arrested. Volunteer editors continued the paper for several issues, before the publication was moved to Seattle.

On November 30 or 31, a group of seven prominent IWW leaders was arrested in Spokane on conspiracy charges. This group included Elizabeth Gurley Flynn, who had joined the Spokane fight and taken over editorship of the Industrial Worker after participating in another free speech fight in Missoula, Montana the previous month. In addition to the conspiracy charges, over 400 people were arrested for violating the public speaking ordinance between November 1909 and March 1910. An IWW fundraiser for the fight, Fred Heslewood, was arrested in Coeur d'Alene, Idaho, and subjected to an extradition trial. A Spokane detective was arrested for perjury during the trial, after testifying that Heslewood had been organizing in Spokane on a date for which he was later proven to be in Seattle.

Most arrestees were sentenced to jail times of 30 days and fines of $100. Inmates accounts describe extremely poor conditions, police beating and threatening to kill them, and some inmates suffering head injuries and broken limbs. Men were packed tightly into a "sweat box", a 6-by-8-foot (1.8 by 2.4 m) room heated by a steam pipe, leading many to faint from the heat. After as long as 15 hours, the men were returned to cold, unheated cells without any bed or blanket.

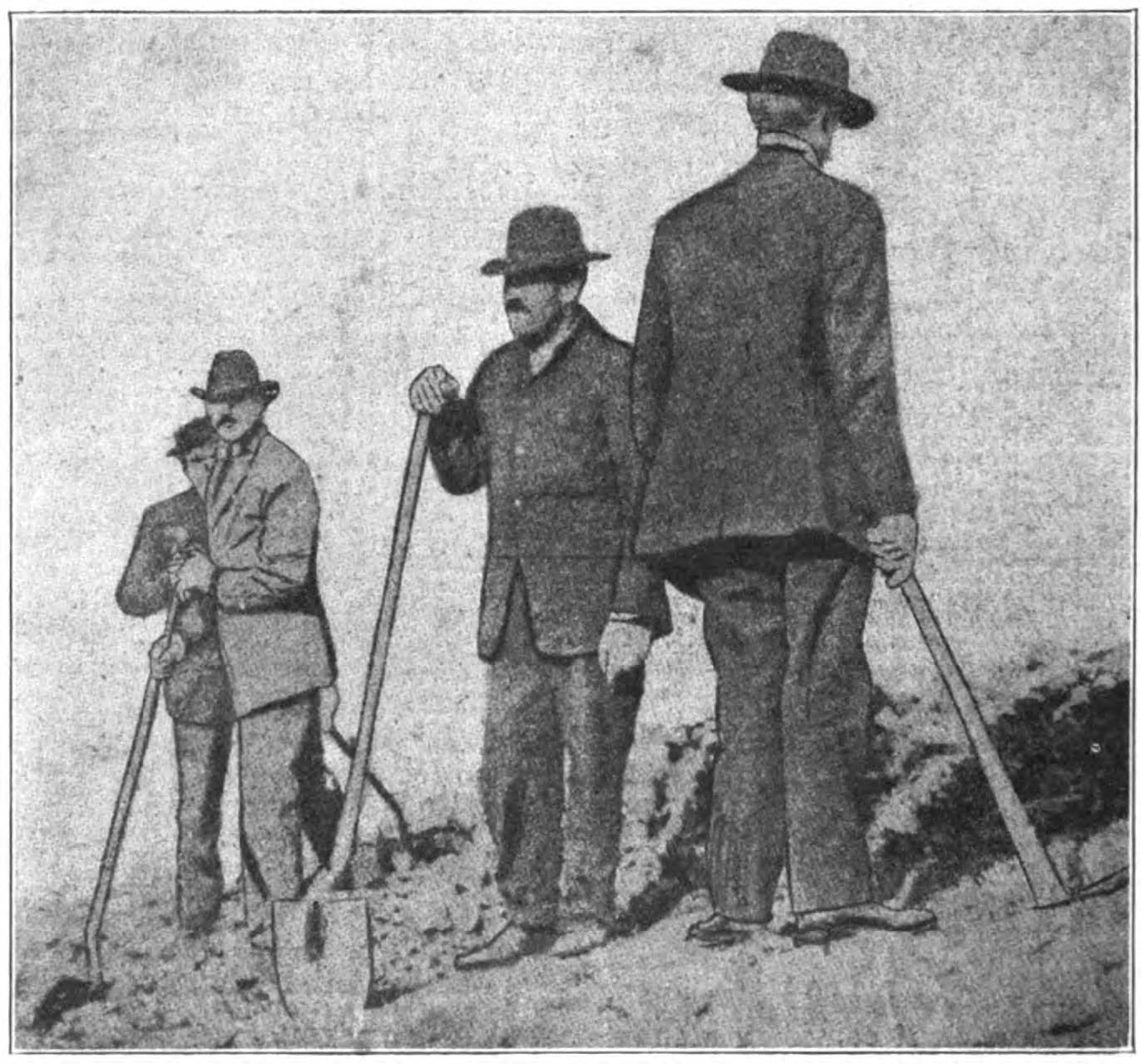
Imprisoned IWW members working at a prison rock pile during the fight

Arrested IWW members resisted through a prison work strike and hunger strike. Labor organizer William Z. Foster was imprisoned for 47 days during the strike, later writing an account in The Socialist deploring the poor conditions of the Spokane City Jail. According to his account, a group of roughly 40 imprisoned demonstrators formed a union and held meetings while imprisoned, and were able to convince various other imprisoned workers to join the IWW through "propaganda meetings". Flynn also published an account criticizing the municipal jail, alleging that many inmates in the women's section worked as prostitutes under police control. Mayor Pratt wrote a response in The Spokesman-Review calling her statement "wild and hysterical". The IWW responded with a defamation suit against the mayor and two other city officials, asking for 10,000$ in damages each. By March 1910, the city and various officials were targeted by lawsuits totaling 100,000$ in damages.

Police brutality and crackdowns against the demonstrators pushed many liberals and Socialist Party members in Spokane to defend the IWW. From November 16 to December 1909, Spokane Central Labor Council and the Freemasons Union began a petition drive to modify the public speaking ordinance. This petition gained about 1200 to 1500 signatures by late December, short of the 2800 required to trigger a public vote.

As the number of inmates grew larger than the city jail's capacity, the unused Franklin School building was converted into additional jail space. The school was unheated, and three IWW members died during their confinement from a combination of cold temperatures, illness, and the effects of their hunger strike. Inmates at the Franklin School were periodically taken to the city jail for showers. IWW members claimed they were sprayed with extremely hot water followed by extremely cold water, before being returned to their unheated cells. In December 1910, the Spokane Press reported that the Spokane IWW, including a group of 200 previously arrested in the fight, had voted to halt the prison work strikes in order to secure better food for the inmates.

Most of the conspiracy charges against demonstrators were dropped before a trial could be held. Only two IWW members were tried in court, beginning in February 1910: Flynn and the Italian-born organizer Charley Filigno, who had initially sent Flynn a telegram to come to Spokane. Flynn was acquitted, while Filigno was found guilty. This greatly upset the prosecuting attorney, who reportedly followed the jury foreman into the hallway and exclaimed "What in the hell do you fellows mean by acquitting the most guilty, and convicting the man, far less guilty?" The foreman responded that no jury would "send that pretty Irish girl to jail merely for being big-hearted and idealistic".

== Resolution ==
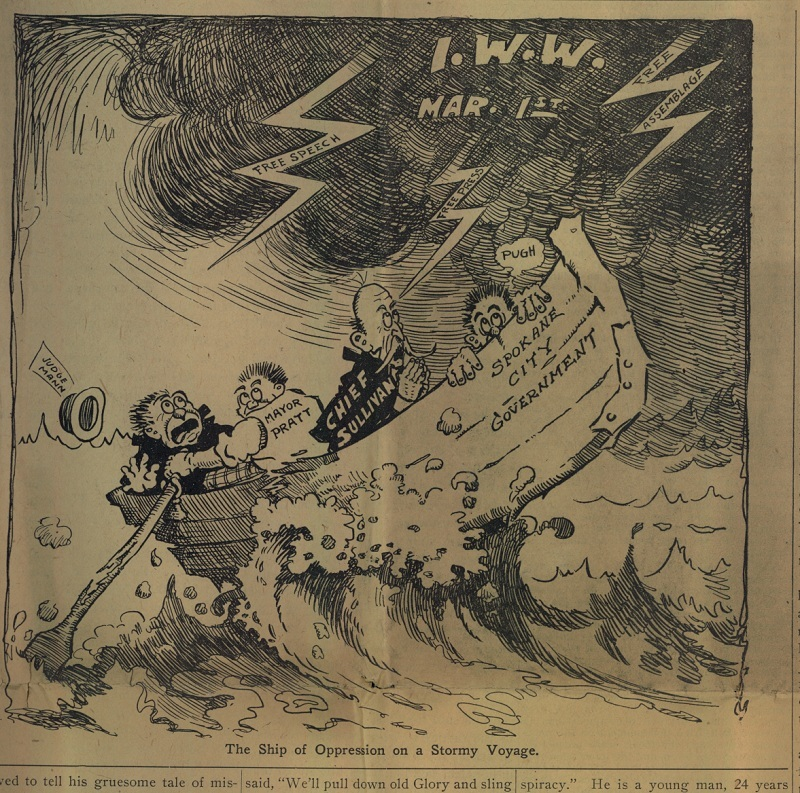
IWW cartoon depicting Spokane city leaders in fear of the IWW's planned demonstrations, 1910

On February 5, 1910, the Industrial Worker called for IWW members from the surrounding region to travel to Spokane on March 1, for an expanded round of public demonstrations. On February 28 and March 3, the union negotiated with city leaders, calling off the planned demonstrations. Both sides then traveled to Coeur d'Alene to allow Heslewood to participate. While the Spokane government agreed to release all IWW prisoners, the union agreed to drop its damage suits and refrain from publicly speaking until the ordinance could be repealed. Both the IWW union hall and the Industrial Worker were allowed to resume operations. Additionally, Heslewood agreed to surrender to Spokane police.

By a unanimous vote, the Spokane City Council agreed to repeal the public speaking ordinance on March 9. The city council suspended the licenses of more than half of the employment agencies; however, many of the most notorious were spared, and the total number of agencies continued to grow. The Washington State Legislature passed a law regulating employment agencies in 1915.

The extent to which the fight ended in the IWW's favor is debated. Flynn dubbed it a "practical victory", while historian Robert Tyler, writing in 1967, described it as a "dubious victory" in the context of the revolutionary goals of the IWW. Spokane newspapers described the March 3 agreement as an unambiguous victory for the city; the Press headlined the news "City Wins in IWW Fight", reporting "now that the IWW has been crushed, that there is no need to make citizens hold meetings in the mire of barnyards and backdoors [...] so it is now considering the possibility of repealing the ordinance". National organizer Bill Haywood described the Spokane fight as a major factor in the IWW's growth over the following years, saying that it captured "the imagination of the working class throughout the country".

Jess Walter's 2020 novel The Cold Millions includes the Spokane Free speech fight as an element of its plot. The book's characters include several historic figures and well as fictional characters.
