= There Is Power in a Union =

Song
- Language: English
- Published: 1913
- Songwriters: Composer: Lewis E. Jones; Lyricist: Joe Hill

"There Is Power in a Union" is a song written by Joe Hill in 1913. The Industrial Workers of the World (commonly known as the Wobblies) concentrated much of its labor trying to organize migrant workers in lumber and construction camps. They sometimes had competition for the attention of the workers from religious organizations. The song uses the tune of Lewis E. Jones' 1899 hymn "There Is Power in the Blood (Of the Lamb)".

"There Is Power in a Union" was first published in the Little Red Songbook in 1913, and has been recorded several times.

Billy Bragg reused the title for his 1986 song "There Is Power in a Union" on the Talking with the Taxman About Poetry album, which is set to the tune of "Battle Cry of Freedom".

== Lyrics and style ==
Would you have freedom from Wage slavery,
Then join in the grand Industrial band;
Would you from mis'ry and hunger be free,
Then come, do your share, like a man.

There is pow'r there is pow'r in a band of workingmen,
When they stand hand in hand,
That's a pow'r, that's a pow'r
That must rule in every land—
One Industrial Union Grand.

Would you have mansions of gold in the sky,
and live in a shack, way in the back?
Would you have wings up in heaven to fly,
And starve here with rags on your back?

If you've had 'nuff of the "blood of the lamb"
Then join in the grand industrial band;
If, for a change, you would have eggs and ham,
Then come, do your share, like a man.

If you like sluggers to beat off your head,
Then don't organize, all unions despise.
If you want nothing before you are dead,
Shake hands with your boss and look Wise.

Come, all ye workers, from every land,
Come, join in the grand industrial band;
Then we our share of this earth shall demand.
Come on! Do your share, like a man.

— Gibbs M. Smith, Joe Hill, Peregrine Smith Books, Salt Lake City, 1969/1984, pages 249–250

== In popular culture ==
A version of the song (with altered lyrics) is used in the Wasteland 3 DLC "The Battle of Steeltown" (2021).

== See also ==
- Wobbly lingo
- List of socialist songs
