= The Preacher and the Slave =

Song by Joe Hill

Song
- Written: 1911
- Published: 1911
- Songwriter(s): Joe Hill

"The Preacher and the Slave" is a song written by Joe Hill in 1911. It was written as a parody of the Christian hymn "In the Sweet By-and-By". Copying or using the musical style of the hymn was also a way to capture the emotional resonance of that style of music and use it for a non-religious purpose.

The Industrial Workers of the World (IWW, also commonly known as the Wobblies) concentrated much of its labor trying to organize migrant workers in lumber and construction camps. When the workers returned to the cities, the Wobblies faced the Salvation Army, which they satirized as the "Starvation Army", who were said to have tried to drown out IWW with their religious music. Hill had first encountered the Salvation Army in Sweden when he was a child.

Several songs were written parodying the Salvation Army's hymns, "The Preacher and the Slave" being the most successful. In this song, Joe Hill coined the phrase "pie in the sky". The song is often referred to as "Pie in the Sky", or as "Long Haired Preachers" (which was its original title). It was first published in the 4th edition of the Little Red Songbook in 1911. Harry McClintock is credited with being the first person to sing "Long Haired Preachers", a song by Joe Hill, in public. Woody Guthrie was also known to sing this song, as well as Pete Seeger and Utah Phillips.

The name of the song is also used as the title of a novel based on Joe Hill's life written by Wallace Stegner.

"Pie In The Sky"
Recording of the lyrics & chords contained within this article

== See also ==
- List of socialist songs
- Wobbly lingo
