= Joe Hill (activist) =

Swedish-American labor activist (1879–1915)

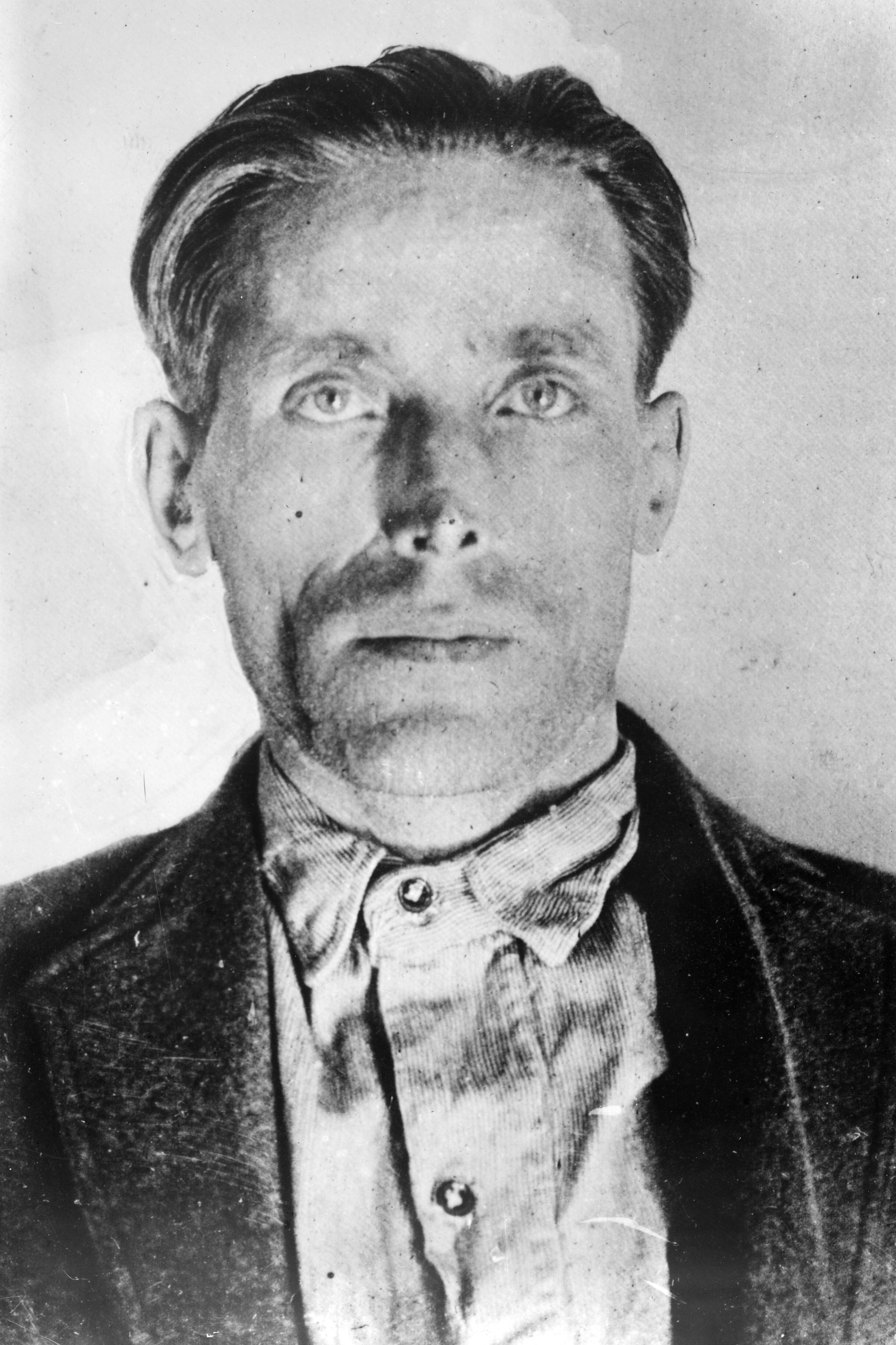
- Hill c. 1915
- Born: Joel Emmanuel Hägglund; October 7, 1879; Gävle, Sweden
- Died: November 19, 1915 (aged 36); Sugar House Prison, Utah, U.S.
- Cause of death: Execution by firing squad
- Other name: Joseph Hillstrom
- Occupations: Labor organizer, poet, songwriter

Signature
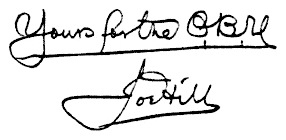

Joe Hill (born Joel Emmanuel Hägglund and also known as Joseph Hillstrom, October 7, 1879 – November 19, 1915) was a Swedish-American labor activist, poet, and songwriter. He was an itinerant worker for much of his life, organizing with the Industrial Workers of the World (IWW), a militant anarcho-syndicalist labor union. His 1914 conviction for murder and execution under questionable evidence led to him becoming a folk hero among the American labor and radical movements.

Born to an impoverished and religious family in Gävle, Sweden, Hägglund learned to play musical instruments from a young age, but was forced to work in factories following the death of his father in 1887. After the death of his mother in 1902, he emigrated with his brother to the United States, where he adopted the name Joe Hill. He traveled across much of North America as a hobo while working odd jobs. He likely became associated with the IWW in 1910, while working as a longshoreman in Los Angeles. Hill is thought by some researchers to have participated in the 1911 Magonista rebellion in Mexico. That year, he also submitted his first songs to the IWW's Little Red Songbook. His satire of the Salvation Army, entitled "The Preacher and the Slave", became the most popular and reprinted of the IWW's songs, and Hill rose to be the most prolific and celebrated IWW songwriter. Other songs he later contributed, including "There Is Power in a Union" and "The Rebel Girl", became influential labor songs. His songs were generally sung to the tune of existing hymns or popular music, intended for groups as a means of raising class consciousness.

Salt Lake City grocer John G. Morrison and his son were murdered on the night of January 10, 1914, by a pair of gunmen. That night, Hill visited a doctor in the city with a gunshot wound through his chest, stating that he had been shot after arguing with a friend; a holstered firearm fell out of his pocket while at the office. Hill was arrested several days later and charged with murder. Hill maintained his innocence, but refused to give details about the nature of the argument with his friend, saying that he sought to protect the woman he had argued about from humiliation. The IWW rallied in Hill's defense. After Hill was found guilty and sentenced to death, the union launched a campaign for clemency. The execution was stayed in 1915, but despite the support for clemency by figures such as Swedish diplomat August Ekengren and President Woodrow Wilson, Hill was executed by firing squad on November 19, 1915. He was honored with a large funeral procession in Chicago, while the IWW had his ashes scattered across the world. Now generally considered to be the victim of legal injustice, Hill has been honored by an eponymous folk ballad, alongside other musical and literary tributes.

== Early life and career ==
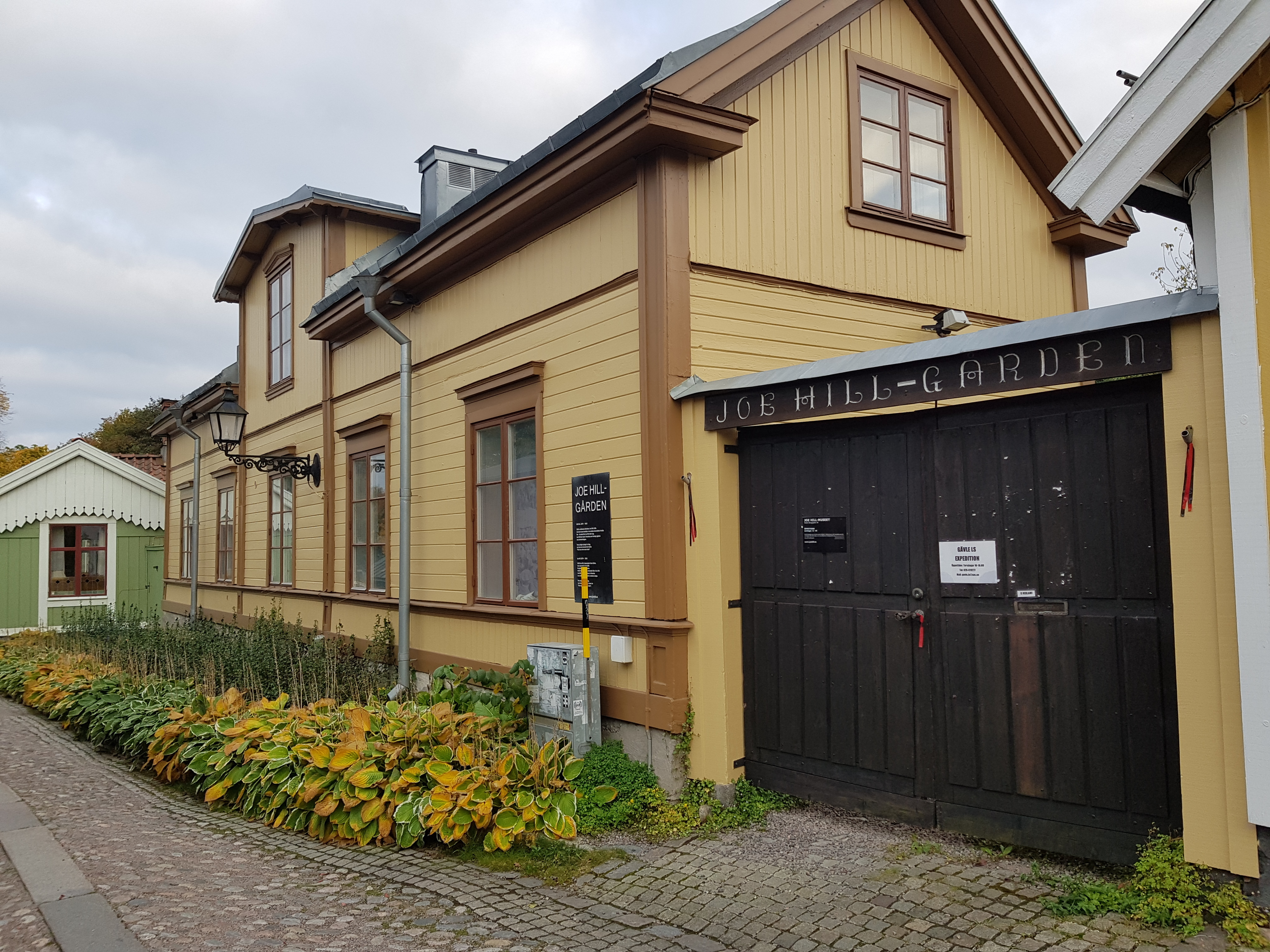
Hägglund's childhood home in Gävle, now the Joe Hill Museum and a union hall

Joe Hill was born Joel Emmanuel Hägglund at his family's home in Gävle, Sweden, on October 7, 1879. His parents, Olaf and Margareta Katarina Hägglund, had nine children, of whom six survived childhood. His father worked as a railway conductor, but the family was quite poor. As both of Hill's parents were devout Lutherans, he attended Sunday school at the town's Bethlehem Church, as well as Salvation Army meetings. His parents both had no interest in politics, but enjoyed music and sang together with their children. Joel learned to play the accordion, organ, guitar, and violin, the last of which was said to be his favorite. He wrote songs about family members and attended concerts at the Gävle worker's association hall.

In 1887, Olaf Hägglund died of internal bleeding following a workplace accident, leaving his family in dire finances. Often unable to afford food or heating, the children were sent to factories to work. Joel first worked at a rope factory, and later on a steam-powered crane. Around 1900, he was afflicted with joint and skin tuberculosis and traveled by himself to Stockholm to seek X-ray therapy. This did not cure his condition, and he intermittently stayed at Serafimer Hospital from April to October 1900 while working odd jobs. Surgical operations left him with scars on his neck and an especially thin nose.

=== Life in America ===
Joel's mother, Margareta Katarina Hägglund, died in 1902 after two years of illness and back pain. Her children, now all old enough to live independently, decided to sell their home and move elsewhere. Four of the Hägglund children moved to different cities in Sweden, while Joel and his brother Paul decided to migrate to the United States, traveling to New York City on the passenger liner Saxonia. Both brothers had studied English at a Swedish YMCA branch. At some point while living in the United States, Joel changed his name to Joseph Hillstrom, later shortened to Joe Hill. Poet and Hill biographer Franklin Rosemont theorized the name was based off Hille, Sweden, where his father was born. He did not stay in close contact with many of his siblings; only Paul and his sister Ester ever learned of his rise to prominence. Although he kept contact with some Swedish friends in the United States, he seems to have had few connections to the Swedish immigrant community or its labor movement.

Hill's activities following his immigration to the United States are mostly unknown, with many common claims about this period based on speculation and hearsay. He spent around a year in New York City, at one point working as a barback and piano player at a saloon in the Bowery neighborhood. According to one researcher, Ture Nerman, Hill spent about two months in Chicago, where he was fired from a job at a machine shop for attempting to organize with other workers; however, no other sources describe him participating in labor organizing until several years later.

In 1905, he sent Christmas cards to his sisters postmarked from Cleveland, Ohio. The following year, he was caught in the 1906 San Francisco earthquake and wrote about his experiences to a newspaper in Gävle. According to this account, he was drafted into the San Francisco Fire Department during the resulting blaze, where he "worked for thirty-six hours without food or drink". He also described spitting on a man who had been selling grossly overpriced food to survivors of the disaster.

Hill traveled frequently, living as a hobo (a migrant worker without a permanent home). He is known to have spent time at uncertain points in Philadelphia and Pittsburgh, Pennsylvania; the Dakotas; Spokane and Seattle, Washington; and Fresno, California. According to later accounts by his friends and his brother Paul, he avoided both smoking and drinking; one friend recalled him calling liquor a "capitalist scheme to poison the working class". He is not known to have ever had a steady romantic partner, and refused to go to brothels when invited by friends. Multiple accounts describe him as an enthusiast of cooking Chinese cuisine.

== Organizing career ==
Hill worked as a laborer in a variety of trades, working variously as a mechanic, longshoreman, construction worker, farm worker, and lumberjack, in addition to occasional jobs playing music. An anonymous account published soon after his death states that in 1909 he worked at a factory manufacturing internal combustion engines; when the owner attempted to hire strikebreakers during a dispute, Hill is said to have encouraged the other workers to sabotage the machinery to halt operations.

In 1910, Hill traveled to Los Angeles, California, and then stayed for some time in the San Pedro district. While working as a longshoreman, he became associated with members of the Industrial Workers of the World (IWW, with members known as 'Wobblies'), an anarcho-syndicalist labor union which rejected the collaborationist approach of larger unions such as the American Federation of Labor (AFL), instead agitating militantly for "One Big Union" to support all workers against the bourgeoisie. Hill eventually became the secretary of the San Pedro IWW chapter. In late August 1910, Hill was in Portland, Oregon; while there, he wrote an article for the IWW magazine Industrial Worker about a hobo he had met in Pendleton, Oregon, who had been severely beaten by a police officer.

The Mexican Revolution broke out in 1910. Los Angeles, with a large Mexican diaspora, was a center of political organizing for the leftist Mexican Liberal Party against the rule of dictator Porfirio Díaz and later Francisco Madero. A group of IWW members joined the Magonista rebellion of 1911 and invaded Baja California, capturing Tijuana in early 1911 before being pushed back to the United States by the Mexican military in June. Hill denied participating in the rebellion in a 1915 statement to his attorney. However, several Wobblies later recounted fighting alongside him in Mexico. In a 1955 interview, former IWW member Sam Murray described a skirmish he had participated in alongside Hill: Hill and Murray were part of a group of 17 soldiers who had been sent south from Tijuana to scout for Federal troops. They were fired upon by a Federal advance force and held positions at a farmhouse and barn for about an hour before they were reinforced by John Mosby's forces; however, the Federal forces had several machine guns and far greater numbers, and eventually forced the insurrectionists to retreat to Tijuana. Hill later sneaked across the border into San Diego when Tijuana was overrun.

One IWW member later recalled Hill living at a beach shack in Hilo, Hawaii for several months, while they worked as longshoremen. This would match an account likely from his brother, who said Hill's "viking spirit" compelled him to travel between Los Angeles and Honolulu. The IWW was active in Hawaii during the 1910s, but it is unknown to what extent Hill participated in union organizing there.

=== Songwriting ===
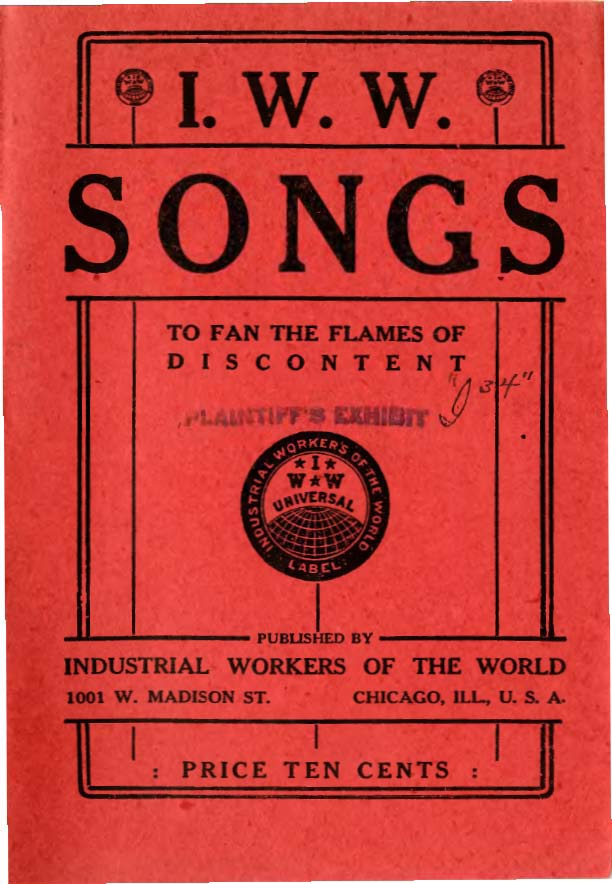
Cover of the 1919 edition of the Little Red Songbook

Labor radicals in the United States had a tradition of singing songs which exhorted their beliefs, compiled in books such as the 1901 Socialist Songs with Music. The IWW had a great number of poets and songwriters, and publicized their songs and poetry as a means to promote the class struggle. In 1909, the Spokane IWW chapter published a brochure containing radical songs. Organizer J. H. Walsh created a larger booklet based off this brochure, which circulated throughout the union as the Little Red Songbook, subtitled as songs "to fan the flames of discontent". Hill first contributed a song to this book for its 1911 third edition; this song, a satire of the Salvation Army entitled "The Preacher and the Slave", would become his most widely-reprinted song. Other IWW songwriters described "The Preacher and the Slave" as a key factor to the songbook's spread and popular appeal. After Hill became the most prominent IWW songwriter, he was sometimes erroneously credited with the creation of the book.

The fourth edition of the Songbook, published in 1912, featured four more songs by Hill, including "Casey Jones the Union Scab". The fifth edition the following year included nine more of his songs, including "There Is Power in a Union" and "The Tramp". A sixth edition, published only six months later, included four more Hill songs. In 1912, the Los Angeles IWW published its own songbook, possibly compiled by Hill, which featured only Hill songs, as well as Charles H. Kerr's translation of The Internationale, a popular left-wing anthem. This book also included the first of Hill's published cartoons.

In 1912, 8,000 workers on the Canadian Northern Railway participated in one of the largest of the IWW's strike actions, shutting down the railway along much of the Fraser River in British Columbia. Hill traveled north to the strike camp in Yale, where he wrote "Where the Fraser River Flows" alongside several other songs. He stayed at the camp for much of April, disappearing south after the camp was raided by the North-West Mounted Police.

Hill struggled to find longshoreman work in the aftermath of a strike and disputes between the IWW and the AFL. After staying in Los Angeles in the summer of 1913 with a friend who had fallen ill, he headed east. By mid-August 1913, he traveled, likely via boxcar, to Utah. He was seeking to earn money en route to Chicago. After stopping in Salt Lake City, potentially to visit a distant relative, he found work at the mining town of Park City. While employed at the Silver King Coalition mine in Park City alongside his friend Otto Appelquist, he fell ill for two weeks and was fired from his job. He stayed with Swedish families in the Salt Lake suburb of Sandy that December, performing Swedish songs on piano for them during the Christmas holiday season. In early January 1914, he and Appelquist were staying as guests for several nights at the house of the Swedish-American Eselius brothers in Murray.

== Murder case ==
On the night of January 10, 1914, Salt Lake City grocer John G. Morrison and his 17-year-old son Arling were shot and killed by two unknown men at their store. In the decade prior, Morrison had stopped two armed robberies by shooting at his assailants, and had for some time served as a member of the Salt Lake City Police Department; according to one police captain, he had expressed intense dread that one of his former arrestees would seek revenge on him. The Deseret News initially described the murder as a revenge killing. Morrison's younger son, the 13-year-old Merlin, witnessed the crime while hiding behind a shelf. Merlin gave multiple conflicting accounts of the event and the suspects, but maintained that after his father was shot, Arling grabbed a revolver and shot one of the men, before being shot multiple times and killed. Several trails of blood were found near the store, with one leading to a vacant lot, one to a nearby railroad, and one to a rail yard, where two spent revolver cartridges were found.

On the night of the murder, Hill departed from the house in Murray at some point between 6:00 and 9:00. At 11:30 that night, he visited the home of physician Frank McHugh, about 5 to 6 mi (8 to 10 km) from the site of the murder, claiming that he had been shot following an altercation with a friend who had accused him of insulting his wife. Upon examining Hill, McHugh found a bullet hole on the left side of his chest, alongside an exit hole on his back near the scapula. The bullet had grazed his left lung, causing some hemorrhaging. McHugh dressed his wound while McHugh's friend, Dr. A. A. Bird, arrived at the house, noticing that the light was on. While McHugh helped Hill put on his sweater jacket, a holstered handgun fell out of his pocket. McHugh placed the gun into the pocket of Hill's overcoat, which, unlike his other clothing, had no bullet holes.

After his wound was dressed, Hill requested to go home without going to the hospital. McHugh accepted this, later stating that if Hill had been able to walk to his office, he must have been in stable condition. Dr. Bird drove him to the Eselius house, arriving around 1 AM. They talked little on the ride. When Bird had to get out and crank the car's engine, Hill threw his gun out of the car window. Upon reaching the house, Hill told Bird to dim the car's headlights before he whistled twice as an apparent warning. Bird and Hill entered the house through the back, where they met the Eselius brothers and their nephews. According to one of the Eselius brothers, Appelquist woke up and talked with Hill after Bird departed. Appelquist then left the house, claiming to be looking for a job; he was never seen again.

=== Arrest ===
The police arrested multiple suspects following the murder. A pair of men were captured but later charged as suspects for an unrelated robbery in Arizona, while a restaurant helper was arrested near the store before being released. A young man who had been shot in the arm was arrested after he entered a police station: he claimed that he had been shot by two men in an unrelated incident and was also released. Morrison's widow reported that Morrison had a feud with two men in the neighborhood, and had told her that "If anything ever happens to me, you may have to look them up". Although she gave the police the men's names, the police never pursued them as a lead; the Deseret News later described them as respectable local business-owners. A news reporter later threatened to testify and reveal the names of these men during the trial, but the judge sustained an objection to this by the prosecuting attorney.

On January 12, McHugh, Bird, or both, reportedly contacted the Salt Lake City Police to accuse Hill as a suspect in the murders. Contemporary newspaper coverage named Bird as the informant. In an interview 30 years later, McHugh claimed that he had contacted the police after Hill had confessed to killing the Morrisons during an attempted robbery. However, McHugh gave no indication that Hill confessed while serving as a witness during the trial, and there is no evidence that the murderers were attempting a robbery.

Three Murray police officers arrived at the Eselius residence on January 13 to arrest Hill. They were shown to where Hill was lying down, weak from his wounds and under the effects of morphine. Hill made a motion with his hand upon the officers' entrance to the room, leading Police Chief Fred Peters to fire at him, narrowly missing his chest and shattering the knuckles of his right hand. Peters later claimed that Hill had leaped from bed and reached for a firearm, but no weapons or other connection to the crime was found at the residence, beyond Hill's bullet-ridden clothes. According to Hill's testimony, officers refused his request to be taken to a hospital and held him in a solitary cell for three or four days, attempting to get a confession.

Among the other major suspects was Frank Z. Wilson, an ex-convict who had been spotted leaning on a streetcar in Salt Lake, possibly injured or drunk. The police had initially informed the press that Hill was Wilson; after his true identity was made public, the police had halted its search for Wilson. After the arrest, The Salt Lake Tribune reported that the police were "elated over the capture of Hill, whom they feel certain is one of the men wanted for the murder". The police considered Appelquist to be Hill's likely accomplice, and offered a cash award for his capture. After conducting interviews about the case in the 1940s, scholar Aubrey Haan theorized that the police had killed Appelquist, potentially in an effort to frame Hill for the murder. Many of Hill's supporters believed that Appelquist had been the one to shoot Hill.

=== Trial ===
At his arraignment on January 27, Hill pleaded "not guilty". He chose to serve as his own attorney at his preliminary trial, saying he had no money to hire one. The preliminary hearing took place the following day. Hill was ineffective as his own counsel, asking only three questions of the twelve witnesses, one of whom he weakly cross-examined; a Salt Lake Herald Republican reporter described him as "letting them have it their own way" due to his belief in his innocence. The judge ruled there was sufficient evidence to warrant a full trial.

Hill made various public statements while awaiting trial, but avoided sharing information about his life. He refused a question about his birthplace, replying that he was a "citizen of the world and I was born on a planet called Earth", and that the location of his birth had no importance to the cause. Hill wrote that he had only been arrested once before, being held for thirty days in jail at San Pedro for vagrancy while supporting a dockworkers' strike. The chief of the San Pedro Police informed the police in Utah of Hill's IWW connections, saying that he was an alien, undesirable, and dangerous.

The trial began on June 17, 1914 at the Utah Third District Court, presided over by Judge Morris L. Ritchie. Jury selection for the trial took three days, and Hill's lawyers extensively questioned the possible jurors. Hill was only tried with the murder of John Morrison, as an accomplice had been alleged to have killed Arling. The exact course of trial proceedings is unclear and is mainly based off newspaper accounts, as the first volume of the case's court transcripts was lost by the Salt Lake County Clerk's office. Shortly after the preliminary trial, Hill was visited in jail by the lawyer E. D. McDougall, who volunteered to represent Hill pro bono. Another lawyer, F. B. Scott, later joined Hill's defense team. District Attorney Elmer O. Leatherwood served as the prosecuting attorney. On the third day of the trial, Hill attempted to discharge his defense attorneys in order to represent himself. Judge Ritchie allowed this, but declared that they could continue participating in the trial as amicus curiae. Scott said the following year that Hill would not have been convicted if they had continued to represent him.

The Salt Lake City IWW leaders William Chance and Ed Rowan talked with Hill soon after his arrest, and offered the legal support of the IWW; Hill stated that he did not want the union to become involved, and that he thought he would soon be released. However, when it became clear that he would stand trial for the murders, Rowan organized the Joe Hill Defense Committee and publicized the case in the April 1914 issue of the IWW newspaper Solidarity. One of Rowan's friends in Salt Lake, art instructor and socialist Virginia Snow Stephen (the daughter of Mormon leader Lorenzo Snow), became a major advocate for Hill's innocence; she contacted Orrin N. Hilton to work for the case, an attorney who had long represented mining unions. Hilton was initially unable to lead the defense, and recruited Salt Lake attorney Soren X. Christensen to serve as his associate for the case.

Throughout the trial, Hill maintained that he had been shot during an argument about a woman, but refused to identify her to protect her reputation. Contemporary press alongside some later scholars speculated that this "mystery woman" may have been Hill's friend Hilda Erickson, who he had been seen speaking to during trial recesses. In a 2011 Hill biography, writer William Adler publicized a letter from Erickson which stated that Appelquist had shot Hill in a romantic dispute over her.

The case went to the jury on June 26. During his instructions to the jury, Ritchie controversially dismissed the defense's request to caution the jury about circumstantial evidence. He compared the case to a cable, saying that if even a few wires were broken, the cable could still hold. The jury began deliberating at 4:20 PM, and adjourned for the night at 11:00. The following morning, they reached a guilty verdict. No demonstrations by Hill's supporters occurred after the verdict, against police expectations. Hill was sentenced to death on July 8 and given the option to be executed by hanging or firing squad; Hill chose the latter, saying "I have been shot a few times in the past and I guess I can stand it again."

=== Appeal and campaign for clemency ===
Hill's attorneys filed a motion for a new trial, claiming the state had failed to establish guilt beyond a reasonable doubt. Ritchie denied the motion on a September 1 hearing, leading the attorneys to file an appeal to the Utah Supreme Court. This postponed his initial execution, which had been set for September 4, 1914. Hilton and Christensen served as Hill's defense, noting that witnesses were not confident that Hill resembled the man who had shot Morrison, and describing the jury selection as inappropriate and the evidence as so circumstantial that the case should have been dismissed before it had come to a jury. Utah Attorney General A. R. Barnes argued on behalf of the state, arguing that sufficient evidence had been reached for the case to be brought to a jury.

As the Supreme Court could not weigh evidence or facts from the case, only the manner in which the trial was conducted, it was unable to consider many of the defense's points or grant a new trial. On July 3, 1915, it ruled against the allegations of misconduct in the trial, with Chief Justice Daniel N. Straup writing that Hill "had a fair and impartial trial in which he was granted every right and privilege vouchsafed by the law". Hill and many of his supporters called for the case to be appealed to the Supreme Court of the United States, but his attorneys never filed an appeal, likely believing that the case had no federal considerations.

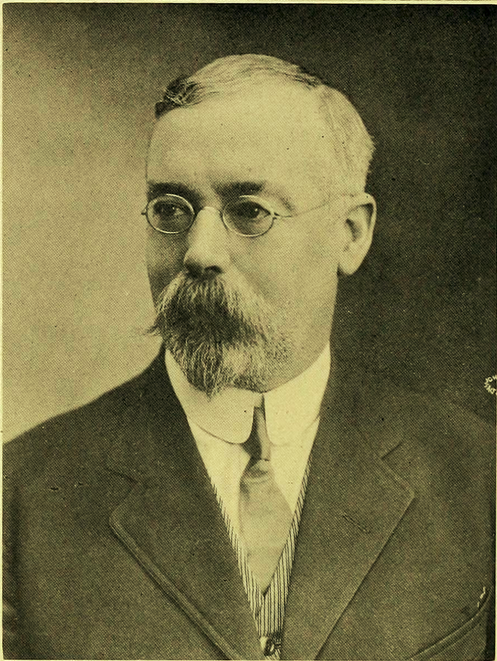
Utah governor William Spry refused to pardon Hill's death sentence.

Following the failed appeal, Hill's supporters began a letter writing campaign to urge Utah governor William Spry to commute Hill's death sentence, due to the circumstantial nature of the evidence. Prominent figures including AFL leader Samuel Gompers and Swedish diplomat August Ekengren signed on to this call for clemency. On August 2, 1915, Ritchie set October 1 as Hill's execution date. On September 30, Hill wrote a letter to the editor of Solidarity as a "last, fond farewell to all true rebels", where he humorously stated that "tomorrow I expect to make a trip to the planet Mars and, if so, will immediately commence to organize the Mars canal workers into the I.W.W."

IWW organizer Elizabeth Gurley Flynn traveled to Washington, D.C. on September 29, and urged President Woodrow Wilson's secretary Joseph P. Tumulty to have Wilson issue a pardon for Hill's execution. On Tumulty's request, Hill's former attorney Scott telegraphed to say that there was "Absolutely no evidence connecting Hillstrom with murder" except for the bullet wounds, but that "Hillstrom fanatically makes no attempt to save his life".

Ekengren urged Wilson to delay the execution to allow him time to submit more evidence for a pardon, leading Wilson to telegraph Spry and ask for a delay of the execution, noting that Hill was a Swedish subject. Spry agreed to postpone the execution until the next meeting of the Utah Board of Pardons on October 16. However, he insisted to Wilson that Hill was guilty and had been given a fair trial, later telling press that the President interfering with a state execution was unheard of. The IWW campaign ramped up in the following week, with many Utah officials being subject to frequent protests. Protests for Hill's life were also held at the Panama–Pacific International Exposition.

Hill wrote a statement shortly before his initial execution date, which was published on October 4 under the title "A Few Reasons Why I Demand A New Trial". He reaffirmed his innocence, writing that his bullet wounds could not have matched the trajectories of a bullet fired by Arling Morrison. Convinced by Hill's statement, Ekengren considered traveling to Utah to meet with the Board of Pardons, but Hilton convinced him to stay, explaining that the Utah officials would never be convinced to pardon Hill without new evidence. The two drafted a letter to Wilson calling on him to commute Hill's sentence. Wilson was sympathetic, and attempted to convince the Utah authorities not to execute Hill. However, the Utah government rebuked him, and he wrote that he had no official jurisdiction to overrule them. On October 18, the state set a new execution date of November 19.

Hilton and Ekengren continued to campaign for Hill's life. Letter-writing campaigns and protests circulated widely, targeting both Spry and Wilson. The campaign gained the support of various Swedish-American societies, the AFL, the United Hebrew Trades (a Jewish-American labor union), the International Longshoremen's Association, and local chapters of the Socialist Party. Wilson reiterated to the campaigners that he had no power to halt the execution, but on November 17 again contacted Spry and asked him to reconsider the case. Most newspapers in Utah were strongly against the IWW and attempts to stay the execution, proclaiming that the IWW intended to invade the state, assassinate Spry, and free Hill. Spry immediately rejected Wilson's second call for clemency, writing that Hill was among the "perpetrators of one of the most atrocious murders ever committed in the state" and that Wilson's actions had only granted the case "undue importance".

While imprisoned, Hill spent much of his time writing letters, mainly concerning the IWW. He wrote an article for the International Socialist Review in 1914, calling for the systematic use of strikes and sabotage to "take the child slaves out of the mills and the sweatshops and give their unemployed fathers a chance to work". He wrote a letter to the editor in Solidarity in November 1914, bemoaning the union's lack of effort to recruit female workers, writing that they were "more exploited than men" and "not lacking in militant and revolutionary spirit". Along with many other IWW members, he corresponded with child activist Katie Phar, one possible inspiration for his song "The Rebel Girl".

=== Analysis ===
Subsequent opinions are divided on Hill's guilt, and on the fairness of his trial. Several commentators have described the trial as a frameup. Labor historian Philip S. Foner wrote that "the police department and the press had found Joe Hill guilty long before the trial date approached". Poet Franklin Rosemont called the trial a "judicial murder", saying it was filled with "grotesque violations of judicial procedure". In contrast, historian Gibbs Smith wrote there was no evidence of a conspiracy to frame Hill. But Smith also believed the trial was unfair, and said any homeless migrant facing a murder trial during the period could have faced a similar legal process. Smith said from available evidence it was impossible to verify whether Hill was guilty or innocent.

In contrast, labor historian Vernon H. Jensen wrote: "it is clear that Hillstrom had a proper trial" in a 1951 article. Historian and novelist Wallace Stegner shared a similar position earlier in a 1948 article for The New Republic, who pronounced him "probably guilty". The IWW condemned Stegner's article as libelous and picketed The New Republic offices.

Hill's biographer William Adler believes Hill was entirely innocent of any involvement in the Morrison murders, and attributes Hill's refusal to testify to a desire to protect Hilda Erickson. Utah historian Thomas G. Alexander, writing in 1978, described Hill as the likely perpetrator, but also said it was probably difficult for Hill to get a fair trial due to negative publicity.

== Execution ==
On November 18, 1915, the day before his execution, Hill rejected an offer of seeing a minister—saying that he had already made peace with death—and held a press conference with a group of four reporters. Hill refused questions about the circumstance of his gunshot wound, saying he was "not here to satisfy public curiosity", while stating that he held "no hard feelings" about his execution, other than that he believed he had been given an unfair trial. When asked what his death would result in, he replied "it won't do the IWW any harm, and it won't do the State of Utah any good."

He wrote two telegrams to prominent IWW organizer Bill Haywood, writing "don't waste any time in mourning—organize", a statement later shortened to a common radical slogan "Don't Mourn, Organize". He also requested his body to be removed from the state, writing "I don't want to be caught dead in Utah". To labor leader Elizabeth Gurley Flynn, he sent a telegram thanking and telling her to "be sure to locate a few more Rebel Girls like yourself, because they are needed and needed badly". About 10:00 PM, Hill handed a prison guard a poem entitled "My Last Will":

My will is easy to decide
For there is nothing to divide
My kin don't need to fuss and moan
"Moss does not cling to a rolling stone."
My body? -Oh! -If I could choose
I would to ashes it reduce
And let the merry breezes blow
My dust to where some flowers grow.
Perhaps some fading flower then
Would come to life and bloom again.
This is my Last and Final Will.
Good luck to All of you
-Joe Hill

Diagram of Hill's execution, published by the Cleveland Press in November 1915

During that night, the Seattle chapter of the IWW made various attempts to stay the execution. They sent telegrams to Spry and Wilson asking for it to be delayed, including an allegation by a man named William Busky, who claimed that he had been with Hill the night of the murder, and that he could not have committed it. Nothing resulted from any of these attempts.

According to newspaper accounts, Hill awoke at 5:00 AM on November 19, and attempted to barricade his cell door using his blanket and a mattress. As the prison guards attempted to open the door, Hill grabbed a sharpened half of a broom handle and jabbed at the guards. When a guard broke another broom and jabbed at Hill's stomach in an attempt to force him back, Hill grabbed it and began hitting the guards with both sticks. According to the Salt Lake Herald Republican, both guards were bloodied in the combat, but the fighting ceased when Sheriff John Corless arrived to take Hill to the execution yard. Corless chastised Hill for fighting, to which he responded "Well I'm through, but you can't blame a man for fighting for his life." Adler disputes these accounts, writing that it would be unlikely for Hill to have been able to barricade his cell without being noticed by guards. The alleged skirmish led to Hill being denied his original request for his execution—that he be allowed to die in his own clothes, without a blindfold.

At about 7:30 AM, Hill was led out to the prison yard, blindfolded, where the firing squad had assembled in a covered room. The IWW members Hill had invited to watch the execution were denied entry, leaving only law enforcement from various parts of Utah in attendance. Hill spoke briefly as the squad prepared, yelling "Let it go, fire!" immediately before he was shot.

=== Funeral and aftermath ===
Thousands of spectators came to view Hill's body at a small funerary chapel in Salt Lake over the following days. The local IWW leaders attempted to find a larger space to hold a funeral, but no venue could be found. A service was held on the 21st, where speakers read Hill's poems and sang radical songs. According to his wishes, Hill's casket was loaded on a train to Chicago. It arrived two days later, where Haywood and a group of local IWW members took the body to a small chapel. On November 25, Thanksgiving, speeches and songs were performed at the West Side Auditorium in his honor, before an IWW local led a mile-long funeral procession of Hill's casket to a nearby railway station, singing Hill's songs to a crowd of around 30,000 spectators. The casket was taken to the Chicago Graceland Cemetery, where IWW members gave eulogies in various languages. Hill's body was cremated the following day.

On the first anniversary of Hill's execution, the IWW held its annual conference at the West Side Auditorium. Haywood distributed 600 packets containing portions of Hill's ashes to attendees, including international delegates, and tasked them to scatter them into the wind across the world. Hill's ashes were scattered across five continents—all except Africa and Antarctica—and across each of the lower 48 states except (according to his wishes) Utah. As the IWW and the American labor movement came under attack by law enforcement and vigilantes in 1916 and 1917, many packets of Hill's ashes were seized and destroyed. One envelope containing some of his ashes was rediscovered in the 1980s, which were then scattered at IWW events.

Hill's execution led to condemnations and statements of resolve by various socialist and anarchist organizations, although many expressed shock and sadness at the events. Margaret C. Anderson, the editor of literary magazine The Little Review, wrote an editorial in outrage over the execution, asking "Why didn't someone shoot the Governor of Utah before he could shoot Joe Hill? For God's sake, why doesn't someone start the revolution?"

In contrast, press coverage was largely supportive of the execution, with the Deseret News proclaiming that "the law has been enforced and justice has been satisfied". The IWW was subject to crackdowns in Salt Lake following the execution, with Spry stating that "we did our duty with Joe Hillstrom, and we expect to do it with his lawless colleagues that have recently infested the city." Hilton was disbarred in Utah in 1916, under charges that he had defamed Spry and the Utah legal system by alleging that they were under the influence of the Church of Latter-day Saints.

== Legacy ==
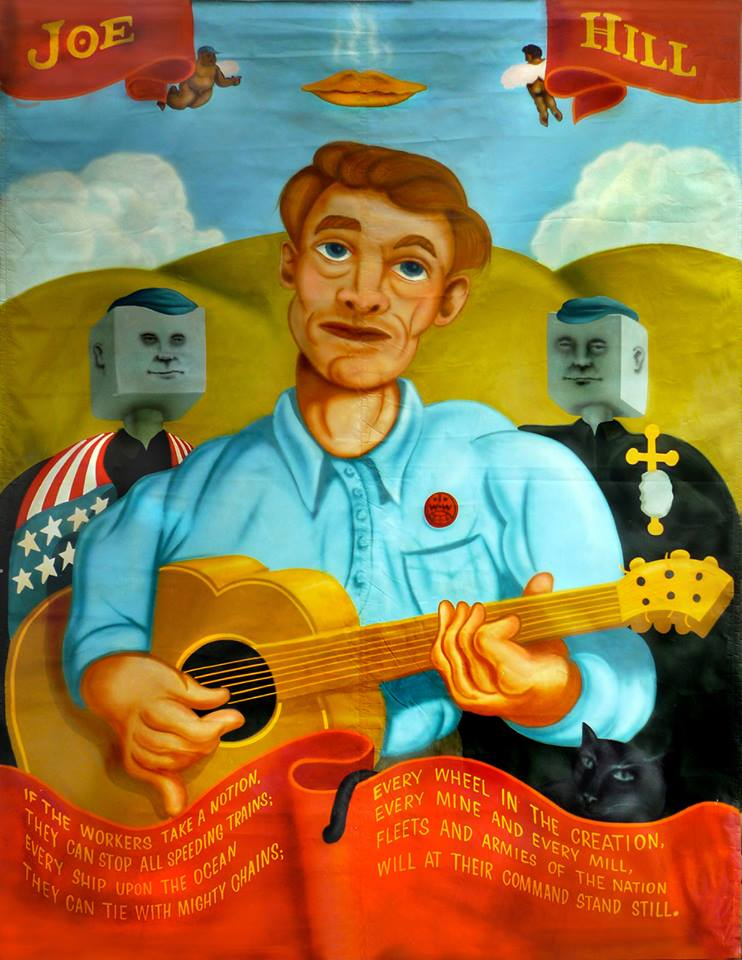
1992 mural commemorating Hill by Mike Alewitz

Hill's life and execution became a folk legend spread through songs and writing, becoming far more widely known than the rest of the IWW within popular culture. Literary theorist Thomas Marvin writes that the IWW promoted the image of Hill as a martyr, noting that the popularity of his songs and his well-articulated calls for organizing while imprisoned helped this narrative emerge. Many mainstream publications attempted to disrupt this perspective by mocking the IWW; The New York Times coverage of Hill's funeral described the mourners as "bums and hoboes" of whom "less than ten percent were American".

Various radical, socialist, and communist movements have used Hill as a symbol, leading IWW cartoonist Ralph Chaplin to write that "Joe Hill was no more a Communist than he was a murderer. He was an I.W.W." John Dos Passos' 1932 novel Nineteen Nineteen, Upton Sinclair's 1924 play Singing Jailbirds, and Carl Sandburg's 1936 long poem The People, Yes contain tributes to Hill, contributing to the growth of his story as a folk legend. IWW artist Carlos Cortez created a linocut poster honoring Hill in 1979. In 1961, Catholic Worker Movement organizer Ammon Hennacy established a house of hospitality in Salt Lake City named for Hill, the Joe Hill House.

Hill was memorialized in songs soon after his death by IWW musicians such as T-Bone Slim and Dick Brazier. Around 1932, Alfred Hayes wrote a memorial poem entitled "I Dreamed I Saw Joe Hill Last Night". Several years later, folk singer Earl Robinson set this to music as a song titled "Joe Hill". Boosted in popularity by notable performers such as Paul Robeson and Joan Baez, it spread internationally; in 1983, folk music scholar Sam Richards described it as "conceivably the best known industrial or political song in the British trade union and Labour movement".

Later generations of leftist American musicians were strongly influenced by Hill. Singer-songwriter Woody Guthrie wrote a prose poem in the 1940s entitled "Joe Hillstrom" about Hill's trial and murder, while later musicians such as Phil Ochs honored Hill with songs. Bob Dylan cited Hill's legend as an influence in his 2004 memoir. Hill's depictions in popular fiction often depict him as an ambiguous figure with both criminal and benevolent tendencies, such as James Stevens's 1948 novel Big Jim Turner or less charitably in Stegner's 1950 The Preacher and the Slave.

=== In Sweden ===
For decades after his execution, the primary account of Hill's life was a 1923 article by Ralph Chaplin, mainly based off interviews with John Holland, a man claiming to be Hill's cousin; this informant was later identified by Hill's sister Ester as their older brother Paul. Further information on Hill's early life was discovered and published by Swedish researchers, including socialist activist Ture Nerman, during the late 1940s and 1950s.

Hill became a commemorated figure among the Swedish labor movement. Although he was unknown in Sweden during his life, both Swedish writers and the German syndicalist Augustin Souchy, published memorials about him in the 1910s and 1920s. The Stockholm branch of the IWW published Swedish translations of some of his songs in 1924, later expanded into the Skandinavisk sångbok by the Scandinavian labor movement in Seattle. In 1971, director Bo Widerberg released a biopic on Hill's life, and a 1979 Swedish postage stamp honored his 100th birthday. His childhood home in Gävle now serves as a house museum and union organizing center.

== Songs and other work ==
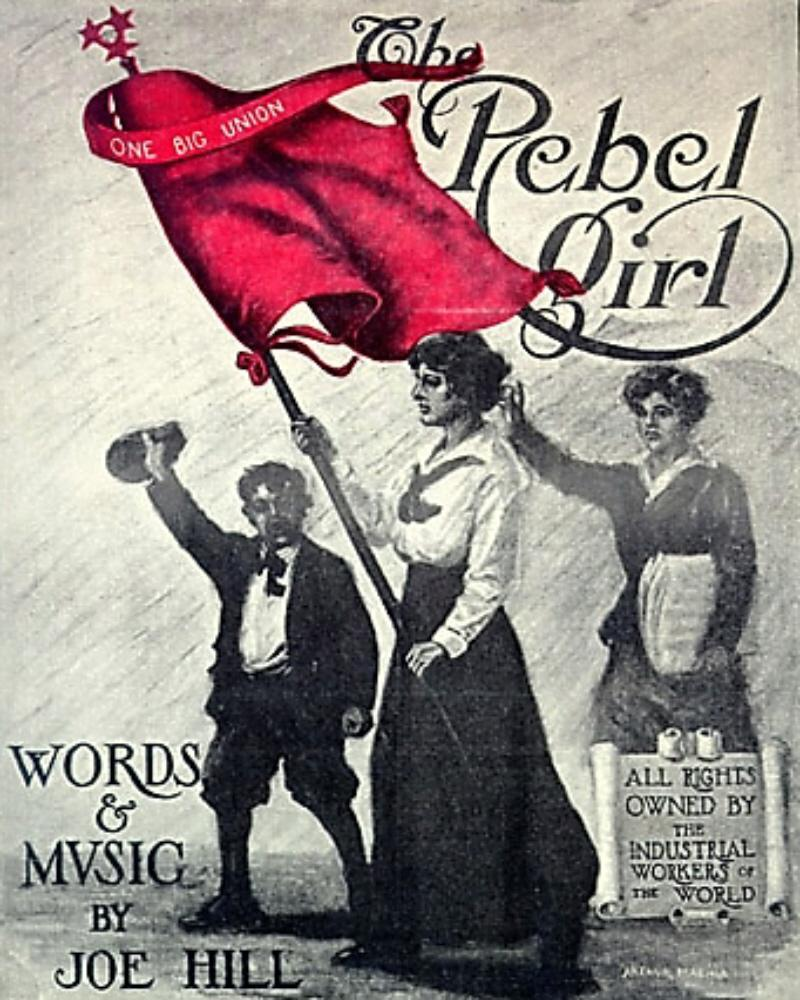
Sheet music cover for "The Rebel Girl", a 1915 song by Hill

Twenty-four of Hill's songs were published in IWW material, including 20 in the Little Red Songbook. He was the largest individual contributor for the songbook, as most other songs were either of unknown origins or contributed by uncredited workers. Hill's songs were generally distributed as lyrics alone, to be sung to the tunes of widely-known hymns, popular songs, and show tunes. However, "Workers of the World, Awaken!" and "The Rebel Girl" were written to original melodies. Hill saw his music as a means to build class consciousness and win over workers that may otherwise be uninterested in IWW literature. In response to a 1914 debate over music's role as a means to radicalize the working class, Hill wrote:

A pamphlet, no matter how good, is never read more than once, but a song is learned by heart and repeated over and over, and I maintain that if a person can put a few cold, common sense facts into a song, and dress them up in a cloak of humor to take the dryness off of them, he will succeed in reaching a great number of workers who are too unintelligent or too indifferent to read a pamphlet or an editorial on economic science.

Hill's songs were known for their humor and biting satire, and were written with simple lyrics in the tradition of contemporary folk songs. Many of his songs mocked those who supported their bosses as dimwitted and oblivious to their oppression, while "Preacher and the Slave" portrayed the Salvation Army as hypocrites. One song, "A Little Talk With Golden" attacked the AFL trade unionist John Golden for his attempts to break an IWW-backed strike. Many of Hill's songs contained an inspirational political message in their final verse. They were intended to be sung by audiences as a group activity, rather than by individual performers.

As Hill frequently improvised songs, many were never written down. Historian Fred Thompson noted fragments of three additional songs during a 1967 interview with a former IWW activist, each written for the 1912 Canadian Northern Railroad Company strike. Three non-political love songs written by him are also known; two were found with his possessions when he was arrested, while the third was found in the archives of the Swedish Ministry for Foreign Affairs. A song of his entitled "A Trip to Honolulu" was discovered in 2001, uniquely containing sheet music, but no lyrics.

The songs gained popularity across the United States during the early 1910s, widely sung at labor actions and hobo camps. Several of his songs, such as "There Is Power in a Union" and "The Preacher and the Slave", remain popular among American labor movements, described by Rosemont as "labor and revolutionary 'standards'". Hill's works have been included in a wide variety of labor and folk song collections, including in the songbooks of the AFL-CIO, the modern successor to the AFL. During the 1930s, some musicians associated with the Communist Party of the United States rejected Hill as lacking proper class consciousness due to his background as a lumpenproletarian (in Marxist thought, a member of the lowest stratum of society). Communist writer and playwright Mike Gold called for a "Communist Joe Hill", bemoaning the lack of a cultural equivalent to the Wobbly songwriters, and characterizing the practice of rewriting hymns as inferior to the creation of a separate proletarian musical tradition. Hill's songs have been covered by a wide variety of later musicians, including Billy Bragg, Hazel Dickens, Ani DiFranco, Joe Glazer, Tom Glazer, Cisco Houston, Faith Petric, Utah Phillips, and Pete Seeger.

=== Cartoons and paintings ===
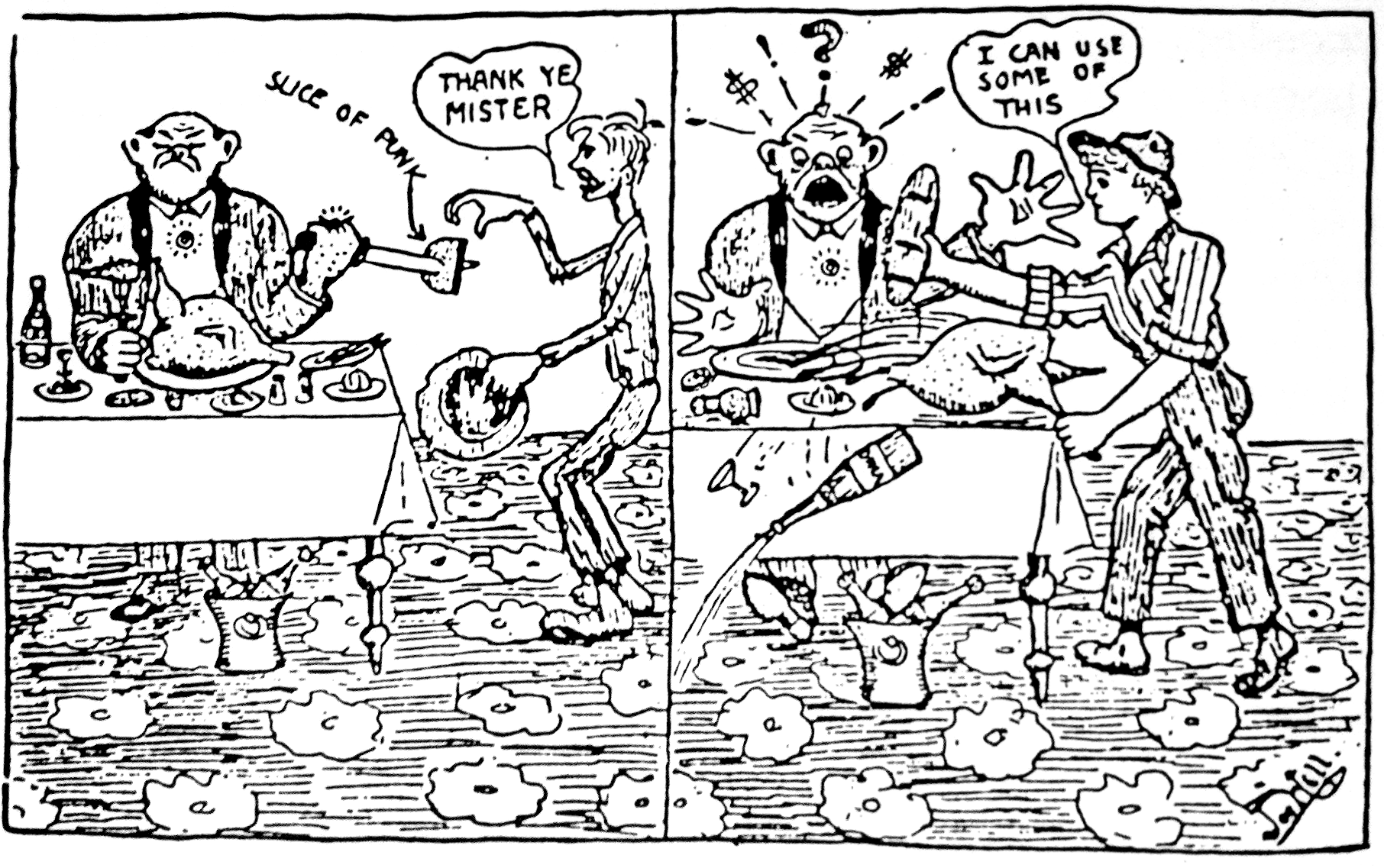
"As It Was, As It Is", one of Hill's comic strips published after his death.

Since childhood, Hill enjoyed drawing cartoons, or as he termed it, "scribbling". He began drawing cartoons for IWW publications in 1912. Unlike many other cartoonists associated with the American labor movement, Hill eschewed the style of typical political cartoons in favor of the less grounded and comedic styles in conventional newspaper comics. He made frequent use of slapstick gags and avoided large amounts of text. Like with his music, he used his cartoons as a medium to criticize the capitalist system and call for revolution. Many of his comics feature workers taking action or expropriating wealth, and misfortune befalling capitalists.

Hill noted that he enjoyed painting in his spare time, alongside composing music and songwriting. Only one painting confirmed to be made by Hill survives, an oil painting of a bridge and waterfall by the ironworks outside his hometown of Gävle. It is now held by Gävle's Joe Hill Museum. A landscape oil painting featuring boats on a lake overlooking snow-capped mountains, signed with the name "Joe U.S.", may be Hill's creation.
