= Little Red Songbook =

Song book by Industrial Workers of the World

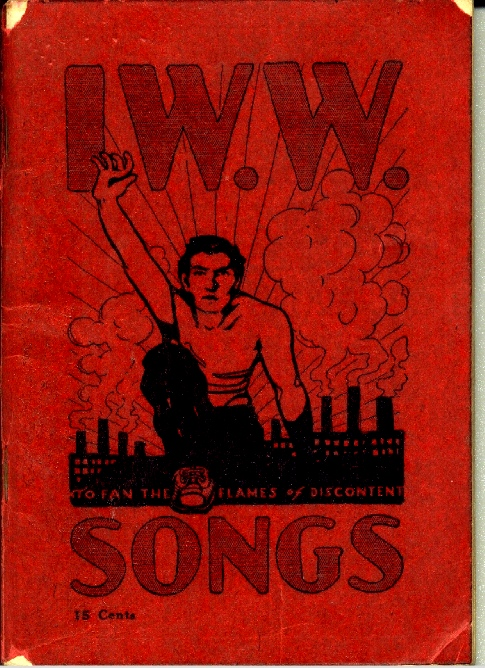
The Little Red Songbook

The Little Red Songbook is a collection of songs related to the international trade union the Industrial Workers of the World first published in 1909. Its self-declared purpose is to "fan the flames of discontent" and build support for the union and labour movement as a whole. It usually features old folk songs and hymns with new lyrics, along with music written expressly for the labor movement.

== Industrial Workers of the World ==
The Industrial Workers of the World (IWW), whose members are nicknamed "Wobblies", is an international labor union founded in Chicago in 1905. The nickname's origin is uncertain. Its ideology combines general unionism with industrial unionism, as it is a general union, subdivided between the various industries which employ its members. The philosophy and tactics of the IWW are described as "revolutionary industrial unionism", with ties to socialist, syndicalist, and anarchist labor movements.

== History ==
The Little Red Songbook was first published by a committee of IWW members in Spokane in 1909. It was originally titled Songs of the Workers, on the Road, in the Jungles, and in the Shops—Songs to Fan the Flames of Discontent. It includes songs written by Joe Hill, Harry McClintock (Spellbinder), Ralph Chaplin, T-Bone Slim, and others. The early editions contained many of the most well-known labor songs, such as "The Red Flag," "The Internationale," "The Preacher and the Slave," and "Solidarity Forever." Thirty-eight editions were published between 1909 and 2010.

A Canadian I.W.W. Songbook, compiled and edited by Jerzy (George) Dymny, featuring 41 songs with a Canadian slant was published in 1990.

An edition commemorating the centennial of the IWW's founding in 1905 was published in 2005 and given as an advance copy to attendees of the centenary concert, "Fan the Flames of Discontent". The latest edition of the Little Red Songbook was printed in 2010.

The 190 different songs included in the Little Red Songbook between 1909 and 1973 are collected and annotated in The Big Red Songbook, edited by Archie Green, David Roediger, and Franklin Rosemont and published in 2007.

In 2023, a call was put out by the Industrial Worker for songs to be included in a 39th edition.

== List of songs ==
This is a list of songs featured in the 36th edition, subtitled the International Edition

Song title	Tune
"A Las Barricadas"	
"A World To Win"	
"All Used Up"	
"Aragon Mill"	
"Aristocracy Forever"	"Solidarity Forever"
"Babylon Updated"	"Babylon is Fallen"
"Banks of Marble"	
"The Blackleg Miner"	
"The Boss's Darling"	
"Box Factory"	
"Bread and Roses"	
"Buy This American Car"	
"Capitalism's Endless Chain"	
"Casey Jones, the Union Scab"	
"Christians At War"	"Onward, Christian Soldiers"
"Commonwealth of Toil"	
"Cotton Mill Girls"	
"Down At The Picketline"	
"Drill, Ye Tamers, Drill"	
"Dump the Bosses Off Your Back"	"Take it To The Lord In Prayer"
"Ella's Song"	
"Fight Like Hell"	
"Food Not Finance"	
"Forget Me Not"	
"Freedom Road"	
"Give Back My Factory To Me"	"My Bonnie Lies over the Ocean"
"Give Me That New Union Contract"	
"Giving Nothing Back"	
"Go, I Will Send Thee"	"Children, Go Where I Send Thee"
"Go to Work on Monday"	
"Hallelujah, I'm a Bum"	"Revive us Again"
"Hijos del Pueblo"	
"High Tech"	
"Hold the Fort"	
"If It Weren't For The Union"	
"I'm Dreaming of a Fair Contract"	"White Christmas"
"The Internationale"	
"Joe Hill"	"John Hardy"
"Joe Hill's Last Will"	
"Labor's Endless Chain"	
"Landlord and Tenant"	
"Larimer Street"	
"Legal- Illegal"	
"Links on the Chain"	
"LIP Song"	
"Lumberjack's Prayer"	
"The Men of Kemira"	
"Mexican Revolutionary Song"	
"Mr. Block"	"It Looks To Me Like a Big Time Tonight"
"Moderation"	
"The New America"	
"Nine to Five Song"	"M.T.A."
"No Nos Moveran"	
"Not So Long Ago"	
"Old Ma Bell"	"The Old Gray Mare"
"On The Picket Line"	"Polly Wolly Doodle"
"One More Day Than Them"	
"Outa Work Blues"	
"Popular Wobbly"	"They Go Wild, Simply Wild, Over Me"
"Porque Los Pobres No Tienen"	
"Potter Valley Mill"	
"Public Workers Stand Together"	"A Miner's Life"
"Put It On the Ground"	
"Rise Again"	
"Rob A Train"	
"Rock-a-bye Baby"	
"Roll the Hours Back"	"Rock Around the Clock"
"Roll the Union On"	
"Scabs"	
"So Long Partner"	
"Solidaridad pa' Siempre"	
"Solidarity Forever"	"John Brown's Body"
"Song of My Da"	
"Soul Stealers"	
"Stand United, All You Workers"	"Jesus Loves the Little Children"
"Star- Spangled George Bush"	"The Star-Spangled Banner"
"Staying Out On The Line"	"This Little Light of Mine"
"Stung Right"	
"There Is Power in a Union (Billy Bragg)"	"Battle Cry of Freedom"
"There Is Power in the Union (Joe Hill)"	"There is Power in the Blood"
"This Little Scab"	"This Old Man"
"The Four Hour Day"	"Old Black Joe"
"The Picket Boogie"	"Hokey Pokey"
"The Preacher and the Slave"	"In the Sweet By-and-Bye"
"The Scabs Crawl In"	"The Worms Crawl In"
"The Union Buster"	"Oh! Susanna"
"Union Maid"	"Red Wing"
"Universal Housewife"	"Universal Soldier"
"V.D.T."	
"We Are Building A Strong Union"	"Jacob's Ladder"
"We Have Fed You All For A Thousand Years"	
"We Shall Not Be Moved"	"I Shall Not Be Moved"
"We Shall Not Give Up The Fight"	
"What Is a Boss?"	
"What Is a Scab?"	
"Where Are We Gonna Work?"	
"Which Side Are You On?"	"Lay the Lily Low"
"Who Bombed Judi Bari?"	
"Winnsboro Cotton Mill Blues"	
"Wobbly Doxology"	
"Work Rap Song"	
"The World Turned Upside Down"	
"Workers' Control Song"	
"Workingfolk Unite"	
"You Gotta Go Down"	"Lonesome valley"

== Bibliography ==
- IWW Songs – to Fan the Flames of Discontent: A Reprint of the Nineteenth Edition (1923) of the Famous Little Red Song Book. Chicago: Charles H. Kerr Publishing Co., 2003. ISBN 0-88286-189-1
- Songs of the Workers to Fan the Flames of Discontent: The Little Red Songbook. Limited Centenary Concert Edition. Philadelphia: Industrial Workers of the World, June 2005.
- Archie Green, David Roediger, Franklin Rosemont, and Salvatore Salerno, eds., The Big Red Songbook. Chicago: Charles H. Kerr Publishing Co., 2007. ISBN 0-88286-277-4
- Canadian I.W.W. Songbook, compiled and edited by Jerzy (George) Dymny. Toronto, Ontario: Industrial Workers of the World, May 1, 1990.
