= Dave Tucker (geologist) =

American geologist and author

David Samuel Tucker is a geologist and union organizer in Washington state. He is a research associate at Western Washington University, and formerly served as an instructor at North Cascades Institute, and the director of the Mount Baker Volcano Research Center (now closed). He writes the blog Northwest Geology Field Trips, a blog aimed at laypeople detailing where to find interesting geology in the Pacific Northwest. In 2015, he published a popular book on Washington geology, Geology Underfoot in Western Washington. He resides in Bellingham, Washington. In the 1980s he worked as a mountaineering guide in the Cascades, Mexico, and South America.

== Education ==
Tucker is a graduate of Western Washington University: 1974 (B.S. in environmental science) and 2004 (M.S. in geology).

== Geology research ==
Tucker's geologic research focuses on volcanic rocks in the Mount Baker region in the northwestern portion of the North Cascades. Tucker obtained a master's degree in geology at Western Washington University in 2004. His thesis mapped and described the previously little known and undefined Hannegan caldera, including geochemistry of related rocks. The 3.72-million-year-old Hannegan caldera is in North Cascades National Park a few miles northeast of Mount Shuksan. The caldera is 8x3.5 km in area. Tucker estimated the erupted volume at around 140 km^{3} of rhyolite magma. The caldera is traversed by trails to Hannegan Pass, Copper Ridge, and the Chilliwack River. Ruth Mountain, Icy Peak and Hannegan Peak are the dominant geographic features in the caldera.

Tucker assisted U.S. Geological Survey geologist Wes Hildreth in field work that resulted in the first detailed geologic map of Mount Baker. He also collaborated with USGS geologist Kevin M. Scott to characterize Holocene eruption history at Mount Baker, including formation of Sherman Crater, eruption of volcanic ash (tephras) and lahars. Their research culminated in a 2020 USGS Professional Paper.

A focus of research has been a description of the entrance of the Sulphur Creek lava flow into Glacial Lake Baker 9800 years ago. Tucker has also collaborated on studies of Mount Baker glaciers.

From 2007 to 2013, Tucker led teams of volunteers to Sherman Crater at 9500 feet on the south flank of Mount Baker to collect fumarole gas samples for a USGS study of hazards and potential activity at Mount Baker. He also led a team that made an ice-radar transect to reveal the thickness of ice filling the 12,000- year-old Carmelo Crater at the summit plateau of Mount Baker.

In 2012, Tucker, George Mustoe, and Keith Kemplin published a paper that described the fossil footprints believed to belong to Gastornis, also known as Diatryma, a giant flightless bird in the Eocene Chuckanut Formation of Whatcom County. The track, preserved in a large sandstone slab, was found in the 2009 Racehorse Creek landslide. It was preserved by a volunteer team coordinated by Tucker and flown off the mountainside using a large helicopter to Western Washington University's Geology Department.

In 2024 and 2025, Tucker was interviewed by Nick Zentner on the topic of calderas in the Cascades. Tucker's previous work in this area includes research into the age and locations of other Cascades calderas.

== Union involvement ==
Tucker has been a member of the Industrial Workers of the World since 1981, and in union circles uses the nickname "Tuck". He served as the General Secretary-Treasurer in the union's Chicago headquarters in 1983, and several terms on the General Executive Board, most recently in 2017–2019. He is the current secretary and treasurer of the Whatcom–Skagit IWW branch. He has been a mentee to Carlos Cortez and Fred W. Thompson.

In 1983, while serving as the IWW general secretary, Tucker, alongside Thompson, was interviewed by Dennis Wholey on the PBS LateNight television program.

Tuck is an expert on the history and culture of unions in Washington and North America, and is a specific expert on the Everett massacre and the Centralia tragedy; he has organized commemorative demonstrations at the sites of these events.

In 2024, Tuck was a speaker at the dedication of Union Victims, a monument erected in Centralia, Washington, to honor victims of the tragedy. He had previously been involved with the Centralia Monument Committee, and on Armistice Day in 2023 had hosted an informational event about the monument.

== Geologic publications ==
- Housen BA, Beck ME Jr, Burmester RF, Fawcett T, Petro G, Sargent R, Addis K, Curtis K, Ladd J, Liner N, Molitor B, Montgomery T, Mynatt I, Palmer B, Tucker D, White I (April 2003). "Paleomagnetism of the Mt. Stuart Batholith Revisited Again: What Has Been Learned Since 1972?". American Journal of Science. 303 (4): 263–299. Bibcode:2003AmJS..303..263H. doi:10.2475/ajs.303.4.263.
- Tucker, David S. (2006). "Geologic Map of the Pliocene Hannegan Caldera, North Cascades, Washington". Geological Society of America Digital Maps. doi:10.1130/2006.dmch003.
- Stelling, Pete; Tucker, David S. (2007). Floods, Faults, and Fire. Geological Society of America. doi:10.1130/9780813700090. ISBN 978-0-8137-5609-7.
  - Tucker, David S.; Scott, Kevin M.; Lewis, David R. (2007). "Field guide to Mount Baker volcanic deposits in the Baker River valley: Nineteenth century lahars, tephras, debris avalanches, and early Holocene subaqueous lava" (PDF). Geological Society of America. 9: 83–98. doi:10.1130/2007.fld009(04). ISBN 978-0-8137-0009-0. S2CID 56436105. ResearchGate 284444919.
- Tucker, D.; Hildreth, W.; Ullrich, T.; Friedman, R. (2007). "Geology and complex collapse mechanisms of the 3.72 Ma Hannegan caldera, North Cascades, Washington, USA". Geological Society of America Bulletin. 119 (3–4): 329–342. Bibcode:2007GSAB..119..329T. doi:10.1130/b25904.1. ISSN 0016-7606. S2CID 128417330. ResearchGate 249527328 USGS 70032860.
  - Tucker, D.; et al. (2007). "Supplemental material: Geology and complex collapse mechanisms of the 3.72 Ma Hannegan caldera, North Cascades, Washington, USA". Geological Society of America Data Repository. doi:10.1130/2007008.
- Tucker, David S. (2008). "Two-phase, reciprocal, double trapdoor collapse at Hannegan caldera, North Cascades, Washington, USA". IOP Conference Series: Earth and Environmental Science. 3 (1) 012011. Bibcode:2008E&ES....3a2011T. doi:10.1088/1755-1307/3/1/012011. ISSN 1755-1315. S2CID 250683520.
- Tucker, David S.; Scott, Kevin M. (2009). "Structures and facies associated with the flow of subaerial basaltic lava into a deep freshwater lake: The Sulphur Creek lava flow, North Cascades, Washington". Journal of Volcanology and Geothermal Research. 185 (4): 311–322. Bibcode:2009JVGR..185..311T. doi:10.1016/j.jvolgeores.2008.11.028. ISSN 0377-0273.
- Werner, C.; Evans, W. C.; Poland, M.; Tucker, D. S.; Doukas, M. P. (2009). "Long-term changes in quiescent degassing at Mount Baker Volcano, Washington, USA; Evidence for a stalled intrusion in 1975 and connection to a deep magma source". Journal of Volcanology and Geothermal Research. 186 (3): 379–386. Bibcode:2009JVGR..186..379W. doi:10.1016/j.jvolgeores.2009.07.006. ISSN 0377-0273.
- Scurlock, John (2011). Snow & Spire: Flights to Winter in the North Cascade Range. Essays contributed by David Tucker and Lowell Skoog. Wolverine Publishing. ISBN 978-0-9826154-7-8.
- Mustoe, George E.; Tucker, David S.; Kemplin, Keith L. (2012). "Giant Eocene bird footprints from Northwest Washington, USA: GIANT EOCENE BIRD TRACKS". Palaeontology. 55 (6): 1293–1305. doi:10.1111/j.1475-4983.2012.01195.x. S2CID 55949124.
- Tucker, David S.; Scott, Kevin M.; Grossman, Eric E.; Linneman, Scott (2014). "Mount Baker lahars and debris flows, ancient, modern, and future". Geological Society of America: 33–52. doi:10.1130/2014.0038(03). ISBN 978-0-8137-0038-0. S2CID 128435917. USGS 70150351.
- Ingebritsen, S. E.; Randolph-Flagg, N. G.; Gelwick, K. D.; Lundstrom, E. A.; Crankshaw, I. M.; Murveit, A. M.; Schmidt, M. E.; Bergfeld, D.; Spicer, K. R.; Tucker, D. S.; Mariner, R. H.; Evans, W. C. (2014). "Hydrothermal monitoring in a quiescent volcanic arc: Cascade Range, northwestern United States". Geofluids. 14 (3): 326–346. Bibcode:2014Gflui..14..326I. doi:10.1111/gfl.12079. S2CID 129071259. ResearchGate 260410469.
- Tucker, Dave (2015). Geology Underfoot in Western Washington. Mountain Press Publishing. ISBN 978-0-87842-640-9.
- Scott, Kevin M.; Tucker, David S.; Riedel, Jon L.; Gardner, Cynthia A.; McGeehin, John P. (2020). "Latest Pleistocene to present geology of Mount Baker Volcano, northern Cascade Range, Washington" (PDF). U.S. Geological Survey Professional Paper (1865). Reston. Bibcode:2020usgs.rept....3S. doi:10.3133/pp1865. ISSN 2330-7102. OCLC 1235102680. S2CID 226618025. UR Libraries docid:alma9978290640205216.
