= Arthur Sylvester =

Arthur Sylvester may refer to:

- Arthur G. Sylvester, American geologist
- Pen name of Arthur L. Tubbs, writer and critic
