= Geology Underfoot =

Geological guide book series

- Publisher: Mountain Press Publishing Company
- No. of books: 10 currently available
- Website: mountain-press.com/collections/geology-underfoot

Geology Underfoot is a series of geology guidebooks published by Mountain Press Publishing Company.

== Books ==
There is currently a Geology Underfoot book available for 10 regions (Colorado Western Slope, Southern California, Western Washington, Death Valley & Eastern California, Colorado Front Range, Northern Arizona, Southern Utah, Yellowstone Country, Southern Idaho, Yosemite National Park). A list of the books is below:

- Schroder, Jack; Ellwein, Amy; Englemann, George; Englemann, Carol (2022). Geology Underfoot on Colorado's Western Slope. Illustrated by Beth Waldron Yuhas and Chelsea M. Feeney. Mountain Press. ISBN 978-0-87842-708-6.
- Sylvester, Arthur Gibbs; Sharp, Robert P.; Glazner, Allen F. (2020). Geology Underfoot in Southern California. Illustrated by Elizabeth O'Black Gans. Mountain Press. ISBN 978-0-87842-698-0.
- Tucker, Dave (2015). Geology Underfoot in Western Washington. Mountain Press. ISBN 978-0-87842-640-9.
- Glazner, Allen F.; Sylvester, Arthur Gibbs; Sharp, Robert P. (2022). Geology Underfoot in Death Valley and Eastern California. Illustrated by Chelsea M. Feeney. Mountain Press. ISBN 978-0-87842-707-9.
- Abbott, Lon; Cook, Terri (2012). Geology Underfoot Along Colorado's Front Range. Mountain Press. ISBN 978-0-87842-595-2.
- Abbott, Lon; Cook, Terri (2007). Geology Underfoot in Northern Arizona. Mountain Press. ISBN 978-0-87842-528-0.
- Orndorff, Richard L.; Wieder, Robert W.; Futey, David G. (2006). Geology Underfoot in Southern Utah. Mountain Press. ISBN 978-0-87842-517-4.
- Hendrix, Marc S. (2011). Geology Underfoot in Yellowstone Country. Mountain Press. ISBN 978-0-87842-576-1.
- Willsey, Shawn (2017). Geology Underfoot in Southern Idaho. Mountain Press. ISBN 978-0-87842-678-2.
- Glazner, Allen F.; Stock, Greg M. (2010). Geology Underfoot in Yosemite National Park. Mountain Press. ISBN 978-0-87842-568-6.

More books have been published in this series, but are now out of print and no longer listed on the publisher's website. These include:

- Orndorff, Richard L.; Weider, Robert W.; Filkorn, Harry F. (2001). Geology Underfoot in Central Nevada. Mountain Press. ISBN 978-0-87842-418-4.
- Wiggers, Raymond (1997). Geology Underfoot in Illinois. Mountain Press. ISBN 978-0-87842-346-0.

== Reception ==
=== Geology Underfoot in Western Washington ===
One of the books, Geology Underfoot in Western Washington, by Bellingham geologist Dave Tucker received media attention from multiple outlets upon its release. He spoke about the book at multiple events, including at Western Washington University, the Whatcom Museum, and the Whatcom County Library System branch in Lynden. The book features 22 locations in Western Washington.

=== Geology Underfoot in Northern Arizona ===
Another book in the series, Geology Underfoot in Northern Arizona, was reviewed in multiple academic journals.

=== Geology Underfoot in Death Valley and Eastern California ===
Geology Underfoot in Death Valley and Eastern California was written by UC Santa Barbara emeritus faculty Arthur Sylvester in collaboration with UNC-Chapel Hill emeritus faculty Allen Glazner.

== Roadside Geology ==
The Geology Underfoot series is often compared to the Roadside Geology series by the same publisher as they are both series of guidebooks for accessible geological sites of interest.
