= List of The Generation Gap episodes =

This is a list of episodes for the 1969 game show The Generation Gap. Each week, musical guests would appear and perform, while various celebrities appeared as both "special guests" and contestants. These included Looney Tunes voice actor Mel Blanc, Dark Shadows co-star David Henesy, and future To Tell the Truth host Garry Moore.

The series first taped a pilot in Fall 1968, after which the series ran for 16 episodes from February 7 to May 23, 1969. Dennis Wholey hosted the pilot and first ten episodes, followed by Jack Barry for the last six.

== Dennis Wholey ==
Episode #	Taped	Aired
Pilot	Fall 1968	N/A
Pilot	The Turtles appear to perform "Elenore". No other information is known.	
01	January 30, 1969	February 7, 1969
01	Musical guests are Ohio Express and Bill Kenny of The Ink Spots. David Henesy and his mother Jane play against each other in the game.: First episode of series.	
02	February 6, 1969	February 14, 1969
02	Johnny Roventini (best known as the Philip Morris "caller") guests, while Tommy James and the Shondells are the night's musical guests. Contestants include cartoonists Fred Gallagher and Bob Minter.	
03	January 26, 1969	February 21, 1969
03	Actress Maureen O'Sullivan and daughter Tisa Farrow are among tonight's contestants. Famous vocal artist (of Bugs Bunny and Daffy Duck, among others) Mel Blanc is the night's special guest, while the 1910 Fruitgum Company perform a song.: First taped episode of series.	
04	February 26, 1969	February 28, 1969
04	Guest star is "world's greatest pitchman" Sid Stone, while David Ruffin is the musical guest. Jane Courtney and her daughter (with the same name) compete against each other.	
05	February 20, 1969	March 7, 1969
05	Musical guest is Wilson Pickett; radio actor Parker Fennelly, who played Titus Moody on Allen's Alley, is the special guest. Contestants include Jerry Bock, composer of Broadway shows including Fiddler on the Roof.	
06	March 5, 1969	March 14, 1969
06	Contestants include Wyatt Earp TV star Hugh O'Brian and Paul Levine. Guest star is Pinky Lee. Musical guests are The Brooklyn Bridge.	
07	March 6, 1969	March 21, 1969
07	Contestants include John Putnam (art director of Mad magazine). Musical guests include Joe South, and Jay and the Americans. Also appearing is Jay Jostyn, who played the title role on Mr. District Attorney (and is referred to as such during the episode).	
08	March 20, 1969	March 28, 1969
08	Contestants include Orson Bean and Barbara Cowsill. Musical guests are country singer Del Reeves, followed by The Classics IV. Special guests are The Aldrich Family mother Katharine Raht and Dark Shadows star Jonathan Frid, the latter appearing in-character as Barnabas Collins.	
09	March 20, 1969	April 4, 1969
09	Contestants include Jonathan Frid (a guest on the previous show) and comedian Soupy Sales. Musical guests are Chubby Checker, then Gladys Knight and the Pips. Special guest is Renzo Cesana.	
10	March 1969	April 11, 1969
10	Last episode with Wholey as host. No other information is known.	

== Jack Barry ==
Episode #	Taped	Aired
11	March/April 1969	April 18, 1969
11	Special guest is Tommy Roe. Contestants include former I've Got a Secret host Garry Moore. Musical guests are Joey Dee and the Starliters, then Tommy Little.: Barry's first episode as host, making a return to national television after the quiz show scandals blacklisted him in 1958.	
12	April 3, 1969	April 25, 1969
12	No information available.	
13	April 3, 1969	May 2, 1969
13	Contestants include pianist Craig Hundley, while Kenny Delmar (who played Senator Claghorn on Allen's Alley) guests. Musical appearances are by Snooky Lanson, followed by the Peppermint Rainbow.	
14	April 18, 1969	May 9, 1969
14	Shelley Plimpton is the night's performer, while Buffalo Bob Smith guests with an appearance by Howdy Doody.	
15	May 7, 1969	May 16, 1969
15	Contestants include "New York Magazine" writer Jimmy Breslin and composer Jerry Bock. Special guest is announcer Fred Foy, while Jerry Butler performs as the night's musical guest.: Last taped episode.	
16	April 18, 1969	May 23, 1969
16	Contestants include actress Peggy Cass. Special guest is Marvin Miller of The Millionaire, while Peaches and Herb performs as the musical guest.: Series finale.	
