= Navy Log =

American TV drama anthology series (1955–1958)

- Genre: Anthology
- Written by: Peter Barry; David E. Durston; Max Ehrlich; Leonard Lee; Roger Marston; William N. Robson; Allan E. Sloane
- Directed by: Samuel Gallu; Leslie Goodwins; Reginald LeBorg; Oscar Rudolph; Jean Yarbrough
- Theme music composer: Irving Bibo; Fred Steiner
- Opening theme: "Navy Log March"
- Country of origin: United States
- Original language: English
- No. of seasons: 3
- No. of episodes: 104

Production
- Producer: Samuel Gallu
- Cinematography: Ken Hodges; Frank V. Phillips; Lester White
- Running time: 22–24 minutes
- Production companies: Gallu Productions; Worldvision Enterprises (post-1960 international reruns only)

Original release
- Network: CBS (1955–1956); ABC (1956–1958)
- Release: September 20, 1955 – September 25, 1958

Navy Log is an American television drama anthology series created by Samuel Gallu that presented stories from the history of the United States Navy. This series ran on CBS from September 20, 1955, until September 25, 1956. On October 17, 1956, it moved to ABC, where it aired until September 25, 1958. It changed networks because CBS "could not schedule it to the sponsor's wishes". The program aired for a total of three seasons and 104 episodes.

The Department of Defense and departments of the Navy cooperated with production of the filmed 30-minute series. In conjunction with that cooperation, the Navy Information Office solicited suggestions for stories, accompanied by brief documentation, with a Navy Log Project Officer in charge. The opening scene, filmed aboard the USS Bennington, showed 2,000 sailors forming the words "Navy Log".

The program's theme was "The Navy Log March" by Fred Steiner. Episodes opened with an announcer saying, "This is Navy Log. The dramas you see each week on Navy Log are from official U. S. Navy files. They tell of ships and places and those who man them. Recorded through the years in Navy Log."

In August 1957, then-Senator John F. Kennedy was technical adviser for the "P. T. 109" episode of the program, which related the story of the sinking of the patrol torpedo boat that he commanded. He also was a guest on the broadcast of that episode.

== Staff and sponsors ==
Sam Gallu was the producer. In 1955, the New York and Washington chapters of the Navy League of the United States awarded him a citation of appreciation. In 1957, he received a distinguished public service award from the Navy for his efforts related to Navy Log. CBS Television Film Sales was the distributor.

Allan Sloane was the writer, and Tom Connors was the production manager. John Ewing was the art director, and Fred Steiner was the music director.

Sponsors for the series included W. A. Shaeffer Pens, Maytag, American Tobacco, and the United States Rubber Company.

== Reception ==
Navy Log used a fictionalized — rather than documentary — approach for its presentation of stories. Executive producer Leslie Harris contrasted it with Victory at Sea, which NBC presented as a documentary. Harris said the documentary treatment created too large a scope and failed to let viewers feel "close to any of the participants" or view action as those on hand saw it.

In at least one broadcast, fictionalization stirred discontent. The crew of the PC-565, only patrol craft that sank a German submarine during World War II, saw their presidential-citation-winning efforts turned into what a newspaper columnist described as "a comedy of errors". Jo Coppola wrote in Newsday that the men involved said the facts and circumstances were not shown correctly.

Columnist Hal Humphrey described the first two episodes of the series as having excellent production quality but needing a higher quality of writing. He described some of the lines as "very trite and corny dialogue". A review in The New York Times of the first ABC episode said, "Action shots in the later part of the half hour were exciting and graphic, but the acting and dialogue in general were rather routine." An unsigned review in the trade publication Broadcasting noted that the program needed "a firmer hand at editing" to avoid elements that appeared amateurish..

== Syndication ==
CBS Television Film Sales released episodes of Navy Log in two 52-episode packages that local stations could run over two years.

== Notable guest stars ==
- Philip Ahn as General Chen in "Operation Typewriter" (1956)
- John Archer as the Skipper in the episode "Hiya Pam" (1955)
- Raymond Bailey as Lieutenant Fenton in "Operation Typewriter" (1956)
- Scotty Beckett as Ensign in "Survive" (1957)
- Edward Binns and Paul Picerni in "The Phantom of the Blue Angels" (1955)
- Ray Boyle in "Bucket of Sand" (1956) and as Reed in "The Beach Pounders" (1957)
- Paul Burke as Sparks in "Sky Pilot" (1955)
- Phyllis Coates as Marge in "Web Feet" (1956)
- Russ Conway as Commander Loomis in "A Day for a Stingray" (1956)
- Walter Coy as Col. Jack Connors in "Destination - 1600 Pennsylvania Avenue NW" (1956) and "The Lady and the Atom" (1957)
- Francis De Sales in the role of naval officers in "Operation Three-In-One" (1955) and "Get Back Somehow" (1956)
- Don Devlin as Bob Levine in "Ninety Day Wonder" (1956)
- Mason Alan Dinehart as Marly in "Joe Foss, Devilbird" (1957). This episodes focuses on the World War II hero Joe Foss, later the governor of South Dakota and an American sportsman.
- Benson Fong as Colonel Huam in "Operation Typewriter" (1956)
- Dean Fredericks as DeMarco in "War of the Whale Boats" (1957)
- Ron Hagerthy as Johnny Fletcher in "Ninety Day Wonder" (1956), as Jimmy Milano in "The Lady and the Atom" (1957), and as Swenson in "The Draft Dodger" (1958)
- Gloria Henry as Eileen Murphy in "The Decoy" (1957)
- Richard Jaeckel as Lieutenant Bradshaw in "War of the Whale Boats" (1957)
- Don Keefer as McNair in "Ito of Attu" (1957)
- Douglas Kennedy as Lt. Cmdr. Boggs in "Men from Mars" (1956) and as Cmdr. Bourne in "Call Conrad" (1957)
- Wright King as Joey McAdams in "Home Is a Sailor (1957)
- Robert Knapp as Captain Weatherby in "The Death of Dillinger" (1956)
- Tyler McVey as Monsignor Flaherty in "Sky Pilot" (1955) and "The Draft Dodger" (1958)
- Eve Miller as Lois MacKenzie in "Call Conrad" (1957)
- Steve Pendleton as Bill Mathison in "The Long Weekend" (1956)
- Mike Ragan as Horn in "American U-Boat III" (1958)
- Gregory Walcott as Jack Franklin in "The Long Weekend" (1956)
- Clint Eastwood as Burns in "The Lonely Watch" (1958)
