= Kevin Scott =

Kevin Scott may refer to:

- Kevin Scott (speed skater) (born 1969), Canadian speed skater
- Kevin Scott (footballer) (born 1966), English footballer
- Kevin Scott (American football) (born 1969), former American football cornerback
- Kevin Scott (Canadian football) (born 1983), Canadian football long snapper and defensive lineman
- Kevin Scott (badminton) (born 1964), Scottish badminton player
- Kevin Scott (computer scientist) (born 1972), Chief Technology Officer at Microsoft
- Kevin M. Scott (born 1935), American geologist and author
