= The Generation Gap =

- The Generation Gap title logo.
- Created by: Castle-Drive Productions for Talent Associates/Norton-Simon
- Directed by: Mike Gargiulo
- Presented by: Dennis Wholey (February 7–April 11); Jack Barry (April 18–May 23)
- Narrated by: Fred Foy
- Country of origin: United States
- No. of episodes: 16 (list of episodes)

Production
- Executive producer: Daniel Melnick
- Producer: Chester Feldman
- Running time: 30 Minutes

Original release
- Network: ABC
- Release: February 7 – May 23, 1969

The Generation Gap is a primetime American game show that aired from February 7 to May 23, 1969, on ABC. It was originally hosted by Dennis Wholey, who was replaced by Jack Barry after ten episodes had aired. Fred Foy announced during the entire run.

Two teams of three players competed – one composed of people under the age of thirty, the other being people over thirty. At least one member of each team was a well-known celebrity, occasionally playing against a relative on the other team.

== Gameplay ==
Each team had to answer questions about the other's generation; for example, one episode had a youngster successfully identifying the Little Orphan Annie radio theme, while an adult on the other team watched a performance of "Yummy Yummy Yummy" by the 1910 Fruitgum Co. band, and had to complete the lyrics: "I've got ____ in my tummy."

Each round featured questions directed at each individual contestant worth $20 apiece. The other team could earn $5 for predicting whether their opponents could answer correctly. Shortly into the run, the prediction rule was discarded and each correct answer now scored $25. After all six players had each answered a question, the teams answered six Cross-Generation questions. Any player could buzz in, with a correct answer worth $10 but an incorrect answer deducting $10 from the team's earnings. The team who earned the most money after three rounds would have their winnings tripled (so that each contestant on that team would receive the team's final score).

At least one question on each show involved a musical guest from either the past or present.

== Broadcast history ==
The series was aired on Friday nights and first hosted by Wholey from the pilot through the tenth episode on April 11, 1969. Beginning the following week, he was replaced by Jack Barry in his first national hosting job since the quiz show scandals forced him and his company out of the business more than a decade earlier.

It was hoped that, if the show were a success in primetime, it would lead to a daytime slot. However, ratings were not strong enough and The Generation Gap ended after 16 episodes. Despite this, Barry's game show career was successfully revived, and he thanked ABC for the opportunity during his goodbyes on the last episode.

=== Foreign versions ===
The Generation Gap has not been revived in other countries, partly due to its short run. Despite its title, The Generation Game which originally ran for 11 highly successful series in the United Kingdom between 1971 and 1981, was based on a 1969 Dutch show entitled Een van de acht ("One of the Eight"), which used a stunt-based format much like that of Beat the Clock and Truth or Consequences.

=== Revivals ===
While not explicitly revived, the concept of "Juniors vs. Seniors" being over/under the age of thirty was later used on the 1984-1985 Mark Goodson series Trivia Trap.

The 1998 VH1 series My Generation could be considered a revival due to a similar format and emphasis on music, which featured two teams of two people representing different years. The game was played for points, and the series used a Pyramid-esque bonus round for a prize package.

Canadian youth channel YTV produced a game show of their own called Generation Gap hosted by Jeff Rechner which ran for a single season in 1989. This version was a stunt-based show which pitted a team of kids against a team of adults. However, beyond the title, it had very little to do with the original series.

== Episode status ==
Unlike most other game shows of its era, all of the episodes of The Generation Gap have survived, including the 1968 pilot. The first, eighth, and ninth episodes circulate among collectors.
