= List of general secretary-treasurers of the Industrial Workers of the World =

The General Secretary-Treasurer is an elected position in the Industrial Workers of the World (IWW). The IWW is a revolutionary labor union based in Chicago, Illinois, United States. Based in Chicago, the IWW operates in various countries around the world, including Canada, Great Britain, Australia, and elsewhere. Below is a list of those who held the position as General Secretary-Treasurer from the union's founding in 1905 to present day.

== List ==
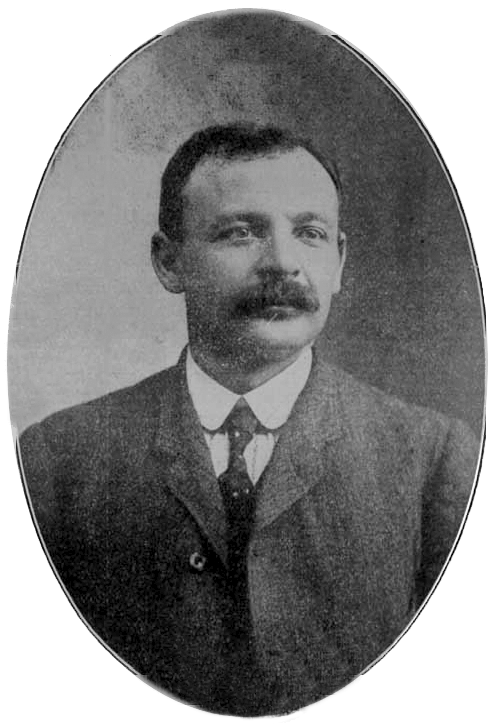
William E. Trautmann was the first General Secretary-Treasurer (1905 – 1908)

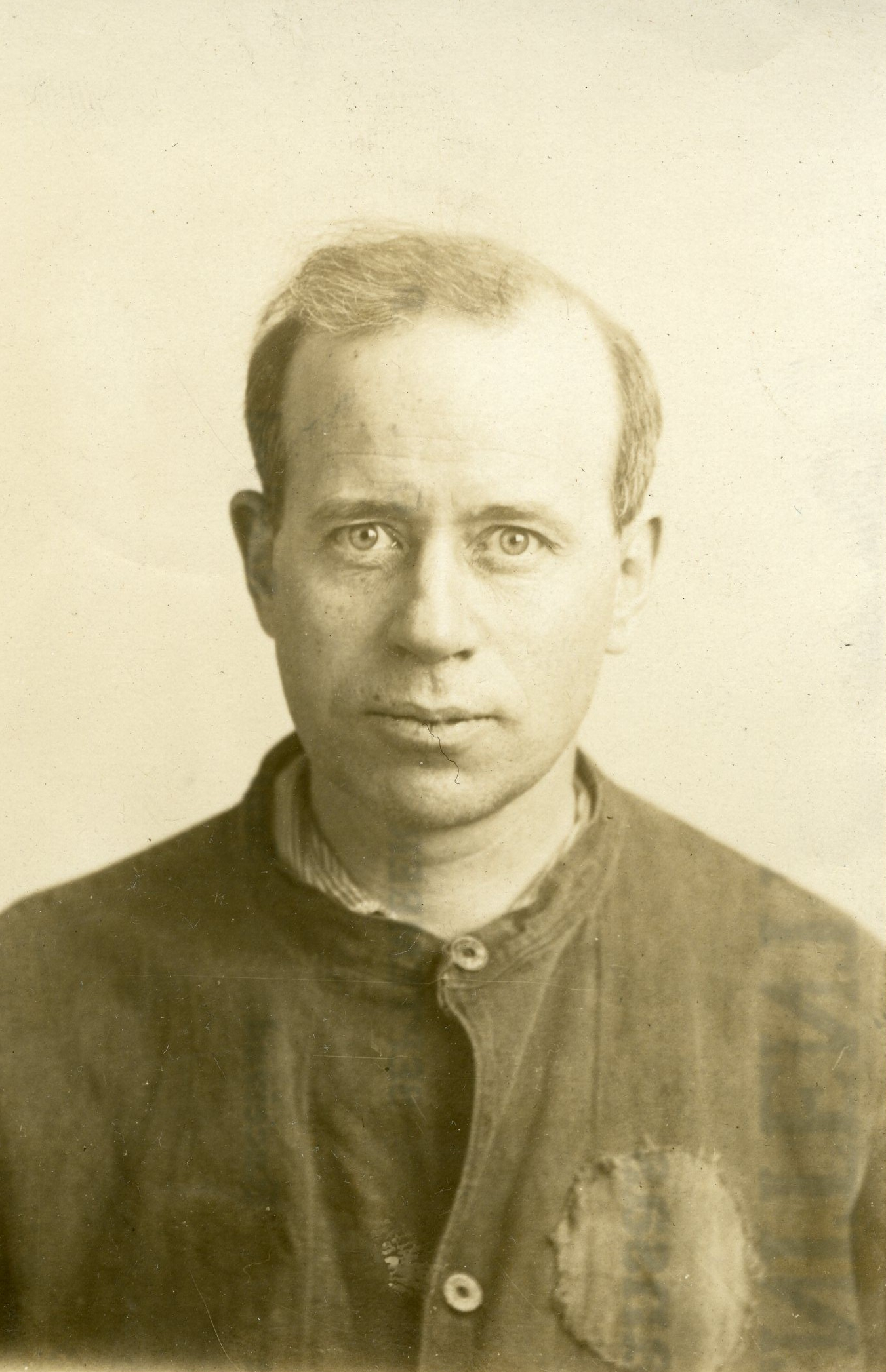
Vincent St. John held the position from 1909 – 1914)

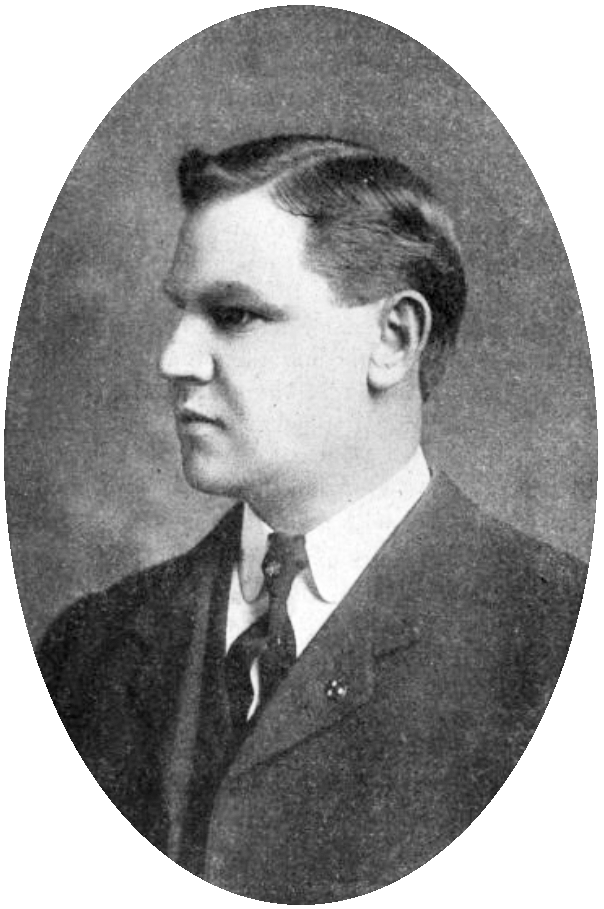
'Big' Bill Haywood held the position from 1915 until the beginning of his trial on espionage charges. He returned to the position from February 1918 until December of that year.

1. William E. Trautmann July 1905 – Dec 1908
2. Vincent St. John Jan 1909 – Dec 1914
3. William D. Haywood Jan 1915 – Sept 1917
4. Fred Hardy (acting) Oct 1917 – Feb 1918
5. William D. Haywood* Feb 1918 – Dec 1918
6. Peter Stone (acting) Jan – Mar 9, 1919
7. Thomas Whitehead Mar 10, 1919 – Aug 1920
8. George Hardy Sept 1920 – July 1921
9. John Grady July 1921 – Nov 1922
10. E. W. Latchem (Pro Tem) Dec 1922 – Feb 1923
11. Jack Gillis March 1 1923 – June 30 1923
12. Harry G. Clark (Pro Tem) July 1 1923 – Nov 1923
13. Axel W. Sodling Nov 10 1923 – Nov 17 1923
14. Sam Forbes (Pro Tem) Nov 24 1923 – Feb 1924
15. Tom Doyle Mar 1, 1924 – Oct 17, 1924
16. Ed Fahey (Pro Tem) Oct 18, 1924 – Nov. 16, 1924
17. P.J. Welinder (Pro Tem) Nov 17, 1924 – Feb 1925
18. Arthur Coleman Mar 1 1925 – Feb 1926
19. John I. Turner Mar 1926 – Feb 1927
20. Lee Tulin Mar 1927 – Feb 1930
21. James Sullivan Mar 1930 – Feb 1931
22. Herbert Mahler Mar 1931 – Nov 1932
23. Joseph Wagner Dec 1932 – Feb 1936
24. Fred W. Thompson Mar 1936 – Feb 1937
25. Walter H. Westman Mar 1937 – Dec 1939
26. Joseph Wagner* Jan 1940 – Dec 1940
27. Walter H. Westman* Jan 1941 – Dec 1946
28. W.A. Unger Jan 1947 – Dec 1947
29. A.J. Farley Jan 1948 – Dec 1948
30. Walter H. Westman* Jan 1949 – Dec 1964
31. Carl Keller Jan 1965 – Apr 1969
32. Allan H. Just May 1969 – Jul 1970
33. Lionel Bottari Aug 1970 – Dec 1971
34. Patrick Murfin Jan 1972 – Jul 1972
35. Goddard C. Graves Jul 1972 – Dec 1972
36. Michael D. Brown Jan 1973 – Dec 1973
37. Craig Ledford Jan 1974 – Dec 1975
38. Kathleen L. Taylor Jan 1976 – Dec 1977
39. Michael Hargis Jan 1978 – Dec 1980
40. Carol F. Mason Jan 1981 – Aug 1981
41. Dan Pless Sep 1981 – Dec 1981
42. Mary H. Frohman Jan 1982 – Dec 1982
43. Dave Tucker Jan 1983 – Dec 1983
44. Jon Bekken Jan 1984 – Aug 1984
45. Rochelle Semel Sep 1984 – Nov 1984
46. Jon Bekken* Dec 1984 – Dec 1985
47. Mark Kaufmann Jan 1986 – Dec 1986
48. Penny Pixler Jan 1987 – Dec 1987
49. Paul Poulos Jan 1988 – Dec 1988
50. Jeff Ditz Jan 1989 – Dec 1990
51. Jess Grant Jan 1991 – Dec 1992
52. Harry Siitonen Jan 1993 – Dec 1993
53. Robert Rush Jan 1994 – Dec 1994
54. Fred Chase Jan 1995 – Dec 1999
55. Alexis Buss Jan 2000 – Dec 2005
56. Mark E. Damron Jan 2006 – Dec 2008
57. Chris Lytle Jan 2009 – Dec 2009
58. Joe Tessone Jan 2010 – Dec 2011
59. Samuel Green Jan 2012 – Dec 2013
60. Monika Vykoukal Jan 2014 – Dec 2014
61. Randall Jamrok Jan 2015 – Dec 2016
62. Arella Vargas Jan 2017 – Dec 2017
63. Travis Erickson Jan 2018 – Dec 2019
64. J. Cameron Mancini Jan 2020 – Dec 2021
65. Kelsey Tanabe-Walker Jan 2022 – Dec 2024
66. Allie Graff Jan 2025 – Present
