= William E. Trautmann =

American trade unionist and IWW co-founder (1869–1940)

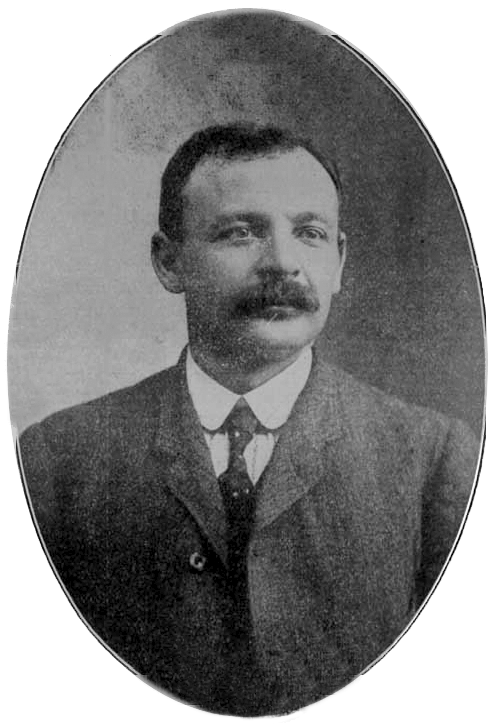

2nd General Secretary-Treasurer of the Industrial Workers of the World
- In office July 1905 – December 1908
- Preceded by: Position established
- Succeeded by: Vincent Saint John

Personal details
- Born: July 1, 1869 Grahamstown, New Zealand
- Died: November 18, 1940 (aged 71) Los Angeles, California, U.S.
- Occupation: Founding Secretary-Treasurer of the Industrial Workers of the World (IWW)

William Ernst Trautmann (July 1, 1869 – November 18, 1940) was an American trade unionist and author. In 1904 he was one of six co-founders of the Industrial Workers of the World (IWW) and was elected its first General Secretary-Treasurer.

Born to German parents in New Zealand, Trautmann moved to Europe as a young teenager. He worked his way up in the brewery industry in Germany, but was expelled from the country for radical labor activities. He emigrated to the U.S. in 1890 and became a key figure in the United Brewery Workers' Union before being banned for his IWW participation.

Between 1905 and 1912, he held various IWW posts and wrote key pamphlets expressing the union's vision. Following the 1912 Lawrence textile strike, he had a falling out with IWW leadership over the best organizational tactics to pursue. In 1913 he briefly joined the so-called "Yellow IWW" in the Socialist Labor Party. In 1922 he published a novel, Riot, drawing on his experiences as an IWW activist during the 1909 Pressed Steel Car Strike in McKees Rock, Pennsylvania.

== Early life ==
William Trautmann was born in New Zealand into a German-American miner family. When he was four, his father died. At age 14, he moved to Poland where he worked as a brewer's apprentice, and was compelled to work as many hours as his brewmaster demanded. During this time, Trautmann was exposed to radical labor ideas, whose implementation would become his life's work.

He held various jobs throughout Eastern Europe before putting down roots in Germany. There, he graduated from his brewery apprenticeship and became an outspoken supporter of other brewery workers enduring the same harsh conditions he had endured. Branded a "dangerous radical", he was forced to leave Germany in late 1890 under Bismark's anti-socialist laws. He opted to relocate to the U.S. since his mother and siblings were already living there.

Trautmann settled in Ohio where he was a labor organizer for the United Brewery Workers' Union. In 1900 he was named editor of the union's German-English newspaper, Brauer-Zeitung. His views on socialism and industrial unionism put him on a collision course with the union's parent organization, the American Federation of Labor (AFL): "His vocal opposition to the increasing political conservatism of the AFL cost him his position as editor, and he was forced out in the spring of 1905."

== Time in IWW ==
In November 1904, Trautmann met with George Estes, W. L. Hall, Isaac Cowen, Clarence Smith, and Thomas J. Hagerty at an informal gathering in Chicago. The six men believed that American labor unions had become powerless and a new movement was necessary. Their meeting was the genesis of the IWW. Trautmann co-wrote the "Industrial Union Manifesto", which called for the establishment of the IWW as "the economic organization of the working class, without affiliation with any political party." The organization was formally launched the following June at a convention in Chicago. Trautmann was elected General Secretary-Treasurer.

While in the IWW, he was an organizer, propagandist, and pamphleteer. He became known for his essays articulating the IWW's philosophy. His works included "One Big Union" (1911), "Why Strikes are Lost & How to Win" (1912), and "Industrial Unionism: The Hope of the Workers" (1913). In his unfinished autobiography, he said he considered his IWW publications to be his greatest achievement since they spread the revolutionary industrial unionism movement throughout the world.

After the resignation of Eugene Debs, Trautmann was thrust into an IWW leadership role. While he was an effective writer and public speaker, his administrative skills were lacking. He "failed to maintain accurate membership records of either individuals or local unions, and his financial accounts were in even worse shape." At the 1906 national convention, he was criticized by IWW leaders for not having brought copies of the organization's financial report.

Trautmann was involved in many of the factional disputes that plagued the IWW after its founding. In 1906 he and his allies Vincent St. John and Daniel DeLeon were at odds with IWW President Charles Sherman, who represented the more conservative wing of the union. Some members feared Sherman would allow the IWW to pattern itself after the AFL. Trautmann and his allies "advocated direct action, opposed binding contracts, and discussed the use of sabotage and the general strike." His radical faction rallied enough support to outvote Sherman and his backers, and gain control of the IWW.

With his secretary-treasurer duties transferred to St. John, Trautmann focused on field organizing, a job that suited him better. After several failed attempts at strike agitation, he switched tactics to target workplaces with large numbers of European migrant workers, since he was one himself. This resulted in him leading the 1909 Pressed Steel Car strike in McKees Rocks, Pennsylvania. As the skirmish escalated, he sought to keep the union protests peaceful, but violence erupted, five state troopers were killed, and Trautmann was arrested. Thousands of workers threatened to riot if he was not released, which led to his quick trial and acquittal. Two weeks later, the factory operators acceded to most of the workers' demands, and Trautmann achieved his first labor victory.

Between 1909 and 1912, he endeavored to establish IWW unions among Akron rubber workers and Detroit auto workers. In 1912 he helped manage the "Bread and Roses" textile strike in Lawrence, Massachusetts. By that time, however, he had begun to lose faith in the direct action approach favored by the communist-influenced "Red" IWW faction. Trautmann sided with the "Yellow" IWW, which emphasized political action. In 1913 he joined Daniel DeLeon's Socialist Labor Party, a Detroit-based IWW splinter group, in the position of "full-time propagandist". Trautmann did not remain long in that post, and in 1914 he left the IWW for good.

== Post-IWW years ==
In 1922, Trautmann wrote a historical novel, Riot, based on his experiences organizing the McKees Rocks strike. That same year he published America's Dilemma, which expressed his shift toward anti-communism and peaceful labor reform:

Millions of toilers are today agreed that not capitalism, not the employers of labor as a class, are the enemies of the workers so much as those who, claiming to spring from the ranks of the proletariat, have become the apostles of corruption, the promoters of crime, the fomentors of chaos and destruction.

In his last years, Trautmann lived in Los Angeles where he worked on his autobiography. He was also involved in a New Deal highway project until his death in 1940.

== Works ==
- Trautmann, William E. (1911). One Big Union: An Outline of a Possible Industrial Organization of the Working Class, with CHART. Chicago: Charles H. Kerr & Co.
- ———— (1912). Direct Action and Sabotage. Chicago: Charles H. Kerr & Co.
- ———— (1922). Riot. Chicago: Chicago Labor Printing Co. OCLC 7956115.
- ———— (1922). America's Dilemma. Chicago: J. W. Bornhoeft. OCLC 894289558.
