= The Dick Cavett Show =

American talk show

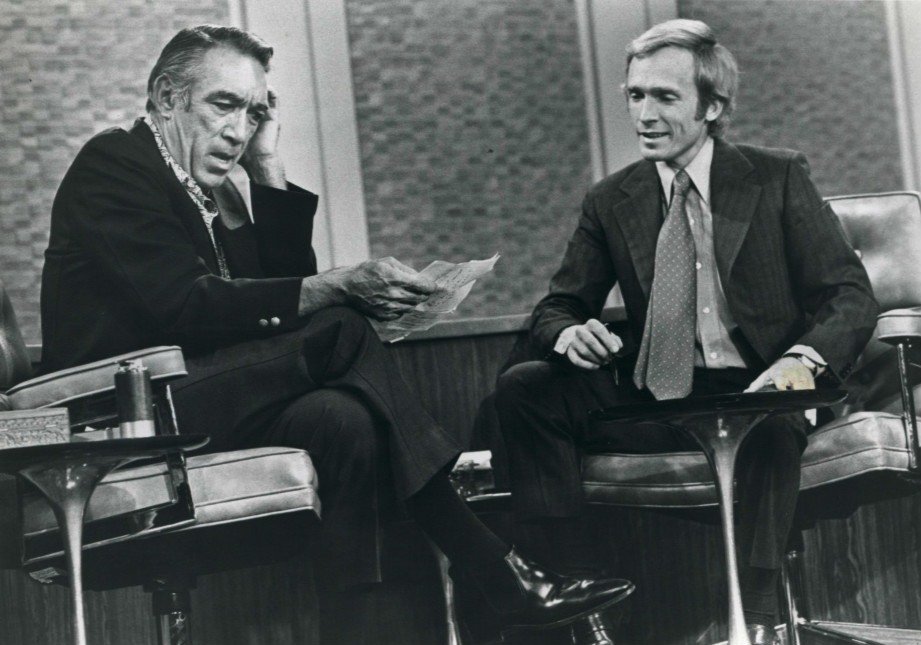
- Cavett (right) interviewing Anthony Quinn in 1971
- Created by: Dick Cavett
- Presented by: Dick Cavett
- Announcer: Fred Foy (1969–1975)
- Music by: Bobby Rosengarden (bandleader, 1969–1975)
- Country of origin: United States
- Original language: English

Production
- Running time: 30–90 minutes
- Production company: Daphne Productions

Original release
- Network: ABC
- Release: March 4, 1968 – January 5, 1975
- Network: CBS
- Release: August 16 – September 6, 1975
- Network: PBS
- Release: October 10, 1977 – October 8, 1982
- Network: USA Network
- Release: September 30, 1985 – September 23, 1986
- Network: ABC
- Release: September 22 – December 30, 1986
- Network: CNBC
- Release: April 17, 1989 – January 26, 1996

The Dick Cavett Show is the title of several American television talk shows hosted by Dick Cavett between 1968 and 1996. The programs aired in daytime, prime time and late night on ABC, CBS, PBS, USA Network and CNBC.

The best-known version aired late nights on ABC from December 29, 1969, to January 1, 1975, opposite NBC's The Tonight Show Starring Johnny Carson. The program featured extended interviews and conversations with actors, musicians, writers, politicians and other public figures. Guests included Groucho Marx, Katharine Hepburn, Orson Welles, Muhammad Ali, John Lennon and Yoko Ono, Jimi Hendrix, Janis Joplin, David Bowie, Salvador Dalí, Gore Vidal and Norman Mailer.

== Show history ==
The Dick Cavett Show began as a series of television programs hosted by comedian, comedy writer and author Dick Cavett. Although Cavett later hosted versions for CBS, PBS, USA Network and CNBC, the title is most closely associated with the programs he hosted for ABC between 1968 and 1975.

=== ABC, 1968–1975 ===
==== Daytime series ====
Cavett's first ABC series premiered on March 4, 1968, as a 90-minute weekday morning program originally titled This Morning. The title was subsequently changed to The Dick Cavett Show, and the series continued until January 24, 1969. The first daytime show featured Gore Vidal, Muhammad Ali and Angela Lansbury. ABC pressured Cavett to get prominent celebrities on the show, although subsequent shows without them got higher ratings and more critical acclaim.

Although normally based in New York, Cavett also took the daytime show to Hollywood. Groucho Marx, who had appeared on the program in April 1968, appeared again when Cavett broadcast from Hollywood on June 19.

==== Prime-time series ====
After the daytime series ended, Cavett returned to ABC with a summer replacement prime-time series that aired three times per week from May 26 to September 19, 1969. The series was sufficiently well received for ABC to give Cavett a regular late-night program later that year.

==== Late-night series ====
The late-night Dick Cavett Show premiered on December 29, 1969, and ran until January 1, 1975, opposite NBC's The Tonight Show Starring Johnny Carson. Cavett took over the ABC late-night time slot from The Joey Bishop Show. Bobby Rosengarden served as the show's bandleader and musical director, while Fred Foy, best known as the announcer and narrator of The Lone Ranger, was the announcer.

In addition to his usual monologue, Cavett opened each show by reading selected questions submitted by audience members and responding with jokes or improvised remarks. One question, "What makes New York so crummy these days?", prompted the response "Tourists."

While Cavett and Carson shared many of the same guests, Cavett was receptive to rock and roll artists to a degree unusual at the time, as well as to authors, politicians and other personalities outside the entertainment field. The wide variety of guests, combined with Cavett's literate and intelligent approach to comedy, appealed to a significant enough number of viewers to keep the show running for several years despite the competition from Carson's show. Carson's move to southern California in the early 1970s to focus on Hollywood celebrities also helped to minimize guest overlap.

The late-night show's 45-minute midpoint was signaled by "Glitter and Be Gay" from Leonard Bernstein's Candide. The piece became associated with Cavett and was subsequently used as the introduction to his PBS series and played by house bands during his later talk-show appearances.

Typically each show had several guests, but occasionally Cavett devoted an entire program to a single guest. Among those receiving such treatment, some more than once, were Groucho Marx, Laurence Olivier, Judy Garland, Katharine Hepburn (without an audience), Bette Davis, Orson Welles, Noël Coward (who appeared on the same show with Alfred Lunt, Lynn Fontanne, Tammy Grimes and Brian Bedford), John Lennon and Yoko Ono, Janis Joplin, Ray Charles, Alfred Hitchcock, Fred Astaire, Woody Allen, Gloria Swanson, Jerry Lewis, Lucille Ball, Zero Mostel ("on some shows I've had just one guest, but tonight I have Zero"), Bob Hope and David Bowie. These shows helped showcase Cavett's skills as a host who could attract guests who otherwise might not give television interviews, at the expense of some of the unpredictability of the multiple-guest format.

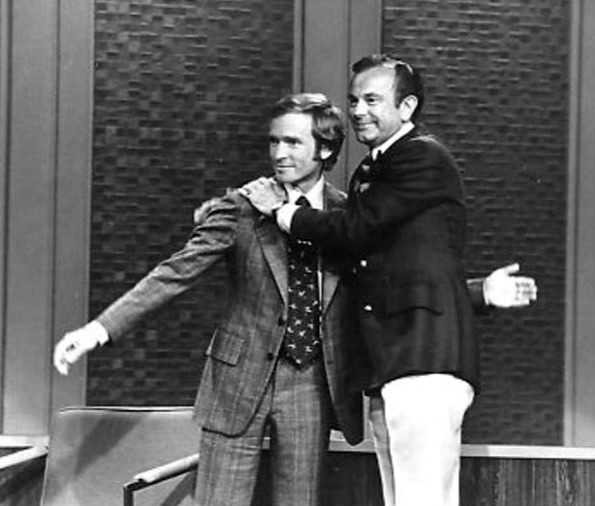
Dick Cavett and Jack Paar in 1973

==== Wide World of Entertainment ====
In January 1973, despite a vociferous letter campaign, ratings forced the show to be cut back to occasional status, airing one week a month as part of ABC's Wide World of Entertainment. Jack Paar, whom ABC had tried to recruit as Cavett's successor, insisted that both he and Cavett be given at least one week per month as a sign of respect for Cavett. The rotating schedule made it difficult for either show to retain an audience. Jack Paar Tonite ran from January until November 1973. By the end of 1974, Cavett's program was airing only twice per month. The ABC run ended on January 1, 1975.

=== CBS, 1975 ===
Cavett returned to network television later in 1975 with a short-lived Saturday-night series on CBS. It aired from August 16 to September 6 and differed from his earlier programs by incorporating more elements of a traditional variety show.

=== PBS, 1977–1982 ===
In 1977, two years after the end of his original ABC run, Cavett returned to television with a new version produced by New York public television station WNET/Thirteen. The PBS series featured single guests in a half-hour format and was produced by Christopher Porterfield, a former roommate of Cavett's at Yale University who had coauthored the book Cavett, published in August 1974.

The shorter format emphasized extended conversation with a single guest rather than the multiple-guest format used by many of the ABC programs. The PBS version received several Emmy Award nominations, including nominations in 1978, 1979 and 1982. The show remained on the PBS lineup until affiliates voted it off the schedule in 1982.

=== USA Network and return to ABC, 1985–1986 ===
Cavett revived the program on USA Network in 1985. The prime-time series ran from September 30, 1985, until September 23, 1986.

While the USA series was still nearing the end of its run, Cavett returned to ABC late night. That version aired on Tuesday and Wednesday nights from September 22 to December 30, 1986. It marked Cavett's first regular ABC series since the end of his original network run in 1975.

=== CNBC, 1989–1996 ===
Another version of The Dick Cavett Show premiered on CNBC in 1989 and continued until January 1996. The CNBC series returned Cavett to the interview format with which his earlier programs had become associated.

=== Production ===
On all three of the early ABC shows, the bandleader was Bobby Rosengarden and the announcer was Fred Foy, known for his work on The Lone Ranger. The morning show was produced by Woody Fraser. Tony Converse was the producer of the 1969 ABC prime-time show and the original producer of the ABC late-night show, succeeded by John Gilroy. Cavett's writer was Dave Lloyd.

The programs were principally associated with New York, although individual editions were also recorded elsewhere. Cavett took the daytime series to Hollywood in June 1968, and later programs originated from other locations when the subject or guests warranted it.

== Legacy ==
The Dick Cavett Show became known for extended, often unscripted conversations with guests drawn from entertainment, politics, literature and the arts. Cavett's willingness to interview writers, political figures and counterculture musicians alongside traditional Hollywood celebrities distinguished the program from many contemporary talk shows. During the original ABC late-night run, the program developed a reputation as a more cerebral alternative to The Tonight Show Starring Johnny Carson, with Cavett particularly associated with interviews of contemporary political and cultural figures.

Cavett's interviewing style emphasized sustained conversation rather than a succession of short promotional appearances. Episodes were sometimes devoted to a single guest, allowing discussions to continue for substantially longer than became common on later network talk shows. A 1972 profile in The New Yorker described Cavett's approach as deliberately avoiding formulas and clichés and noted the program's popularity with younger viewers.

The surviving programs have also become an archive of American political and cultural life from the late 1960s through the early 1980s. Interviews and broadcasts from the series have been reused in documentaries about subjects including the Watergate scandal and Muhammad Ali. The PBS documentary Dick Cavett's Watergate was constructed largely from Cavett's interviews with figures involved in the scandal, while the HBO documentary Ali & Cavett: The Tale of the Tapes drew on Ali's numerous appearances on the program.

The show's interviews have continued to circulate through home-video releases, television reruns and online archives, introducing later audiences to appearances by figures including Jimi Hendrix, Janis Joplin, Katharine Hepburn, Groucho Marx, John Lennon and Yoko Ono. Cavett's PBS series, launched by WNET in 1977, also became one of the station's notable programs of that period.

== Notable broadcasts ==
=== 1968–69 ===
==== March 4, 1968: The premiere of This Morning ====
In the first broadcast of his 90-minute morning show, Cavett had as his first guest engineer, designer and futurist Buckminster Fuller. The two discussed how politicians would eventually become obsolete through technological advances, and the wide-ranging discussion included a comment from Fuller that a woman is a baby factory and that a man's role is to simply press the right button. Later on in the program, Cavett chatted with actress Patricia Neal, who discussed her long rehabilitation from a near-fatal stroke in 1965.

==== March 27, 1968: Christine Jorgensen walks off the show ====
During an interview with Christine Jorgensen, the first widely known trans woman to have sex reassignment surgery (in this case a complete male-to-female vaginoplasty), Jorgensen walked off the show when she felt offended after Cavett asked her about the status of her romantic life with her wife; because Jorgensen was the only scheduled guest, Cavett spent the rest of that show talking about how he had not meant to offend her.

==== June 6, 1968: Robert F. Kennedy assassination ====
As a result of continuing coverage of the Robert F. Kennedy assassination that took place earlier that morning, Cavett's show did not begin until 11 am, and was interrupted at 11:20 for 30 minutes of further updates on the unfolding tragedy. At 11:50, Cavett's show returned for its final 10 minutes. The assassination was the only topic discussed during the 30 minutes of the show. On the following two mornings, the show began at its regular time of 10:30 am, and was once again devoted exclusively to assassination coverage, and presented without commercial interruption.

==== June 13, 1969: Groucho Marx's one-man show ====
Because of conflicting network broadcasts, Cavett pre-taped a one-man, 60-minute episode with Groucho Marx.

==== July 7, 1969: Jimi Hendrix ====
In the July 7, 1969, interview, rock star Jimi Hendrix modestly downplayed his abilities and displayed his sense of humor. Perhaps most importantly, he revealed some of his aesthetic ideals and the purpose of his music when he discussed his concept of the "Electric Church":

[Music] is getting to be more spiritual than anything now. Pretty soon I believe that they are going to have to rely on music to get some kind of peace of mind or satisfaction—direction, actually—more so than politics, because politics is really on an ego scene…[Politics] is the art of words, which means nothing. So, therefore you have to rely on more of an earthier substance like music or the arts, theater, acting, painting, whatever…[The Electric Church] is a belief that I have. We do use electric guitars. Everything is electrified nowadays. So, therefore the belief comes through electricity to people. That's why we play so loud. Because it doesn't actually hit through the eardrums like most groups do nowadays. They say 'Well, we're going to play loud too, because they're playing loud.' And they've got this real shrill sound that's really hard. We plan for our sound to go inside the soul of the person…and see if they can awaken some sort of thing in their minds, because there are so many sleeping people.

Hendrix then performed "Hear My Train A Comin'" with the house band and played the guitar with his teeth at the end of the song.

==== August 19, 1969: The Woodstock Show ====
On Tuesday, August 19, 1969, Jefferson Airplane, Joni Mitchell, David Crosby and Stephen Stills (of Crosby, Stills, Nash & Young) all appeared on the show. The episode is now often referred to as "The Woodstock Show", as many of the performers, and Cavett's audience, came directly from the concert for the taping the afternoon before the show aired. Stills pointed out the mud from the concert venue still on his pants. Jefferson Airplane's performance of "We Can Be Together" marked the first time the word "fuck" was uttered on television in the US (the actual line is "In order to survive we steal, cheat, lie, forge, fuck, hide and deal". Another line with the forbidden word was "Up against the wall, Up against the wall, motherfucker".). Mitchell sang "Chelsea Morning", "Willy" and "For Free". Grace Slick purposefully called Cavett "Jim" and briefly talked about her school days at Finch College. Stephen Stills performed "4 + 20". Joni Mitchell sang "The Fiddle and the Drum" a cappella. Jefferson Airplane (with Crosby) then launched into "Somebody to Love". The credits rolled as the musicians, without Mitchell, engaged in an instrumental jam as the audience danced.

Jimi Hendrix was scheduled to join the others, but was unable to appear at the afternoon taping that occurred only a few hours after he had performed at the late-running festival. Mitchell's manager, apparently fearing a similar situation that may have prevented her from appearing on the show, did not allow her to perform at Woodstock. He considered the Dick Cavett Show too important for her career for her to risk missing the taping.

Mitchell wrote the song "Woodstock" based on descriptions by Graham Nash and from the images she saw on television, as she could not be there in person. The most famous version of the song is by Crosby, Stills, Nash & Young, who recorded it for their Déjà Vu album (1970). It appears in the film Woodstock during the closing credits. Mitchell recorded it for Ladies of the Canyon (1970).

==== September 5, 1969: Groucho Marx ====
Groucho Marx remarked about the Musical theatre musical Hair, which had just opened and was notorious for its ground-breaking use of explicit nudity: "I was going to go, but I saw myself in the mirror one morning, and I figured, why waste five and a half dollars?" The September 5 program was an expanded version of Marx's June 13 appearance.

==== September 9, 1969: Jimi Hendrix ====
In an interview with Jimi Hendrix, Cavett spoke about Hendrix's performance of the "Star Spangled Banner" at Woodstock, and called the style "unorthodox". Jimi commented that the song was "not unorthodox" and that what he played was beautiful. The audience clapped, and Dick blushed.

Hendrix performed "Izabella" & "Machine Gun" with his band, Billy Cox, Mitch Mitchell and Juma Sultan.

=== 1970s ===
==== February 4, 1970: Judy Collins ====
During an interview with singer Judy Collins in which Cavett and Collins discussed her experiences as a defense witness at the Chicago Seven trial, several of Collins' comments were censored at the direction of the ABC legal department. Collins wrote a protest letter to the Federal Communications Commission (FCC), claiming a violation of her free-speech rights and the network license granted to ABC by the FCC. Her protest was denied, with the FCC ruling that a television network could, at its discretion, delete or edit remarks on its programs. Elton Rule, president of ABC Television, noted that in the network's judgment, "her remarks ... were not within the bounds of fair comment."

==== February 5, 1970: Eric Clapton ====
Blues guitarist Eric Clapton appeared on the show with a new group called Delaney & Bonnie & Friends, which was Clapton's first attempt to break from his lead role and operate as an anonymous sideman. This was also possibly the first time Clapton had appeared on American television with a Fender Stratocaster; up to that time, he was famous for only playing Gibson guitars. Cavett briefly interviewed the band but the shy Clapton did not have much to say.

==== February 19, 1970: Noël Coward, Alfred Lunt, Lynn Fontanne, Tammy Grimes and Brian Bedford ====
To honor Noël Coward on the occasion of his knighthood, Cavett interviewed Coward and his close friends, the Lunts. Tammy Grimes and Brian Bedford, who were appearing on Broadway in a revival of Coward's classic play Private Lives, performed a medley of Coward's most popular songs. At one point during the interview, Cavett asked Coward, "What is the word for when one has terrific, prolific qualities?" to which Coward answered in a deadpan manner, "Talent", drawing a great amount of laughter.

==== April 6, 1970: Mark Frechette and Daria Halprin ====
Actors Mark Frechette and Daria Halprin appeared together with movie producer Mel Brooks and movie critic Rex Reed. The interview went poorly from the outset, with Frechette giving abrupt, non-conversational answers and Halprin staying silent. Cavett apparently believed that they lived in a commune, when they in fact were followers of guru Mel Lyman. When Cavett asked about the "commune" where they lived, Frechette denied that it was a commune and said that "The community is for one purpose, and that's to serve Mel Lyman, who's the leader and founder of that community." At that point, Halprin finally tried to speak, but Cavett went to commercial. When the show returned, the next guest, Dr. Aaron Stern, a Beverly Hills psychiatrist and director of the MPAA's code and rating administration, was brought out, and Frechette and Halprin were not interviewed further.

==== July 27, 1970: Orson Welles ====
Around halfway through Cavett's Orson Welles interview, Welles reversed the roles and began asking Cavett questions about his life and career. This impromptu interview was well received by the audience and, among other things, humorously acknowledged Cavett's talk-show competitors such as Johnny Carson and Merv Griffin.

==== September 18, 1970: John Cassavetes, Peter Falk and Ben Gazzara ====
Director John Cassavetes and actors Peter Falk and Ben Gazzara appeared on the show to promote the movie Husbands. All three guests were highly intoxicated, and "for thirty-five minutes they smoked, flopped around on the floor, and generally tormented Cavett, whose questions they'd planned to ignore." Dick Cavett pronounced it "one of the most interesting evenings of my life."

==== December 18, 1970: Lester Maddox walks off the show ====
Retiring Georgia governor Lester Maddox, appearing in a panel discussion with author Truman Capote and football great Jim Brown, walked off the show in the middle of a conversation about segregation. Cavett had made a reference to the "bigots" who had elected Maddox. Following an exchange about how insulting the remark might have been and Maddox's demand for an apology, Cavett finally apologized to those Georgians who had supported Maddox that might not be bigots. Not satisfied, Maddox left the studio. During the hastily called commercial break, Cavett tried to coax Maddox back to no avail. Cavett suspected that the behavior was mere showmanship and a calculated publicity stunt. The incident was reported on the news before it aired that night, increasing viewership. In Greenwood, Mississippi, the hometown of Cavett's wife Carrie Nye, the guests at a country club dance abandoned the dance floor to watch the show on the TV in the lounge. In Atlanta, then-ABC affiliate WQXI-TV (now WXIA) led with the story on its 11 p.m. newscast, but as it was a Friday night, when the station normally aired movies and delayed Cavett's Friday show to Sunday, Atlanta viewers had to wait until Sunday night to see the incident.

Capote, after watching Maddox walk offstage, paused and quipped, "I've been to his restaurant and his chicken isn't that finger lickin' good." Years later, Cavett said he got more comments about the show (including some 6,000 pieces of hate mail) than any other he had done.

Maddox later returned for another appearance, and this time Cavett walked off as a joke. Left alone on stage, Maddox cued the band and began singing "I Don't Know Why I Love You Like I Do" as Cavett reappeared in the wings to join in.

The walk-off incident is mentioned at the beginning of the Randy Newman song "Rednecks".

==== February 11, 1971: Salvador Dalí, Lillian Gish and Satchel Paige ====
Surrealist artist Salvador Dalí appeared on the show with silent-screen star Lillian Gish and baseball legend Satchel Paige. Dalí brought an anteater on a leash with him when he came on stage, and he tossed it in Gish's lap, much to her consternation.

Cavett asked Dalí why he had once arrived to give a lecture at the Sorbonne in an open limousine filled with heads of cauliflower. Dalí responded with a barely coherent discourse regarding the similarity of the cauliflower head to the "mathematical problem discovered by Michelangelo in the rhinoceros' horn."

Cavett interrupted him by waving his hands in Dalí's face, exclaiming "Boogie boogie!" (imitating Groucho Marx in the film A Night at the Opera). The audience broke up, and Dalí appeared at a loss.

==== April 29, 1971: Robert Mitchum interview ====
Actor Robert Mitchum, known for avoiding public appearances, gave a rare interview as the sole guest. Mitchum talked about his childhood, Hollywood, his disdain for politics and politicians and his 1948 arrest. The show featured film clips from Ryan's Daughter (1970) and The Night of the Hunter (1955).

==== June 7, 1971: J. I. Rodale's on-stage death ====
On June 7, 1971, publisher J. I. Rodale, founder of Rodale, Inc., a health and wellness publishing conglomerate headquartered in Emmaus, Pennsylvania, died of a heart attack during the taping of a segment for the show. Cavett was speaking with journalist Pete Hamill when Rodale began to make a snoring noise. Cavett's immediate reaction has been the subject of conflicting accounts. A 2019 Vanity Fair article reported that authors Jeff Abraham and Burt Kearns reviewed the original recording and the oft-repeated claim that Cavett asked, "Are we boring you, Mr. Rodale?" did not occur. However, in a 2026 interview on the Freakonomics Radio podcast, Cavett stated that he did make the remark before realizing Rodale was in medical distress. The audience did not realize anything was seriously wrong until Cavett asked if there were any medical doctors present.

The program was never aired and a rerun was shown in its place. On the following night's program, Cavett discussed the previous night's event in depth. He has said that he is often approached by people wanting to discuss the incident, mistakenly convinced that they saw it on television. He would usually ask if the person was in the studio audience, which was the only way to witness it since the episode was never broadcast.

==== June 1971: Vietnam War debate with John Kerry ====
During a debate about the Vietnam War, Cavett had two veterans debating on the show. The anti-war side was led by John Kerry and the pro-war side by John E. O'Neill, later the founder of Swift Boat Veterans for Truth. It was later revealed through then-President Richard Nixon's secret White House tapes that Nixon wanted to "get rid" of Cavett because of this debate.

==== August 2, 1971: Ingmar Bergman ====
Director Ingmar Bergman appeared for the first time on a US talk show, one of the few television interviews he ever granted.

==== November 24, 1971: Danny Kaye ====
Actor/singer Danny Kaye appeared for the entire show with film clips, performing and promoting UNICEF.

==== December 15, 1971: Norman Mailer vs. Gore Vidal ====
Moments before the episode with Gore Vidal, Norman Mailer and Janet Flanner, Mailer, annoyed with Vidal's less-than-stellar review of Prisoner of Sex, headbutted Vidal and traded insults with him backstage. As the show began taping, a visibly belligerent Mailer, who admitted he had been drinking, goaded Vidal and Cavett into trading insults with him on air and continually referred to his "greater intellect". He openly taunted and mocked Vidal (who responded in kind), finally earning the ire of Flanner, who announced that she had become "very, very bored" with the discussion, telling Mailer and Vidal "You act as if you're the only people here." Mailer moved his chair away from the other guests and Cavett joked that "perhaps you'd like two more chairs to contain your giant intellect?" Mailer replied "I'll take the two chairs if you'll all accept finger bowls." As Cavett professed to not understand Mailer's "finger bowl" comment and made further jokes, Mailer stated "Why don't you look at your question sheet and ask your question?", to which Cavett responded "Why don't you fold it five ways and put it where the moon don't shine?"

A long laugh by the audience ensued, after which Mailer asked Cavett if he had "come up with that line himself". Cavett replied, "I have to tell you a quote from Tolstoy?"

The headbutting and later on-air altercation was described by Mailer in his short book Of a Small and Modest Malignancy, Wicked and Bristling with Dots, including a description that does not jibe with the videotape and which was disputed by Cavett decades later in his New York Times online column. Cavett noted that Mailer said that he received more mail about this episode than for anything else in his career.

==== 1971: John Simon vs. Mort Sahl ====
Critic John Simon revealed on the air that during the most recent commercial break, fellow guest Mort Sahl had threatened to punch him in the mouth.

==== 1971: The pornography episodes ====
Cavett did a two-part show on pornography; both parts were taped the same day and shown on two nights. During the first part, he discussed the depiction of oral sex in movies and made a parenthetical utterance: "oral-genital sex...mouth on sex organs." A flap ensued when executives demanded that the censor cut the second phrase.

An angry Cavett described the ongoing situation at the beginning of the second part, reusing the phrase. One of the guests, legal scholar Alexander Bickel, sided with Cavett. The result was that the show aired with the phrase cut the first night but intact for the second night.

==== 1972–1974 and beyond: Watergate ====
During and following the Watergate scandal, which resulted in the resignation of President Richard Nixon, Cavett's guests included:

- Barry Goldwater, senior Republican Senator from Arizona
- G. Gordon Liddy, former FBI agent, one of the head White House Plumbers one of the original Watergate Seven
- Richard Kleindienst, Attorney General succeeding John N. Mitchell and followed by Elliot Richardson
- Bob Woodward and Carl Bernstein, Washington Post metropolitan writers and Watergate investigative reporters
- Walter Cronkite, CBS Evening News anchor who aired segments on Watergate using Woodward and Bernstein's Washington Post coverage
- John Ehrlichman, Nixon chief domestic policy advisor and one of the later Watergate Seven
- Jeb Magruder, CRP coordinator turned witness
- John Dean, Nixon White House counsel and cover-up coordinator turned star witness
- Members of the Senate Watergate Committee in charge of the Watergate hearings
  - Chairman Sam Ervin (D-NC)
  - Vice chairman Howard Baker (R-TN) and members Lowell Weicker (R-CT), Daniel Inouye (D-HI) and Herman Talmadge (D-GA) in the Senate Caucus Room with an audience
- Gore Vidal
- Gerald Ford, House Minority Leader, Vice President following Spiro Agnew's resignation and President following Nixon's resignation
- Henry Kissinger, National Security Advisor and Secretary of State

It later emerged from the Nixon White House tapes that Cavett was viewed as an enemy by Nixon and thus had staff who had taxes audited in retaliation. Cavett was mentioned 26 times in the White House tapes. Cavett's Watergate coverage and interviews were later spotlighted in a PBS documentary called Dick Cavett's Watergate featuring Cavett, Woodward, Bernstein, Dean and former Nixon Presidential Library director Timothy Naftali.

==== March 31, 1972: Chad Everett vs. Lily Tomlin ====
During the taping of this episode, actor Chad Everett upset feminist actress/comedian Lily Tomlin. Tomlin became so enraged when Everett referred to his wife as "my property" that she stormed off the set and refused to return.

==== June 27, 1972: Angela Davis ====
Angela Davis, an activist who was associated with the Black Panther Party in the 1960s and 1970s, cancelled a scheduled appearance on June 27, 1972. The basis for the controversy was the continuing debate over the SST (supersonic transport) system. ABC had insisted on inviting either William F. Buckley, Jr. or William Rusher of the conservative National Review magazine to have a balanced viewpoint, but Davis declined.

==== 1972: Rogers Morton ====
A show with Secretary of the Interior Rogers Morton resulted in nine animals being added to the endangered species list after Cavett commented on them.

==== June 12, 1973: Marlon Brando ====
Marlon Brando, who just months earlier had rejected his Academy Award for The Godfather to protest the plight of American Indians, appeared on the show with representatives of the Cheyenne, Paiute and Lummi tribes to promote his views. After the program ended, Brando assaulted photographer Ron Galella, who ended up in the hospital after being punched in the face.

==== October 1973: Katharine Hepburn two-hour interview ====
Having previously never appeared on television, Katharine Hepburn—for reasons still unknown—decided to visit Cavett's studio for a tour. After critiquing the carpet and rearranging the set, Hepburn suggested they "go ahead and do it now." During her two-part interview, Hepburn got up and left at the end of the first half of the interview, thinking her job was done. Cavett apologized to the audience, promising that she would be back the next evening (she was). However, this was actually staged by Cavett and Hepburn as a joke.

==== February 21, 1974: Carol Burnett interview ====
Actress Carol Burnett appeared and was interviewed for the entire 90-minute program.

==== 1979: Oscar Peterson ====
Pianist Oscar Peterson expertly demonstrated the styles of Art Tatum, Erroll Garner, Nat King Cole and George Shearing. The show began with Peterson playing a solo piece and he then discussed his debut and his view on critics.

=== 1980s ===
==== October 1980: Jean-Luc Godard ====
Filmmaker Jean-Luc Godard appeared in two 1980 episodes promoting the film Every Man for Himself and discussing his philosophy of filmmaking. These are included as supplements on the Criterion Collection's DVD and Blu-ray releases of the film.

== Home media ==
Five DVD sets have been released featuring various episodes of the series.

DVD name	Release date	Number of episodes	Additional information
The Dick Cavett Show: Jimi Hendrix	May 14, 2002	2	This one-disc set features two episodes with three songs performed live by Jimi Hendrix. Bonus features include an interview with Dick Cavett, Billy Cox, Mitch Mitchell and others.
The Dick Cavett Show: Rock Icons	August 16, 2005	9	This three-disc set features nine episodes including appearances by David Bowie, David Crosby, George Harrison, Janis Joplin, Jefferson Airplane, The Jessy Dixon Singers, Joni Mitchell, Jimi Hendrix, The Rolling Stones, Ravi Shankar, Paul Simon, Sly & the Family Stone, Stephen Stills, Stevie Wonder, Wonderwheel and Gary Wright. Bonus features include Bob Weide's interview of Cavett.
The Dick Cavett Show: Ray Charles Collection	September 13, 2005	3	This two-disc set features three episodes with 14 songs performed live by Ray Charles. Bonus features include new episode introductions and an interview with Cavett.
The Dick Cavett Show: John & Yoko Collection	November 1, 2005	3	This two-disc set features three John Lennon and Yoko Ono appearances from 1971 to 1972. Bonus features include new episode introductions and an interview with Cavett.
The Dick Cavett Show: Comic Legends	February 21, 2006	12	This four-disc set features 12 episodes with interviews with Woody Allen, Lucille Ball, Jack Benny, Carol Burnett, Mel Brooks, George Burns, Bill Cosby, Bob Hope, Jerry Lewis, Groucho Marx and the Smothers Brothers. Bonus features include new episode introductions, Cavett Remembers The Comic Legends with Bob Weide, an interview with Joanne Carson, Dick Cavett on The Ed Sullivan Show, Cavett Backstage featurette, promos, outtakes and Here's Dick Cavette, a 30-minute special featuring footage from The Dick Cavett Morning Show with Groucho Marx, Bob Hope and Woody Allen. This DVD set also includes the interview with Mark Frechette and Daria Halprin.
The Dick Cavett Show: Hollywood Greats	September 12, 2006	12	This four-disc set features 12 episodes from the series featuring interviews with Robert Altman, Fred Astaire, Peter Bogdanovich, Marlon Brando, Mel Brooks, Frank Capra, Bette Davis, Kirk Douglas, Katharine Hepburn, Alfred Hitchcock, John Huston, Groucho Marx, Robert Mitchum, Debbie Reynolds and Orson Welles. Bonus features include new episode introductions, promos, and the featurette Seeing Stars with Dick Cavett and Robert Osborne.

== Resurgence ==
Global Image Works, the current owner of the footage of the show, has made a YouTube channel with clips from it. It launched on June 7, 2018. As of December 2025, the channel has over 162 million views. News outlets have covered clips from the show, mostly because of the celebrities. HBO released a documentary called Ali and Cavett: The Tale of Tapes, which is about Muhammad Ali's friendship with him, making the show even more popular in the 2020s.

Reruns of the show currently air weeknights on the Decades cable network, though 90-minute episodes have been cut to fit a one-hour slot, and musical performances are almost always removed, presumably for licensing reasons. However, as of March 27, 2023, it will no longer be shown on Decades as it rebrands itself as Catchy Comedy.

== In popular culture ==
In a scene from Annie Hall (1977), Woody Allen appears on the show in character as comedian Alvy Singer, with Cavett interviewing. In Forrest Gump (1994), the titular character appears on The Dick Cavett Show with John Lennon. The creation of this scene was achieved via the use of ground-breaking special visual effects. Both films wound up winning the Academy Award for Best Picture.

The Dick Cavett Show is depicted in the first-season finale of BoJack Horseman, where a young BoJack watches Cavett interview Secretariat.

The set of The Adam Friedland Show is a replica of The Dick Cavett Show set.

Rick Moranis parodies Dick Cavett on the comedy series Second City Television.

== See also ==
- List of late night network TV programs
