= Kevin M. Scott =

American geologist, author

- Born: 1935 (age 90–91)
- Other name: Kevin Scott
- Occupation: Geologist
- Employer: United States Geological Survey
- Awards: Kirk Bryan Award

Academic background
- Education: University of California, Los Angeles (B, M); University of Wisconsin, Madison (PhD)

Academic work
- Institutions: Volcano Science Center, Cascades Volcano Observatory
- Influenced: Kevin Islands
- Website: volcanicdisasters.com

Kevin M. Scott is an American geologist, author, and fellow of the Geological Society of America (GSA). Scott is a Scientist Emeritus for the United States Geological Survey (USGS). The Kevin Islands of Antarctica are named after him.

== Personal life ==
According to Library of Congress Cataloging in Publication Data, (Note: Many libraries using the LOC data list his birth year along with his name in cataloging information, including Indiana State Library, UChi Library, Linda Hall Library, Stanford Libraries, UR Libraries, Chicago Public Library, and the Online Books Page.) Scott was born in 1935.

Scott received a master's and a bachelor's degree at UCLA, and a PhD at UW-Madison.

== Career ==
Scott has published works about geology from many regions around the world, including Mount Baker and Mount Rainier, Washington; Pinatubo, Philippines, Gerlache Strait, Antarctica, and multiple locations in China. He visited Dongchuan, China (in the Jiangjiagou Valley) in 1991 and 92, as well as in 2010, to be involved with the Dongchuan Debris Flow Observation and Research Station. Scott chaired a 2004 GSA Penrose Conference session, Sector collapse, avalanches, and lahars. He was also a convener of the 2007 GSA Cordilleran Section (a GSA event in Portland, Oregon co-convened by Dave Tucker). He also ran a book signing event at the 2019 GSA Cordilleran Section.

Scott has published extensively on the geology of the Puget Lowlands and Cascade Range volcanoes including Mount St. Helens. His work was covered by the New York Times in 1987.

Scott has worked with multiple notable geologists, including Tucker, and fellow Kirk Bryan Award winners Jon J. Major and William B. Bull.

Scott is the author of the book The Voice of This Stone, detailing the events of different volcanic events from throughout history. After the book was published, Scott was picked up by a local newspaper, The Columbian, who published a story on his geologic research work, and noted that he hails from the city of Portland, Oregon.

=== Awards ===
- 1989: Kirk Bryan Award (GSA)
- 2005-6: Partners-in-Science Award (M.J. Murdock Charitable Trust)

=== Memberships and affiliations ===
- 2011: board of directors, Mount Baker Volcano Research Center (MBVRC) (Note: Under MBVRC director Dave Tucker)
- Associate Editor in Chief, Journal of Mountain Science
