= My Generation (American game show) =

- Country of origin: United States
- No. of episodes: 48

Original release
- Network: VH1
- Release: 1998

My Generation is a game show on VH1 that was hosted by comedian Craig Shoemaker and announced by Lindsay Stoddart. Its 48 episodes aired for a brief period in 1998, and due to its similar format and emphasis on music is considered to be a semi-revival of the 1969 ABC series The Generation Gap.

== Format ==
Two pairs of players from different graduation years – 1960 to 1995, typically 10–20 years apart – competed in a game of musical knowledge for a chance to win a grand prize.

=== The Singles Round ===
Five categories were displayed, each with a question set for both teams' generations, and the winners of a coin toss chose the first set. Questions frequently had a brief skit or performance associated with them, similar to the MTV game show Remote Control.

The first question in a set was asked as a toss-up open for all players to buzz-in individually. A correct answer awarded 50 points and the right to play a follow-up question for 100 points if desired, directed at the partner of the player who had answered the toss-up. If the partner answered the follow-up correctly, the team was asked a 200-point bonus question. A miss on any question passed control to the opponents and allowed them to answer if they chose; missing the toss-up or follow-up also deducted the relevant amount from a team's score.

A question set went out of play as soon as any of the following occurred:

- Both teams missed the same question
- One team missed a question and their opponents chose not to attempt it
- The team that scored on the toss-up declined the follow-up
- Different teams answered the toss-up and follow-up correctly
- The bonus question was asked

The team in control then chose a new set. The round continued until time ran out or all 10 question sets had been played, whichever came first.

A bonus prize was awarded to any team that chose a question set from their opponents' generation and answered the toss-up correctly (referred to as "crossing generations").

=== The CD Round ===
This round followed the same rules as Round 1, with all point values doubled and the trailing team choosing first from a new board of categories. Each team was given one Dedication to use during this round, which allowed them to force their opponents to answer a question meant for them. If the opponents missed, they were penalized appropriately and the team using the Dedication also received the points at stake; if the opponents answered correctly, they scored for the question instead.

=== Speed Round ===
The host read the combined names of two bands or songs (one from each team's generation), each with the same word missing, and the teams had to buzz-in and give the word. (Example: "C+C Roxy Factory" would lead to MUSIC, for C+C Music Factory and Roxy Music.) A correct answer awarded 200 points, while a miss deducted 200. The time limit for this round was variously 30 or 45 seconds; when time ran out, the team in the lead won a prize and advanced to the Time Warp bonus round.

In some episodes, the teams were shown the names of two bands and had to give the title of a song released by both of them, or had to identify which of two similarly named bands recorded a particular song.

=== Bonus Round: The Time Warp ===
One team member was shown the name of one of 10 bands and had to give clues of no more than two words to get their partner to guess it. Illegal clues (more than two words, using any portion of the name, etc.) forfeited that band. Bands started in the winning team's generation and moved gradually toward that of their defeated opponents. Either team member could pass on a band, and multiple guesses were allowed. The team won the grand prize for identifying seven bands within 60 seconds, with a smaller prize awarded for each correct guess.
