= Jo Coppola =

- Born: Josephine Coppola; February 22, 1920; Brooklyn, New York, U.S.
- Died: October 22, 1982 (aged 62)
- Education: Holy Name School; Bay Ridge High School
- Occupation: Newspaper columnist
- Years active: 1944 - 1959

Josephine "Jo" Coppola (February 22, 1920 – October 22, 1982) was a prominent 1950s American columnist and television critic, (Note: Lest the word "prominent" be viewed as simply editorial puffery (a not unfounded suspicion, considering how far Coppola's star had apparently fallen by the time of her unreported passing in 1982), an amusing, yet dramatic illustration of that prominence–which, evidently, Coppola continued to enjoy, at least amongst her peers, for at least a decade past her last published byline—was provided, albeit unwittingly, in 1969, when, amidst widespread reports of an upcoming Heaven Can Wait remake (pairing writer-director Francis Ford Coppola and star Bill Cosby), another noted TV columnist / critic, Charles Witbeck (who, although Coppola's contemporary, had started in the business roughly a decade later, in 1953, affiliated primarily with King Features Syndicate), inadvertently described yet another upcoming Cosby-Coppola collaboration—likewise never realized—as being directed by "the young Frances Jo Coppola".) employed by Newsday and the New York Post. She was the first TV critic Newsday ever had, and also wrote for Commonweal, and others. (Note: Coppola’s byline appeared on at least two occasions in the New York Daily News.)

== Early life and career ==
Born and raised in Brooklyn, Coppola was the youngest of six children born to Anna (née Capiello) and watchmaker Francesco Coppola. A frequent correspondent with columnist / children's author Elsie-Jean, Coppola attended Holy Name School and Bay Ridge High School, graduating in 1938.

In 1959 she wrote the script for the short film Summer of Decision, a 30-minute-long film produced by the Council on Social Work Education, directed by William A. Graham and starring Suzanne Pleshette, Kevin McCarthy and Nicholas Pryor.

In April 1973, Coppola, along with William Casselman, Nathan W. Goldstein, and Arthur Sylvester, was named to the Board of Governors of the Society of the Silurians.

== Death ==
Coppola died at the age of 62, on October 22, 1982.

== Notable quotations ==
- Good comedy is social criticism—although you might find that hard to believe if all you ever saw were some of the so-called clowns of videoland.... Comedy is dying today because criticism is on its deathbed ... because telecasters, frightened by the threats and pressure of sponsors, blacklists and viewers, helped introduce conformity to this age... In such a climate, comedy cannot flourish. For comedy is, after all, a look at ourselves, not as we pretend to be when we look in the mirror of our imagination, but as we really are. Look at the comedy of any age and you will know volumes about that period and its people which neither historian nor anthropologist can tell you.
  — as quoted in The Realist issue 1, 1958
- "Please be assured...of our continued efforts to avoid giving offense to any segment of our viewing public." [...] this edict would mean death for true comedy. A comedian, for instance, could satirize war only if he didn't offend nuclear scientists, the Army, the Navy, the Marines, the State Department, certain businessmen and our veterans... true comedy... must induce self-laughter, which is nothing but mature criticism. Since we live in an age when criticism is not welcome, is it any wonder then that true comedy, which reflects its age, is dying?
  — Commonweal
