= Vincent Saint John =

American activist (1876–1929)

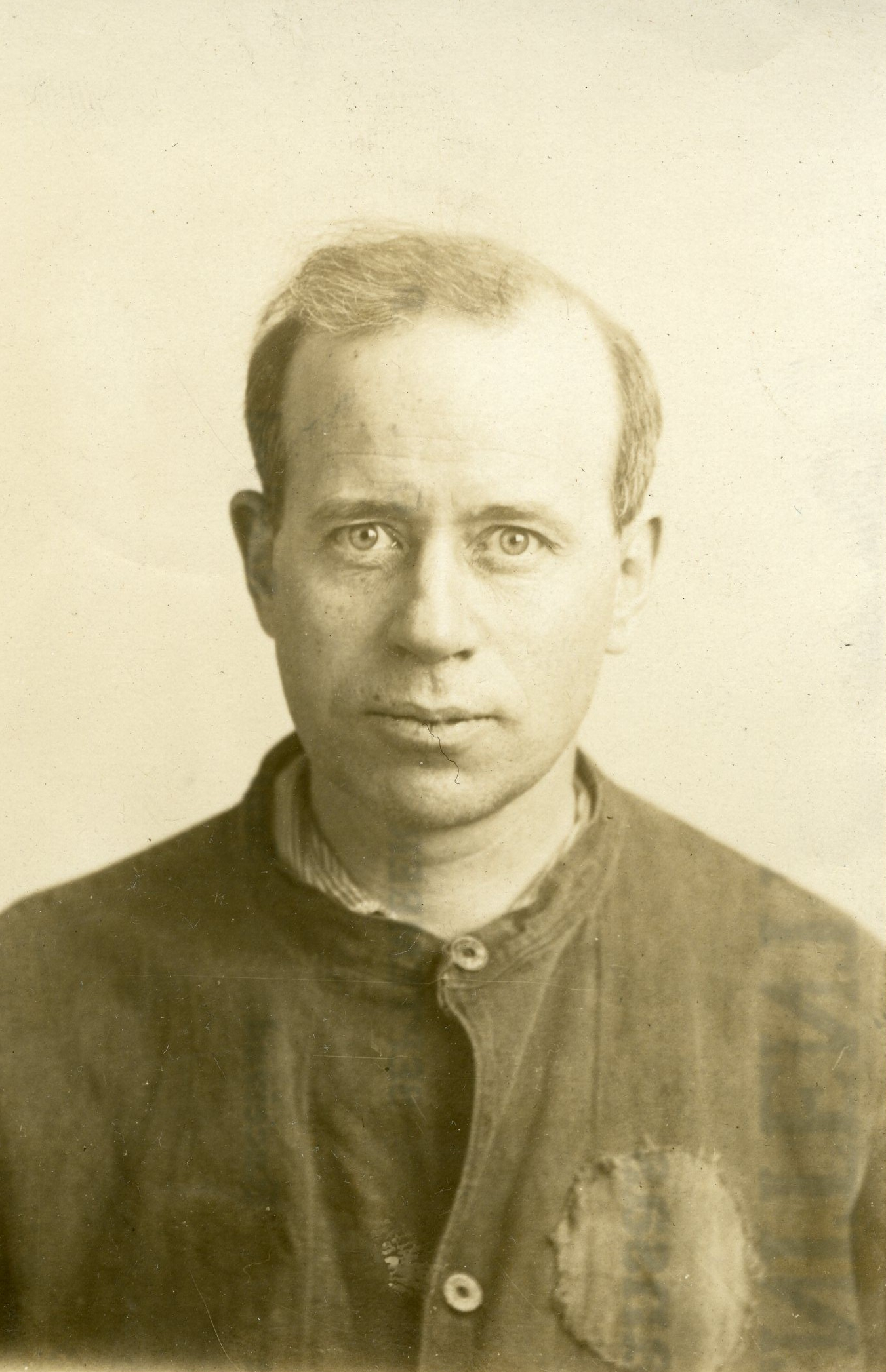
- Saint John's Leavenworth Penitentiary mugshot, September 1918

2nd General Secretary-Treasurer of the Industrial Workers of the World
- In office January 1909 – December 1914
- Preceded by: William E. Trautmann
- Succeeded by: Bill Haywood

Personal details
- Born: 1876 Newport, Kentucky, U.S.
- Died: 1929 (aged 52–53) San Francisco, California, U.S.
- Resting place: Oakland, California
- Parent(s): Silas St. John and "Mary" Cecilia Magee
- Occupation: Miner, Labor leader

Vincent Saint John (1876–1929) was an American labor leader and prominent Wobbly, among the most influential radical labor leaders of the 20th century.

== Biography ==
Vincent St. John was born in Newport, Kentucky and was the only son of New York City native Silas St. John and Irish immigrant Marian "Mary" Cecilia Magee. He had a sister two years younger named Helen.

The family moved frequently, Silas going wherever he could to find employment as a clerk or bookkeeper. St. John worked as a miner from the age of seventeen, moving to Telluride, Colorado in 1897. In 1900 St. John became president of the Western Federation of Miners' Union Local 63 at Telluride. He led the 1901 strike in that mining camp to a successful conclusion, gaining a standard minimum wage for the miners.

He was shadowed by Pinkertons hired by the Mine Operators' Association, stalked by gunmen, had a price on his head, was arrested and charged with crimes he never committed, and was condemned by the anti-labor press as a "murderer."

Bulkeley Wells, a Telluride mining company president and manager who was "born to privilege... [and was] convinced laborers were beneath him," was intent upon hanging St. John. Wells conspired with others, including Pinkerton manager James McParland, to accuse the head of the WFM local of conducting a "reign of terror" — and in particular, of murdering William J. Barney, a mine guard who had left his post. There was one significant complicating factor: Barney was not dead, but had merely failed to notify anyone that he had left.

On 5 November 1907 St. John was shot in Goldfield, Nevada by a conservative member of the Western Federation of Miners. The two bullets in his right wrist shattered the bone, crippling his hand. St. John was an organizer for the Industrial Workers of the World and in 1908–1914 he led that union as the General Secretary. In January 1915 he retired to a small copper claim in New Mexico, but was later arrested for a May 1918 mass trial as the federal government brought sweeping indictments against 101 IWW members. St. John was not a member at that time, but the blanket indictments of hundreds of Wobblies brought blanket convictions, and St. John was sentenced to federal prison at Leavenworth. He was freed by President Warren G. Harding in 1923.

Vincent St. John died in San Francisco in June 1929 following a protracted illness. He is buried in Oakland, California.
