= Fred W. Thompson =

Labor organizer

- Born: Frederick Willard Thompson; June 5, 1900; Saint John, New Brunswick, Canada
- Died: March 9, 1987 (aged 86); Chicago, Illinois, United States
- Resting place: Oakridge Cemetery, Hillside, Illinois
- Occupation: Labor leader and historian

Frederick Willard Thompson (5 June 1900 – 9 March 1987) was a Canadian-American labor organizer and historian. A member of the Industrial Workers of the World (IWW) for 65 years, he was first elected to the General Executive Board in 1928. He served in various capacities for the organization, including as the General Secretary-Treasurer of the Industrial Workers of the World from March 1936 to February 1937 and as editor of the IWW's primary newspaper, the Industrial Worker. In a 1987 obituary published by Labour/Le Travail, scholar and poet Franklin Rosemont described Thompson as "the most influential Wobbly since the 1930s."

== Early life ==
Born in 1900 in Saint John, New Brunswick to Frederick Sommerville Thompson and Florence Adelaide Olive, he was the youngest of seven children.

== Labor organizing ==
He became interested in politics at an early age and was an organizer for the Socialist Party of Canada as a teenager during World War I. He was then an iterant worker and traveled throughout Canada. In 1920, he joined the One Big Union, a syndicalist labor union while in Winnipeg. In 1922, he moved to the west coast of the United States and joined the Industrial Workers of the World. He was arrested later that year in Marysville, California for distributing Wobbly literature. He spent five years in San Quentin State Prison (1922–1927) alongside many other labor radicals. After leaving San Quentin, he organized workers in a number of industries throughout the midwestern United States. He was denied U.S. citizenship because of his politics but, after nearly two decades in court, he was granted citizenship in 1964.

== Historian ==
Thompson was one of the first historians of the IWW. In 1955, he published The I. W. W., Its First Fifty Years, 1905-1955: The History of an Effort to Organize the Working Class. An updated version of the book was published in 1975. In the 1960s, Thompson was part of a group which re-established the Charles H. Kerr Publishing Company. It had been one of the leading publishers of leftist books from its founding in 1886 until the 1930s but had declined during the middle of the century. He was a co-founder of the Illinois Labor Historical Society. His papers, which "reflect his involvement with the IWW and his interest in preserving its history," are held by the Walter P. Reuther Library at Wayne State University in Detroit, Michigan.

== Later life ==
Thompson was active in the Industrial Workers of the World until his death in 1987. He spoke about his experiences to numerous student groups across the U.S. and Canada. He is buried at Oakridge Cemetery in Hillside, Illinois near Chicago. After his death, Kerr published Fellow Worker: The Life of Fred Thompson which is an autobiography compiled by historian David Roediger from Thompson's published writings and his recollections to the author.

== Bibliography ==
- The I. W. W., its first fifty years, 1905-1955; the history of an effort to organize the working class. Industrial Workers of the World. 1955.
- The I. W. W., Its First Seventy Years, 1905-1975: The History of an Effort to Organize the Working Class: a Corrected Facsimile of the 1955 Volume, The I.W.W., Its First Fifty Years. Industrial Workers of the World. 1975. ISBN 978-0-917124-03-7.
- Fellow worker : the life of Fred Thompson. Chicago: Charles H. Kerr Pub. Co. 1993. ISBN 9780882862200.
- The I.W.W.: Its First One Hundred Years, 1905-2005: the history of an effort to organize the working class. Industrial Workers of the World. 2005. ISBN 978-0-917124-02-0. OCLC 938164700.
