= Arthur G. Sylvester =

American geologist

Arthur Gibbs Sylvester (February 16, 1938-May 2, 2023) was an American structural geologist. He was an emeritus professor of geology at the University of California, Santa Barbara and the author of Roadside Geology of Southern California (2016) and the second edition of Geology Underfoot in Southern California (2020), both published by Mountain Press. The Geological Society of America announced he was to be awarded the Structure and Tectonics Division's Career Contribution Award at their 2023 Fall Meeting.
