= Riot (novel) =

1922 novel by William Trautmann

- Author: William Trautmann
- Language: English
- Genre: Novel, Proletarian literature
- Publisher: Chicago Labor Printing Company
- Publication date: 1922
- Publication place: United States
- Media type: Print (Hardback)
- Pages: 338
- OCLC: 7956115

Riot is an historical novel based upon the Pressed Steel Car Strike of 1909 by William Trautmann, a founder of the United States Industrial Workers of the World (IWW).
