= Late Night America =

Late Night America, formerly PBS LateNight is PBS's first nationally broadcast talk and viewer phone-in television program, hosted by Dennis Wholey in Detroit. It premiered January 4, 1982.
