= Journal of Mountain Science =

- Discipline: Environmental Sciences, Earth sciences, Engineering geology
- Language: English
- Edited by: Peng Cui, Dunlian Qiu

Publication details
- History: 2004-present
- Publisher: Springer Science+Business Media
- Frequency: monthly
- Open access: Hybrid
- Impact factor: 2.5 (2024)

Standard abbreviations
- ISO 4: J. Mt. Sci.

Indexing
- ISSN: 1672-6316 (print); 1993-0321 (web)
- OCLC no.: 938745963

Links
- Journal homepage; Online archive

The Journal of Mountain Science is a monthly peer-reviewed scientific journal covering research on natural and anthropogenic environmental changes and sustainable development in mountain areas. The journal also publishes book reviews and reports on mountain research and introductions to mountain research organizations. The journal was established in 2004, sponsored by the Chengdu Institute of Mountain Hazards and Environment, under supervision of the Chinese Academy of Sciences. It is published by Springer Science+Business Media. The editor-in-chief is Peng Cui; the executive editor-in-chief is Dunlian Qiu.

== Abstracting and indexing ==
The Journal of Mountain Science is abstracted and indexed in:

- CAB International
- AGRICOLA
- Current Contents/Engineering, Computing & Technology
- Current Contents/Physical, Chemical & Earth Sciences
- CSCD
- EBSCO databases
- GEOBASE
- GeoRef
- InfoTrac databases
- Inspec
- ProQuest databases
- Referativny Zhurnal
- Science Citation Index Expanded
- Scopus

According to the 2018 Journal Citation Reports, the journal has a 2017 impact factor of 1.135.
