= Fred Foy =

American actor (1921–2010)

Frederick William Foy
- Born: March 21, 1921; Detroit, Michigan
- Died: December 22, 2010 (aged 89); Woburn, Massachusetts
- Military career
- Allegiance: United States
- Branch: United States Army
- Service years: 1942–1946
- Rank: Corporal
- Unit: 14th Special Service Company
- Conflicts: World War II
- Other work: Radio and television announcer

Frederick William Foy (March 27, 1921 – December 22, 2010) was an American radio and television announcer and actor. He is best known for his narration of The Lone Ranger. Radio historian Jim Harmon described Foy as "the announcer, perhaps the greatest announcer-narrator in the history of radio drama."

Shortly after graduating from high school in 1938, Foy began in broadcasting with a part-time position at WMBC, a 250-watt independent station in Detroit. He moved to WXYZ in 1942, but World War II interrupted his radio career.

== World War II ==
He was inducted August 28, 1942, entering the American armed forces September 11, 1942. Attached to the 14th Special Service Company, Sergeant Fred Foy became the American voice on Egyptian State Broadcasting, delivering news and special programs to the Allied Forces in Cairo. He handled the distribution throughout the Middle East of American recordings, in addition to local broadcasts of Command Performance, Mail Call, Personal Album, Radio Bric-a-Brac and Front Line Theatre. He also announced The American Forces Programme. For Stars and Stripes he did American News Letter, a weekly summary of news from America, plus sport flashes and items from various theatres of war. For Cairo cinemas, he announced Headline News of the Day. Foy helped stage and announce USO sponsored programs, including a Jack Benny broadcast from Cairo to New York and an Andre Kostelanetz concert with Lily Pons.

Foy scripted his own shows, including Up To Scratch, a lively program of the current hit tunes, and Shows on Parade, which he hosted. When he wrote and directed Christmas Overseas, broadcast from the Church of the Nativity in Bethlehem, in the Holy Land it received top honors from Washington. Featuring Christmas music by the Franciscan Boys’ Orphanage Choir, the program opened with a Christmas story offering reasons for fighting the War. Working with Stars and Stripes, he created and announced a program airing World Series play-by-play to GIs. He also scripted, directed and acted with the American Red Cross during the 1945 War Fund Campaign. Foy received a commendation for voluntarily remaining at his post during the hours from August 10, 1945, until final August 15 confirmation of the Japanese surrender, making the latest news available at all times during the news emergency prior to the surrender. He was discharged on January 3, 1946, at Camp Atterbury in Indiana.

== Radio ==
After the war, Foy returned to WXYZ in Detroit. He took over the position of announcer and narrator for radio's The Lone Ranger beginning July 2, 1948 and continuing until the series ended on September 3, 1954. He understudied the title role and stepped into the part on March 29, 1954, when Brace Beemer had laryngitis. His long run as announcer and narrator of The Lone Ranger made the Foy's distinctive voice a radio trademark. He was also heard on radio's The Green Hornet and Challenge of the Yukon.

His stentorian delivery of the program's lead-in thrilled his audience for years and helped the program achieve even greater popularity and status. Most radio historians agree that Foy's Lone Ranger introduction is the most recognized opening in American radio:

Hi-Yo, Silver! A fiery horse with the speed of light, a cloud of dust and a hearty "Hi-Yo Silver"... The Lone Ranger! With his faithful Indian companion, Tonto, the daring and resourceful masked rider of the plains led the fight for law and order in the early Western United States. Nowhere in the pages of history can one find a greater champion of justice. Return with us now to those thrilling days of yesteryear. From out of the past come the thundering hoof-beats of the great horse Silver. The Lone Ranger rides again!

== Television ==
In 1955, Foy reprised his famous "Return with us now..." opening narration for The Lone Ranger television series (1949–57) in syndication (Actor Gerald Mohr did the opening narration in the original network run). In 1961, Foy joined the ABC announcing staff in New York. For ABC Television he spent five years as announcer and on-camera commercial spokesman for The Dick Cavett Show. He was also the announcer for The Generation Gap and other network quiz shows. For ABC Radio he narrated the award-winning news documentary, Voices in the Headlines, as well as serving as host and narrator for the ABC's radio drama series, Theatre 5 (1964–65). He narrated network documentary specials in tribute to Sir Winston Churchill, John F. Kennedy, Herbert Hoover and others.

As spokesman for national advertisers, Foy represented Colgate, General Motors and Sinclair. Foy, who was also heard doing newscasts on WABC radio in New York, stayed with ABC until 1985. He was also the voiceover for the fall promo on NET in 1966.

Additionally, Mr. Foy was the on-air announcer for several Miss America pageant telecasts in the 1980s which were held in Atlantic City, New Jersey.

== Awards ==
Fred Foy was inducted into the National Radio Hall of Fame in March 2000 and received the Golden Boot Award from the Motion Picture and Television Fund in August 2004.

Foy performed his "Return with us now..." Lone Ranger opening narration live at the Hollywood Bowl in August 2000, with the Hollywood Bowl Orchestra and conductor John Mauceri. In 1986, he wrote his autobiography, Fred Foy from XYZ to ABC: A Fond Recollection, and he has also released a 45-minute CD/cassette of memories, Meanwhile, Back at the Ranch.

== Death ==
Fred Foy died on December 21, 2010, of natural causes.

== Listen to ==
- Fred Foy's Lone Ranger edited for TV opening
- Leonard Lopate interviews Fred Foy
