= Dennis Wholey =

American TV host and producer (born 1939)

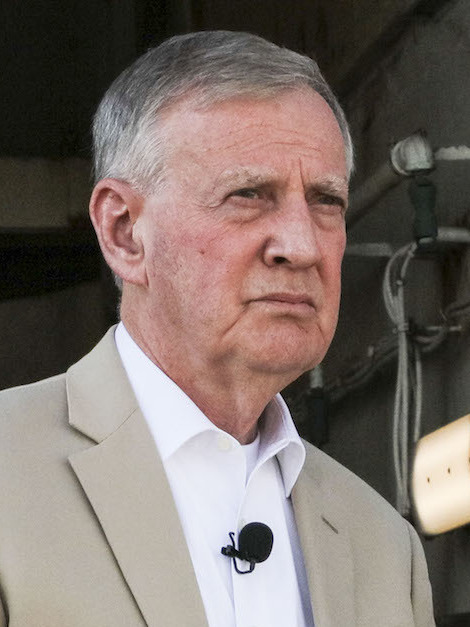
- Wholey in 2017
- Born: July 2, 1939 (age 87); Cranston, Rhode Island, U.S.
- Education: B.A., Catholic University of America (1959)
- Occupations: Television host/producer, news anchor
- Years active: 1960-present

Dennis Wholey (born July 2, 1939) is an American television host and producer, and the author of a number of self-help books, one of which was a New York Times bestseller. He currently hosts This is America & The World with Dennis Wholey, an interview program shown throughout the U.S. on public television stations and distributed worldwide on Voice of America Television.

== Life and career ==
The son of an attorney father and a librarian mother, Wholey received a B.A. degree from the Catholic University of America in 1959. He started his media career as a tour guide for NBC in New York City and then became the host of a radio talk show, The Age of Involvement, on WBAI-FM. He also produced and hosted a television talk show on WNDT-TV in New York. In 1969, Wholey moved to WKRC-TV in Cincinnati, where he hosted The Dennis Wholey Show, which was syndicated to stations throughout the midwest, including Taft Broadcasting Company sister station WTVN-TV in Columbus. In 1969 he was the emcee of a short-lived game show, The Generation Gap, on ABC.

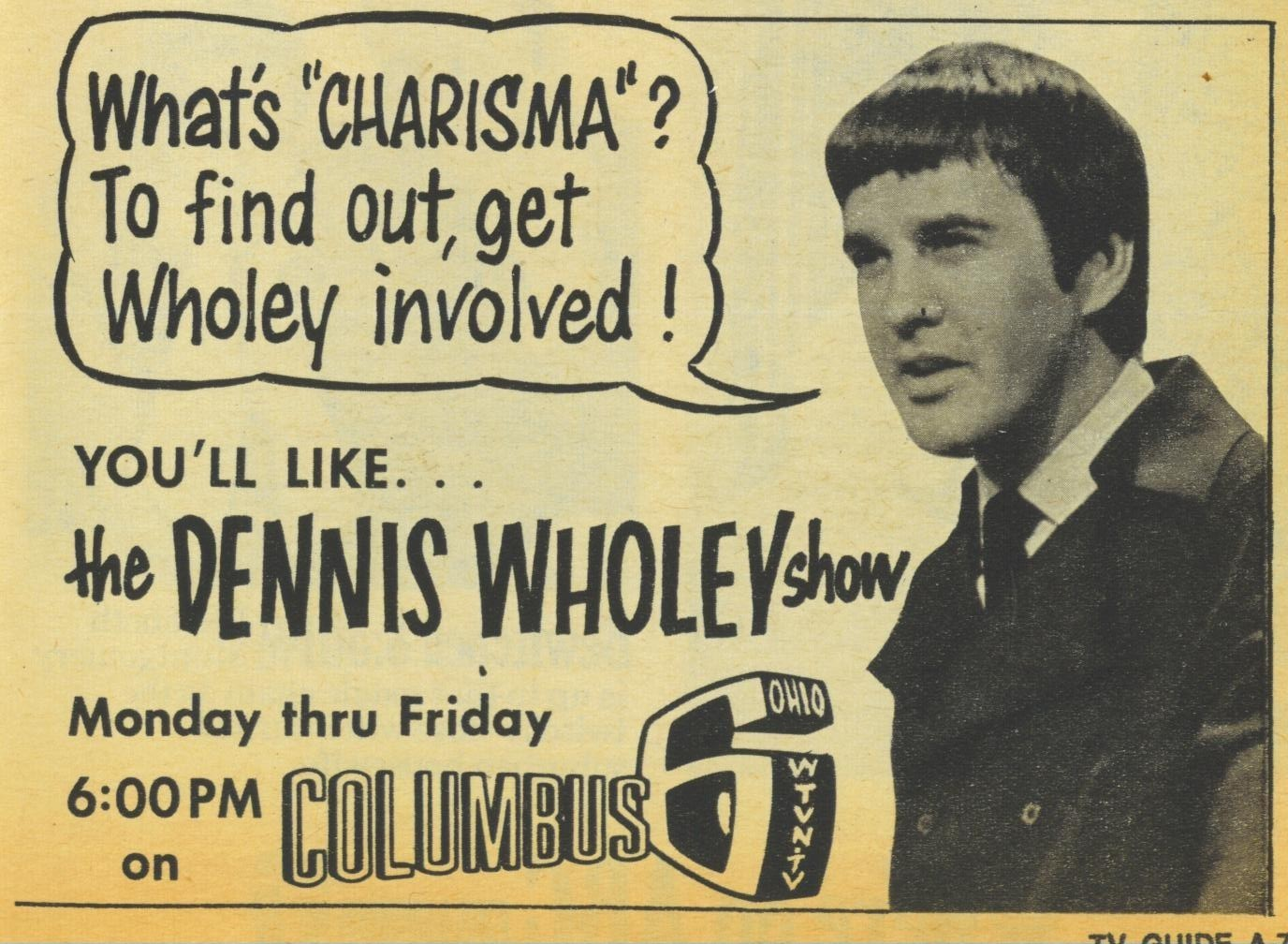
WTVN-TV advertisement for the Dennis Wholey Show

Wholey then became the host of the morning show AM Detroit on WXYZ-TV in Detroit from 1973 to 1977 and a similar show, Morning Break on WDVM-TV in Washington, D.C. in 1977 and 1978. He moved to late night programming with PBS Latenight with Dennis Wholey, an interview show on WTVS-TV in Detroit from 1982 to 1985, which was widely distributed by PBS. He later hosted LateNight America with Dennis Wholey, also for PBS, beginning in 1989. He currently hosts This is America & the World with Dennis Wholey since its start in 1998, which is distributed nationwide by NETA (on PBS and independent public stations) and the AmericanLife TV cable channel.

Radio/TV Mirror magazine named one of Wholey's talk shows an "outstanding program" in the Midwest, and he received the Golden Mike award from the American Federation of Television and Radio Artists (AFTRA) for AM Detroit. In 1984, Wholey began a successful career as an author with his book The Courage to Change: Hope and Help for Alcoholics and Their Families, which sold well and was on the New York Times bestseller list for several months. The book recounted Wholey's own struggles with alcohol and valium addictions, which reached serious proportions during the 1970s before he found help in an alcoholics' support group. The book also included interviews with other recovering alcoholics, including former Congressman Wilbur Mills, rock musician Pete Townshend, Monty Python performer Graham Chapman, and trumpeter Doc Severinsen.

Wholey followed The Courage to Change with a book on the sometimes elusive nature of happiness, Are You Happy? Some Answers to the Most Important Question in Your Life (1986). Featuring interviews with such figures as chef Julia Child, reporter Helen Thomas, actress Ruby Dee and critic Cleveland Amory, the book advised active involvement in life and a careful avoidance of self-pity and resentment. Wholey's third book Becoming Your Own Parent: The Solution for Adult Children of Alcoholic and Other Dysfunctional Families (1988) focused on poorly functioning families and included some material on Wholey's own often difficult childhood.

Wholey continued in the self-help genre with When the Worst That Can Happen Already Has: Conquering Life's Most Difficult Times (1992) and The Miracle of Change: The Path to Self Discovery and Spiritual Growth (1997). His newest book, published in 2007, is Why Do I Keep Doing That? Why Do I Keep Doing That?: Breaking the Negative Patterns in Your Life, which discusses how to escape counterproductive behavior patterns.

Wholey is also the author of a sports fantasy, The Chance of a Lifetime: An Amazing Super Bowl Story.

Wholey is a part time professor at his alma mater Catholic University; teaching courses where he shares his experiences interviewing politicians and the media industry in general.

== Bibliography ==
- The Courage to Change: Hope and Help for Alcoholics and Their Families, Houghton Mifflin Company 1984 ISBN 978-0-395-35977-8
- Are You Happy? Some Answers to the Most Important Question in Your Life, Houghton Mifflin Company 1986 ISBN 978-0-395-40779-0
- Becoming Your Own Parent: The Solution for Adult Children of Alcoholic and Other Dysfunctional Families Doubleday 1988 ISBN 978-0-385-24591-3
- When the Worst That Can Happen Already Has: Conquering Life's Most Difficult Times, Hyperion Books 1992 ISBN 978-1-56282-985-8
- The Miracle of Change: The Path to Self Discovery and Spiritual Growth, Atria 1997 ISBN 978-0-671-51891-2
- Why Do I Keep Doing That? Why Do I Keep Doing That?: Breaking the Negative Patterns in Your Life, HCI 2007 ISBN 978-0-7573-0582-5
- The Chance of a Lifetime: An Amazing Super Bowl Story, Dennis Wholey Enterprises Inc. 2011
