= Mountain Press Publishing Company =

American book publisher

- Founded: 1948
- Founder: David P. Flaccus
- Country of origin: United States
- Headquarters location: Missoula, Montana
- Nonfiction topics: U.S. history, natural history, earth science, geology, and ecology
- Official website: mountain-press.com

Mountain Press Publishing Company is an American book publishing company based in Missoula, Montana. It specializes in western U.S. history, natural history, and non-technical earth science, geology, and ecology.

The company began in 1948 when David P. Flaccus started an offset printing business in Missoula. Over several years the company evolved into an independent publishing company and eventually a distributor for other publishers. The company's largest and most popular series of books is Roadside Geology with 29 titles and sales of over 1 million total copies. Other popular series include Geology Underfoot (7 titles) and Roadside History (18 titles).

In October 2024, The Geological Society of America (GSA) acquired all copyrights and licensing agreements for Mountain Press Publishing Company’s geology series Roadside Geology, Geology Underfoot, and Geology Rocks!, along with select titles from the Earth Science and Young Readers series.
