= Arthur L. Tubbs =

American drama and music critic

Arthur Lewis Tubbs (1867–1946) was an American drama and music critic who worked for the Philadelphia Evening Bulletin for almost 40 years.

He wrote plays and poems, under the name Arthur Sylvester. He also wrote hymns.

== Bibliography ==
- The Finger of Scorn
- The Village Lawyer
- The country doctor
- Cranberry Corners
- Alias Miss Sherlock
- Farm Folks: A Rural Play in Four Acts

== Hymns ==
- For a moment in the morning
- It is just a step to Jesus
