= Illinois Central 382 =

American 4-6-0 locomotive

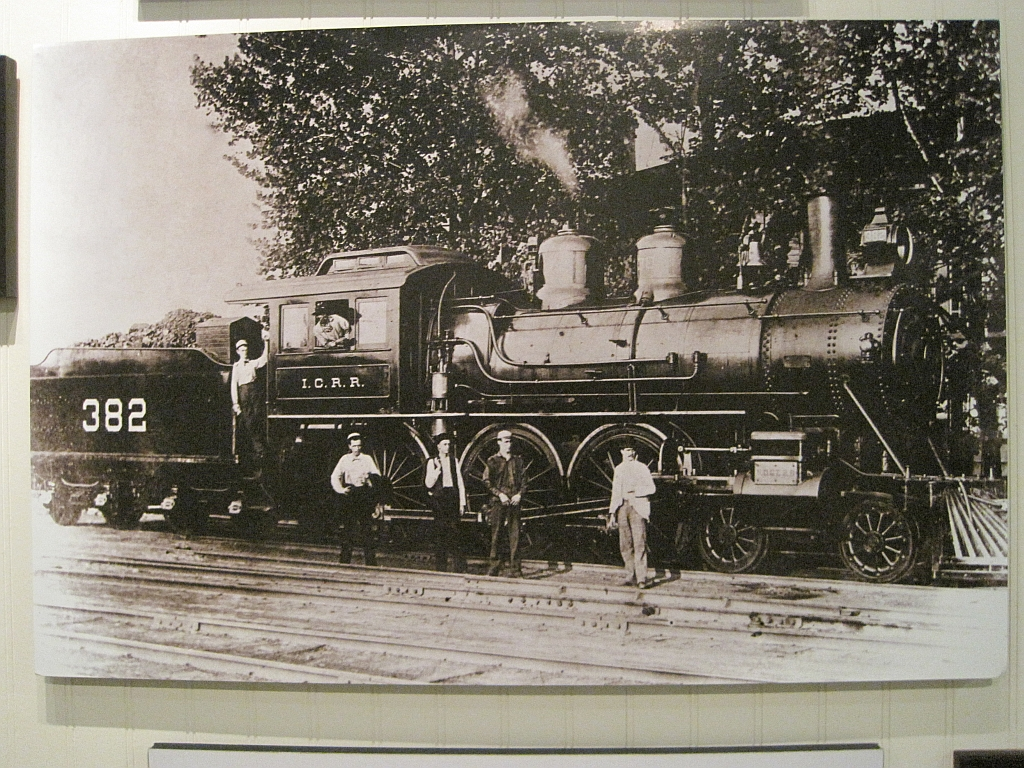
- IC 382 in the yard of Water Valley, Mississippi, rebuilt after its crash in Vaughan, Mississippi, 1900
Type and origin
- Power type: Steam
- Builder: Rogers Locomotive Works
- Serial number: 5292
- Build date: August 1898
Specifications
- Configuration
  - Whyte: 4-6-0
  - UIC: 2′C n2
- Gauge: 4 ft 8 1/2 in (1,435 mm)
- Driver dia.: 69 in (1,753 mm)
- Width: 10 ft (3,048 mm)
- Loco weight: originally: 149,700 pounds (67.9 t); later: 158,300 pounds (71.8 t)
- Fuel type: Coal
- Cylinders: Two, outside
- Cylinder size: 19 1/2 in × 26 in (495 mm × 660 mm)
Performance figures
- Maximum speed: 100 mph (160 km/h)
Career
- Operators: Illinois Central (1898-1930)
- Numbers: IC 382; IC 212; IC 2012; IC 5012
- Nicknames: Ole' 382; The Cannonball
- Retired: July 1935
- Disposition: Scrapped

Illinois Central No. 382, also known as "Ole' 382" or "The Cannonball", was a 4-6-0 "Ten Wheeler" bought new from the Rogers Locomotive Works in Paterson, New Jersey for the Illinois Central Railroad. Constructed in 1898, the locomotive was used for fast passenger service between Chicago, Illinois and New Orleans, Louisiana. On the night of April 30, 1900, engineer Casey Jones and fireman Simeon "Sim" Webb were traveling with the engine from Memphis, Tennessee to Canton, Mississippi. The train collided with the rear of a freight train stuck on the mainline in Vaughan, Mississippi, the last station before Canton, killing Jones and injuring dozens more. After the accident, the locomotive was rebuilt in Water Valley, Mississippi, and returned to service. The locomotive was believed to be cursed after Jones' death, as it would suffer three more accidents in its career before being retired in July 1935 and scrapped.

Today, a stand in for No. 382, former Clinchfield Railroad No. 99, is now on display at the Casey Jones Home & Railroad Museum, in Jackson, Tennessee, painted up as Illinois Central No. 382.

== History ==
No. 382 was bought new from the Rogers Locomotive Works of Patterson, New Jersey. The new 300 series of 4-6-0 locomotives were designed for fast passenger service on the Illinois Central between Chicago, Illinois, and New Orleans, Louisiana.

=== 1900 wreck ===
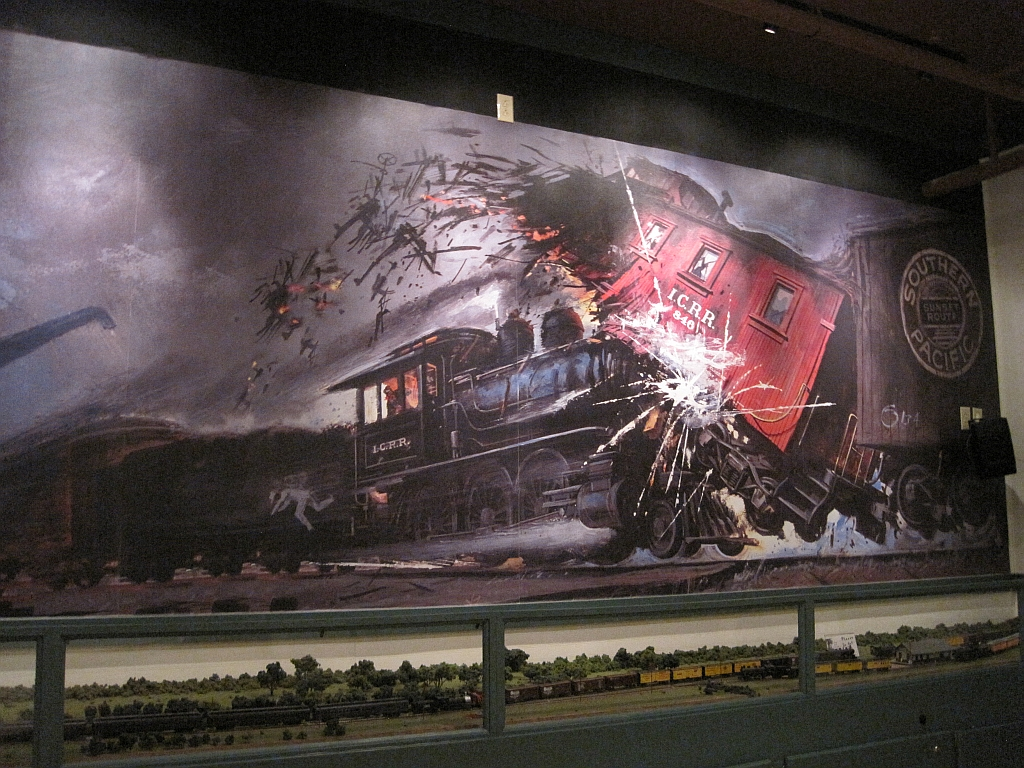
Artist depiction of No. 382's wreck in Vaughan, Mississippi.

There are many accounts of Casey Jones' final journey that led up to his accident in Vaughan, Mississippi. But the agreed upon set of facts state that Jones had taken up a double shift to clear up a sick engineer named Sam Tate on April 29. Jones and his fireman, Simeon Webb, had already traveled from Canton, Mississippi northbound to Memphis, Tennessee for their shift, taking the "New Orleans Special" with a sister locomotive of No. 382, No. 384. When Tate called in sick, Jones and Webb agreed to take Tate's "New Orleans Special" from Memphis, Tennessee to Canton, Mississippi. When they departed with their southbound "New Orleans Special" passenger train, it was an hour and a half behind schedule, with No. 382 being the engine hauling the five car train since its departure in Chicago. At 12:30 am on the night of April 30, the train left Memphis and started their near non-stop journey to Canton, with the only stop being in Goodman, Mississippi, to let another train pass.

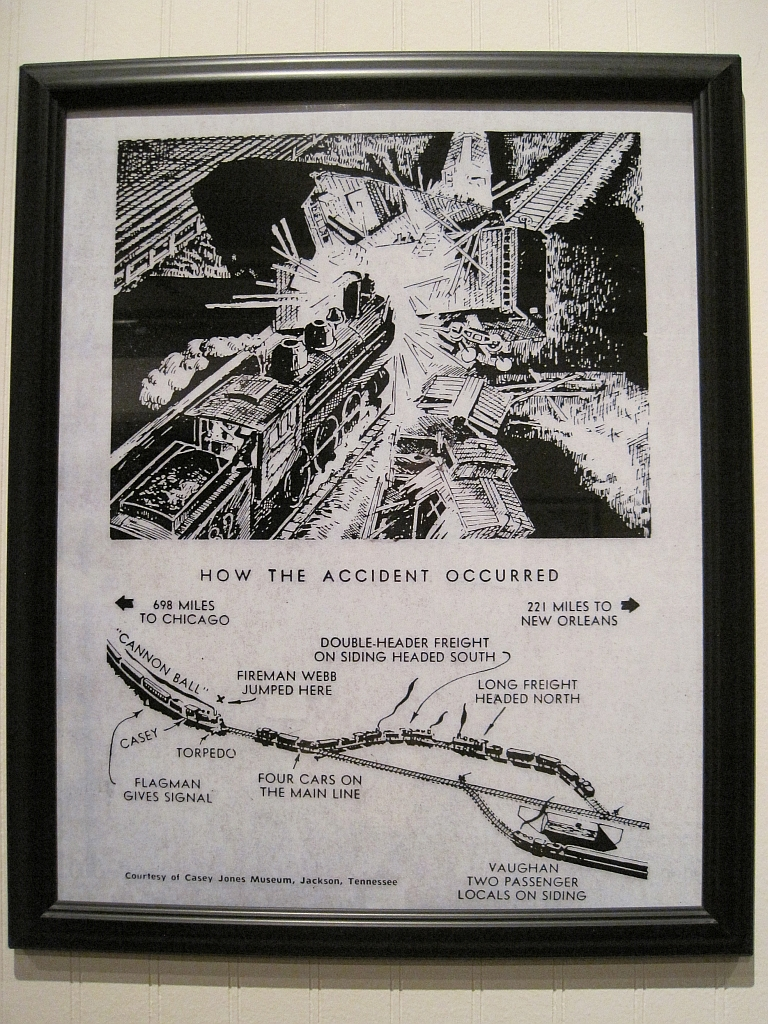
A drawing illustrating how the wreck of No. 382 occurred.

As Jones drove No. 382 down toward Canton, the station and sidings in Vaughan, Mississippi, were filled with three trains all at the same time. The crucial train was a doubleheader going southbound, as its train was too long for the siding. As the "New Orleans Special" rounded an S-Curve, fireman Simeon Webb spotted the doubleheader stuck on the tracks. After yelling at Jones about the train, he applied the emergency brakes and threw No. 382 into reverse at the same time. Jones told Webb to jump out, and so Webb did, getting knocked unconscious as he hit the ground. Jones' train crashed at 3:52 am and smashed through a caboose, two separate boxcars, one full of hay and the other for corn, and halfway through a flatcar of lumber. Jones was the only fatality from that accident.

=== Post 1900 ===
After the Vaughan wreck, No. 382 was moved to Water Valley, Mississippi, for repairs, returning to service that summer. However, the engine had a string of other accidents throughout the rest of her career, totaling six deaths, including Casey Jones

In 1903, criminals sabotaged the tracks and caused 382 to flip on its side. Engineer Harry A. Norton lost both of his legs and received third degree burns. His fireman, however, died in that accident three days later, after being scalded to death.

In 1905, the engine ran over a set of points, derailed, and flipped down an embankment in the Memphis South Yards in Tennessee. Norton was the driver for No. 382 that day as well, but he survived that accident as well.

The locomotive was renumbered 212 in July 1900, then 2012 in July/August 1907, then 5012 in 1922.

On January 22, 1912, No. 2012 crashed into the rear of a passenger train in Kinmundy, Illinois, resulting in four deaths, including the former president of the Illinois Central. This also ended up being the engine's deadliest accident.

In July 1935, No. 2012 was removed from service and scrapped.

Illinois Central 382
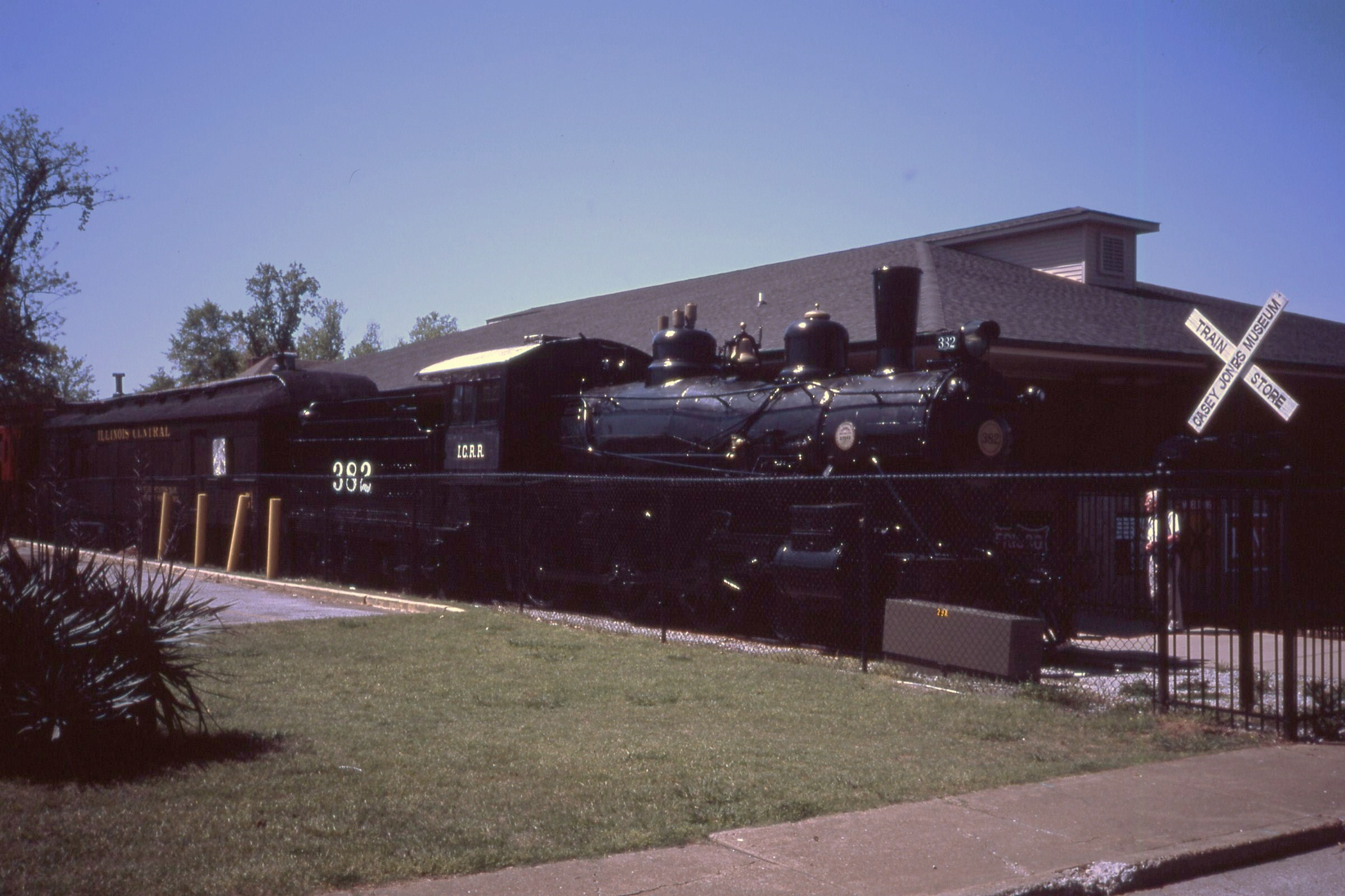
- Clinchfield No. 99 at the Casey Jones Home & Railroad Museum in 2013
Type and origin
- Power type: Steam
- Builder: Baldwin Locomotive Works
- Serial number: 27048
- Build date: December 1905
Specifications
- Configuration
  - Whyte: 4-6-0
  - UIC: 2′C n2
- Gauge: 4 ft 8 1/2 in (1,435 mm)
- Driver dia.: 63 in (1,600 mm)
- Loco weight: 137,700 lb (62.5 t)
- Tender weight: 99,300 lb (45.0 t)
- Total weight: 237,000 lb (108 t)
- Fuel type: Coal
- Boiler pressure: 200 psi (1.4×10^{9} mPa)
- Cylinders: Two, outside
- Cylinder size: 19 in × 26 in (483 mm × 660 mm)
- Valve gear: Walschaerts
Performance figures
- Maximum speed: 100 mph (160 km/h)
- Tractive effort: 25,327 lbf (112.66 kN)
- Factor of adh.: 3.87
Career
- Operators: South & Western Railway Company; Carolina, Clinchfield and Ohio Railway; Clinchfield Railroad Company; Black Mountain Railway Company; Yancey Railroad Company
- Class: G-1
- Numbers: SWRC 1; CRR 99; BMRC 3; IC 382
- Retired: February 1956
- Disposition: On static display

== Clinchfield No. 99 ==
Carolina, Clinchfield, & Ohio Railroad, or Clinchfield for short, No. 99 is a 4-6-0 built by the Baldwin Locomotive Works in 1905 as South & Western Railway Company No. 1. In 1908, the South & Western became the Carolina, Clinchfield & Ohio Railway. In 1924, the road was incorporated with the Carolina, Clinchfield & Ohio of South Carolina and the Clinchfield & Northern Railway of Kentucky into the new Clinchfield Railroad, and the engine was renumbered to No. 99. In 1953, No. 99 was sold to the Black Mountain Railway in Burnsville, North Carolina, where it was renumbered to No. 3. The company was bought by the Yancey Railroad in 1955.

The following year, the engine was retired on the Yancey Railroad in 1956 and was sold to the City of Jackson, Tennessee. They purchased No. 99 for the purpose of putting it on display on a new museum dedicated to Casey Jones' life near his and Jeanie Brady's home. The engine was cosmetically restored as Illinois Central No. 382 and was put on display at the Casey Jones Home & Railroad Museum, later opening that same year.

In 1980, the Casey Jones Village was established, and Jones' home and No. 382 were moved to the new plaza, with the museum reopening a year later in 1981.

No. 99, repainted as IC No. 382, is now on static display at the Casey Jones Home & Railroad Museum in Jackson, Tennessee.

== Legacy ==
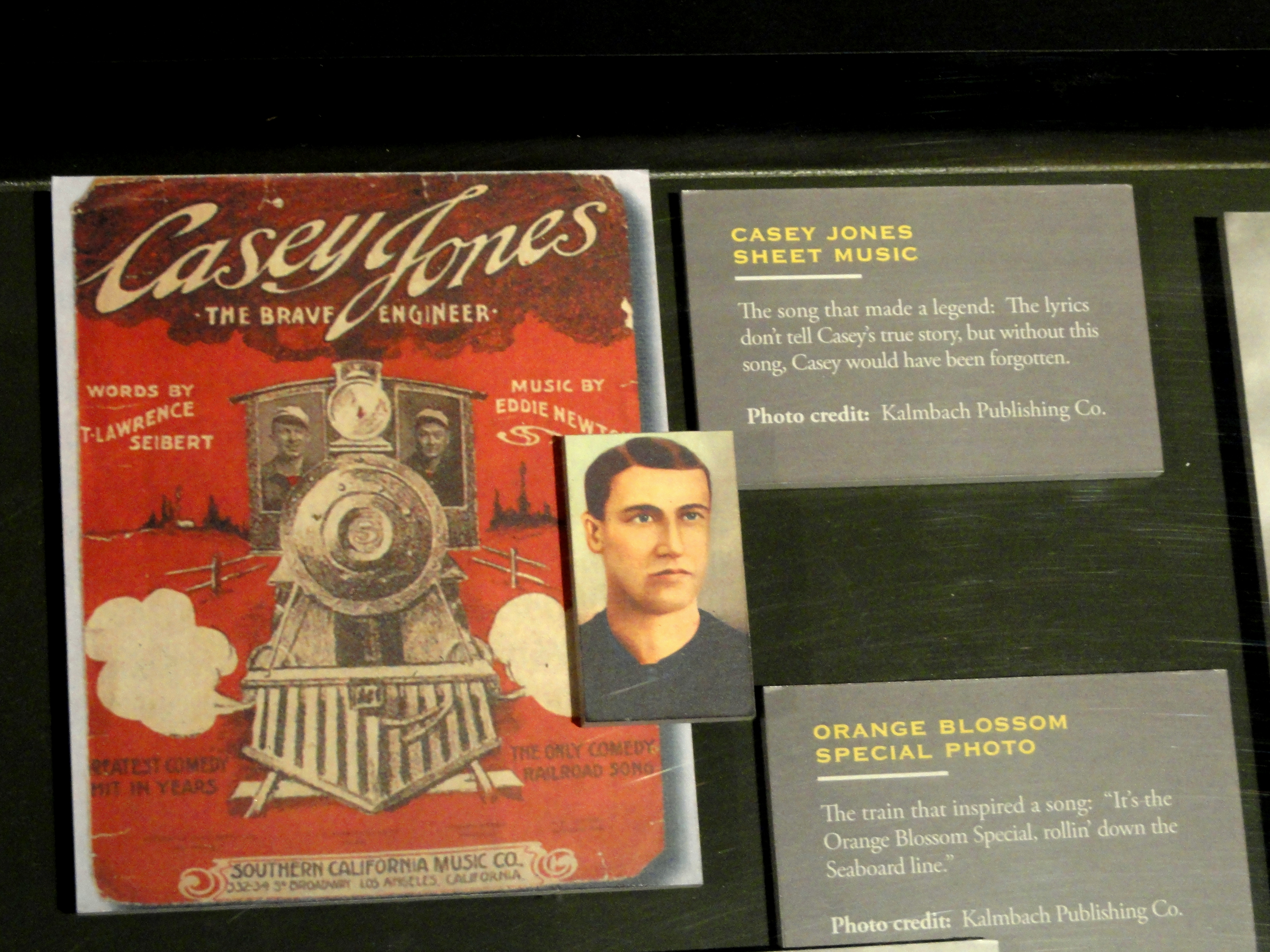
A vinyl record of Casey Jones featuring 382.

No. 382 has been featured and mentioned in several songs in addition with Casey Jones. No. 382 even served as the basis for the mock-up locomotives, No. 29 & Constitution in the 2013 live action Disney film The Lone Ranger.

== See also ==
- Illinois Central Railroad
- Illinois Railway Museum
- The Ballad of Casey Jones
