= The Brave Engineer =

1950 film by Jack Kinney

- Directed by: Jack Kinney
- Story by: Dick Kinney; Dick Shaw
- Based on: The Ballad of Casey Jones by Eddie Newton; T. Lawrence Seibert
- Produced by: Walt Disney
- Starring: The King's Men
- Narrated by: Jerry Colonna
- Music by: Ken Darby
- Animation by: Milt Kahl; Fred Moore; Al Bertino
- Layouts by: Don DaGradi
- Backgrounds by: Ray Huffine
- Production company: Walt Disney Productions
- Distributed by: RKO Radio Pictures
- Release date: March 3, 1950
- Running time: 7:38
- Country: United States

The Brave Engineer is a 1950 Walt Disney-produced animated short film, based on the exploits of legendary railroad engineer John Luther "Casey" Jones. It is narrated by comic Jerry Colonna and is a comedically madcap fanciful re-telling of the story related in the Wallace Saunders ballad, later made famous by Eddie Newton and T. Lawrence Seibert.

== Plot ==
The cartoon opens to a railroad yard where "all the trains are fast asleep". The sun rises, and engineer Casey Jones wakes from his slumber in the cab of his engine, an American Standard 4-4-0 tender engine No. 2, that is hauling a small, yet valuable train known as the Western Mail. His train begins the journey and Casey is intent on making his schedule at all costs.

Casey is confronted by a variety of obstacles along the way. He has to paddle his train through flooded wetlands, stop for a cow crossing the tracks, and save a woman who was tied up on the tracks by a stereotypical villain character. Another villain destroys a span of tracks on a trestle, and as Casey has to get the Western Mail across a gorge without those tracks, his train heads on into a dry desert canyon. He fights off a group of criminals, who climb onto the cab of his engine in an attempt to rob the train.

To make up for lost time, Casey runs his engine well past his mechanical limits, plowing through two tunnels (one which exploded since the last one didn't), passing a five-mile sign causing it and the tracks to melt. While focusing completely on repairing the engine, he drives the Western Mail at full speed down a hill on a collision course with another train, which is a double-headed slow freight train, that is hauled by two other engines, No. 77 and No. 5. The conductor sees the other train, but gasps, and runs up, and attempts to warn Casey about the oncoming train, but Casey is too busy fixing the engine to pay attention and can't hear him, and so the conductor jumps for his life as do the crew of their other train. As Casey only notices at the last second, the two trains collide with a large explosion in a cloud of black smoke. The station porter's initial disappointment of thinking the train won't arrive is quickly dispelled as Casey arrives, aboard what remains of his rapidly collapsing engine. Casey is triumphant at making it to his destination, though his pocket watch literally says, 'On Time. Almost.'

== Home media ==
The short was released on December 6, 2005, on Walt Disney Treasures: Disney Rarities - Celebrated Shorts: 1920s–1960s.

Additional releases include:

- 2002: Disney's American Legends

== See also ==
- Make Mine Music - the 1946 package feature that featured "Casey at the Bat" which similar design and madcap comedic pace
- John Luther "Casey" Jones
- Casey Jones - a loose adaptation of the legend with Alan Hale as Casey
