= Help Me... I'm Possessed =

- Directed by: Charles Nizet
- Screenplay by: Bill Greer; Deedy Peters
- Produced by: Charles Nizet
- Starring: Bill Greer; Deedy Peters; Lynne Marta
- Production companies: Peerless Film Productions; Riviera Productions
- Release date: 1974
- Running time: 80 minutes
- Country: United States
- Language: English

Help Me... I'm Possessed is a 1974 American psychological horror film directed by Charles Nizet, written by Bill Greer and Deedy Peters, and starring Greer, Peters, Lynne Marta, and Dorothy Green.

== Cast ==
- Bill Greer as Dr. Arthur Blackwood
- Deedy Peters as Mrs. Diane Blackwood
- Lynne Marta as Melanie Blackwood
- Jim Dean as Taylor - The Sheriff
- Tony Reese as Ernest - The Chauffeur
- Blackie Hunt as Eleanor - Nurse
- Dorothy Green as Edith - The Castle Dweller
- Barbara Thorsen as Dr. Blackwood's Sexy Redhead Patient
- Pepper Davis as Deputy Sheriff
- Pierre Agostino as Hunchback

== Production ==
The film was shot in 1971 under the working title Nightmare at Blood Castle.

== Release ==
In November 2021, the American Genre Film Archive (AGFA) released the film on Blu-ray in a triple-feature set along with Carnival of Blood (1970) and Night of the Strangler (1972).
