= Casey Jones (TV series) =

American Western television series (1957–1958)

- Opening Credits Logo
- Genre: Western
- Written by: Bill Barrett; John K. Butler; Lee Erwin; Stephen Longstreet; Frank L. Moss
- Directed by: Abby Berlin; George Blair; Lew Landers
- Starring: Alan Hale; Bobby Clark; Dub Taylor; Eddy Waller; Mary Lawrence
- Opening theme: "The Ballad of Casey Jones"
- Country of origin: United States
- Original language: English
- No. of seasons: 1
- No. of episodes: 32

Production
- Producers: Samuel Bischoff; Kenneth Gamet; Harold Greene
- Cinematography: Ray Cory; Irving Lippman
- Editors: Jack Ogilvie; Joseph Silver; Thomas Pratt
- Running time: 30 minutes
- Production companies: Briskin Productions; Screen Gems

Original release
- Network: Syndication
- Release: October 8, 1957 – May 5, 1958

Casey Jones is an American Western television series syndicated during the 1957–58 television season. It was based upon the life of late 19th-century engineer Casey Jones in the era of pioneering western railroads. Casey Jones also aired on both the BBC and ITV in the United Kingdom and on the Seven Network in Australia.

== Synopsis ==
The series is set in the late 19th century, featuring the adventures of railroad engineer Casey Jones and the crew of the Cannonball Express steam locomotive, fireman Wallie Sims and conductor Redrock Smith, working for the Midwest and Central Railroad. Casey lived in the fictional Missouri town of Midvale, within commuting distance of St. Louis, with his wife, Alice, their young son, Casey, Jr., and their dog Cinders. Although there really was a famous locomotive engineer named Casey Jones of the Illinois Central Railroad, the television series is only loosely based on him. His train is named "Cannonball Express" (the real Jones' locomotive, #382, was nicknamed "Cannonball"). The name of the character Wallie Sims is a conflation of Illinois Central employee Wallace Saunders, who wrote the earliest version of "The Ballad of Casey Jones," and the real Jones' fireman, Simeon "Sim" Webb. Unlike Wallie Sims, both Saunders and Webb were black.

Kenneth Gamet, the producer of Casey Jones, offers a gentler Western series against the more violent adult shows of the time. Casey Jones features the same classical types of plots as other westerns such as train robbers and vandals, but the episodes center as much on Casey's interaction with his family, particularly Casey, Jr.

== Cast list ==
=== Regulars ===
- Alan Hale as Casey Jones
- Bobby Clark as Casey, Jr.
- Dub Taylor as Wallie Sims
- Eddy Waller as Red Rock
- Mary Lawrence as Alice Jones

=== Semi-regulars ===
- Jim Bannon as Sheriff Tynes (7 episodes)
- Paul Keast as Mr. Carter the railroad president (10 episodes)

== Production notes ==
Commissioned by Los Angeles television station KTTV, it was shot on a special set at Ray "Crash" Corrigan's studio Corriganville in the Simi Valley, California.

Shot for one season, in part because of Alan Hale's commitment to filming episodes of Rory Calhoun's The Texan, the series ran for 32 half-hour black-and-white episodes. Its theme song was a version of the "Ballad of Casey Jones".

The regular version of the opening titles features Alan Hale with Bobby Clark in the cab and credits Mary Lawrence, but the inclusion of Cinders is inconsistent. A reversed image is used in a close up of the Cannonball and the nameplate can be seen as reversed behind the show title.

There are alternate versions of the closing credits. Both feature Alan Hale and Bobby Clark waving from the cab, the second features different shots of the Cannonball, including one of it passing over a trestle and the brow of a hill, and a different version of the song with slight amendments to the lyrics (to include Cinders). Alan Hale filmed an introduction to the first episode on set with Bobby Clark where he introduced the new series to the audience.

The locomotive used in location footage was Sierra No. 3, which was also used in many other television shows and films. The railroad scenes were filmed on the Sierra Railroad in Tuolumne County, California.

== Episode list ==
(Episode titles do not appear in the on-screen credits and are derived from contemporary sources)

No. in season	Title	Directed by	Written by	Original release date
1	"Night Mail"	Sidney Salkow	Stephen Longstreet	May 18, 1958
Casey Jones and the Cannonball Express must race a train from the Southern and Panhandle Railroad to win the contract to carry the mail from St Louis to Fort Worth. When their attempt to bribe Casey fails, the crew of the 'Swamp Tiger' resort to sabotage in order to win the race.: Cast: Pat Hogan, Mort Mills This episode predicted the United States Postal Service by exact name in dialogue 13 years before the USPS was created. At the time, U.S. mail was handled by the Cabinet-level Post Office Department.
2	"The President's Special"	Abby Berlin	Frank L Moss	May 25, 1958
A Secret Service agent travels on the Cannonball to meet President Chester Arthur, but unknown to Casey the man on board is an impostor intent on assassination.: Cast: Robert J. Stevenson, Preston Hanson, Paul Sorensen
3	"Prison Train"	Abby Berlin	Bill Barrett	June 1, 1958
Casey must transport gold bullion along with several soldiers who are prisoners aboard the Cannonball. The train is ambushed by a gang intent on stealing the gold and leaving no witnesses...: Cast: James Gavin, Bing Russell, Stewart Bradley, Chuck Courtney
4	"Way Station"	George Blair	Berne Giler	June 8, 1958
Train robbers Kenny, Jackie and their leader Willis hijack the Cannonball, intent on stealing the registered mail. They hold Casey, Wallie and the passengers at a way station until the mail train arrives...: Cast: Jan Merlin as Kenny, Richard Bakalyan as Jackie, Ken Becker as Willis, Walter Baldwin as Conductor, Grant Richards as Tay Putnam, Ann Baker as Jeannie uncredited: George Cisar as traveling salesman who is fatally shot by train robbers Eddy Waller and Mary Lawrence do not appear.
5	"Spurline to Danger"	Lew Landers	Tony Barrett	June 15, 1958
While delivering supplies to Fort Lawrence, Casey and his family are caught up in an attack by Sioux Indians provoked by Colonel Bullock's bad treatment of Indian prisoners. Casey must get back to the Cannonball to gather more ammunition.: Cast: William Leslie, Robert Cornthwaite, Willis Bouchey, Joseph Vitale
6	"Satan's Wail"	George Blair	Earl Baldwin	June 22, 1958
While Casey makes a new whistle for the Cannonball, Casey Junior decides he wants to be a telegrapher instead of an engineer. Casey must transport the contents of a bank including $1 million in gold bullion on board the Cannonball, but the soldiers sent to accompany the shipment are in fact a gang of thieves intent on robbing the train.: Cast: Alexander Campbell, Chris Alcaide, Lynn Shubert, Tyler McVey, Stanley Farrar
7	"The Old Timer"	George Blair	Kenneth A Enochs, Christopher Knopf	June 29, 1958
Redrock is forced to take compulsory retirement, but danger lies ahead for Casey when an overnight storm damages the trestle further down the line.: Cast: Kenneth MacDonald, Joe Conley
8	"Run to Deadwood"	George Blair	John K Butler	July 6, 1958
Casey must transport a special prisoner aboard the Cannonball, and finds an unexpected use for his lunch pail.: Cast: Joe De Santis, Lee Roberts, Patrick Sexton, Don Carlos, Robert Hedrick
9	"Death Rides the Tender"	Lew Landers	Ellis Marcus	July 13, 1958
When a miner is found shot on the line, Casey must turn detective and help the sheriff track down the murderer. When he does, the accused man's father, who happens to be a co-worker of Casey and his crew, sets out to prove how much he cares for his son.: Cast: Ray Teal, Sheridan Comerate, Tom McKee
10	"One Way Ticket"	George Blair	Lawrence Resner	July 27, 1958
Charlie Ferguson is released from prison after the manslaughter of Luther Wagner's daughter, but a mob from Midvale is awaiting his return. This episode focuses on reconciliation in the face of revenge.: Cast: Howard Negley, Jimmy Lydon, Ken Mayer, Judy Sochor
11	"The Lost Train"	George Blair	J. Robert Bren & Gladys Atwater	August 3, 1958
The Cannonball Express is stolen by a gang intent on using it to escape with their haul of stolen gold.: Cast: Malcolm Atterbury, Myron Healey, James Anderson, Norman Leavitt
12	"The Gunslinger"	Lew Landers	Lee Erwin	August 10, 1958
When a young girl falls ill with appendicitis on the Cannonball, her only hope is the sheriff's prisoner Doc Bailey, a man convicted of murder on his way to execution.: Cast: William Bryant, Harry Shannon, Dorothy Morris, Cheryl Callaway
13	"Storm Warning"	George Blair	John K Butler	August 17, 1958
Two fugitives break into Casey's home and hold him and his family hostage, but when one falls ill from his wounds, Casey must appeal to the other to stand by his friend rather than abandon him.: Cast: Denver Pyle, Robert Jordan, Virginia Christine, Hal Taggart
14	"Iron Men"	George Blair	Frank Moss	August 24, 1958
Casey comes to the aid of immigrant railroad workers who come under threat from cattlemen reluctant to share the land.: Cast: Eric Feldary, Tiger Fafara, Stafford Repp, Daniel White
15	"Girl in the Cab"	George Blair	Kay Lenard, Jess Carneol	August 31, 1958
A woman hiding in the cab is intent on robbing a strong box bound for the bank at Midvale.: Cast: Russ Conway, Helen Westcott, Havis Davenport, Peter Brocco
16	"A Badge for Casey"	Abby Berlin	Mona Fisher	September 7, 1958
Mort Clio and his men take over the town of Bitter Creek, lying in wait to kill Judge Ripley in revenge for sentencing Clio's brother to hang. When they kill the sheriff, Casey is challenged to accept the sheriff's badge and stop them.: Cast: Lee Van Cleef, Michael Carr, Dick Rich, X Brands
17	"Night Run"	George Blair	Oscar Brodney	September 14, 1958
When a terrible storm causes the dam to burst, Casey must rescue the people of Valley Junction and make it to high ground in the Cannonball before the flood waters hit the town.: Cast: S. John Launer, Will Wright, Harry Harvey Jr., John Mitchum
18	"The Marauders"	George Blair	Bill Barrett	September 21, 1958
With Morgan's Marauders intending to plunder Dover City, Casey is ordered to wreck a train carrying the marshal and his men to make the marauders think they were killed, but when the marauders invade Midvale, Casey must find a way to stop them.: Cast: Harry Lauter as Garson, Robert Knapp as Morgan, Jim Bannon as Sheriff Tynes, Paul Keast as Mr. Carter, Ben Erway as Struthers uncredited: Norman Leavitt as Vic Presby, Midvale station telegrapher
19	"Black Box"	George Blair	Wells Root, Paul Savage	September 28, 1958
Casey is asked to carry a special shipment on behalf of the Mexican government aboard the Cannonball, the crown jewels of the executed Emperor Maximilian, which are hidden in a coffin. But the Secret Service man accompanying the casket has been replaced by an impostor, who is planning to uncouple the cars and steal the jewels when they derail on a steep curve.: Cast: Herbert Rudley, Adele Mara, Donald Lawton, John Eldredge
20	"The Trackwalker"	Abby Berlin	Thomas Seller	October 5, 1958
When a drifter (Russell Johnson) saves the Cannonball, Casey gets him a job in the yard, but the newcomer is being shadowed by a blackmailer.: Cast: George Berkeley, Russell Johnson, Ted de Corsia
21	"Star Witness"	George Blair	John K. Butler (teleplay); Donald H. Clark (story)	October 12, 1958
Casey must take Marshall Purvis and Nell Dixon to Denver. Miss Dixon is a witness for the Railroad Commission and knows who was responsible for a recent railroad crash, but as the Cannonball enters a tunnel, shots are fired and Marshall Purvis is injured...: Cast: Steve Pendleton as Marshall Purvis, Eve McVeagh as Nell Dixon, Paul McGuire as Todhunter, Hal Baylor as Riley, Stanley Adams as Fowler, Eddie Ryder as Dr. Hines uncredited: Paul Keast as Mr. Carter the railroad president Mary Lawrence does not appear.
22	"The Dutch Clock"	George Blair	Bill Barrett (teleplay); Polly James and Tom Kilpatrick (story)	October 19, 1958
When lawyer Ben Slater threatens to sue the railroad for damage to his farmer client Jake Kane's burned crop, apparently by sparks from the speeding Cannonball, a Dutch clock (tachograph) is installed in the engine. Although suspended by Mr. Carter, Casey decides to take the Cannonball out for an unscheduled run to get to the bottom of the claim.: Cast: William Bakewell as Ben Slater, Tom Monroe as Jake Kane, Wally Vernon as Giles, Dudley Pickett as Timmy Slater uncredited: Jim Bannon as Sheriff Tynes, Paul Keast as Mr. Carter the railroad president, Edmund Cobb as Mayo Tilton
23	"The Dark Rider"	George Blair	Merwin Gerard (teleplay); Robert Eisenbach (story)	October 26, 1958
When a sailor aboard the Cannonball is found to be infected with smallpox, Casey must get him to a hospital but has to contend with important businessman George Newsome and his wife Amanda trying to leave the quarantined train and vigilantes forbidding the train to stop along the route.: Cast: Howard Petrie as George Newsome, Frances Robinson as Amanda Newsome, Peter Adams as Dr. John Morton, Cain Mason as Tom Dolan, Clarence Straight as Keefer Mary Lawrence does not appear.
24	"Dangerous Hours"	George Blair	Crane Wilbur	November 2, 1958
A gang robs the bank at Midvale and hijacks the Cannonball Express. When they learn that Alice Jones is on board, Casey is forced to go along with their demands.: Cast: Anthony Caruso, Gregg Barton, Don Garrett, Matt Winston
25	"The Treasure of Sam Bass"	George Blair	John K Butler, George & Gertrude Fass	November 9, 1958
Following a shootout aboard the Cannonball, Casey Junior finds a map hidden amongst the peanuts he has been selling to the passengers, a map Gene Deming will do anything to find...: Cast: Stacy Harris, Dorothy Green, Henry Wills
26	"Hard Luck Train"	George Blair	Bill Barrett	November 16, 1958
During Casey's absence, the Cannonball is robbed twice, each time driven by his old friend Earl Bonner. Casey must stay loyal to his friend and help prove his innocence.: Cast: Bill Henry, Francis De Sales, G. Pat Collins, Walter Reed
27	"The Silk Train"	George Blair	John K Butler	November 23, 1958
When a train carrying a cargo of raw silk from the Orient passes through, a gang plans to use the Cannonball to stage a crash and destroy the shipment.: Cast: Don C. Harvey, Jack Lomas, Ed Kenney, Richard Powers, Emerson Treacy
28	"Lethal Journey"	George Blair	Arthur Orloff	November 30, 1958
When ten men are trapped following a mining accident, Casey volunteers to carry a cargo of nitroglycerine aboard the Cannonball in a race against time – but a man has gotten aboard the train, determined to get to Galesburg to prevent a hanging.: Cast: Fred Graham, Douglas Odney, Charles Quigley, Frederick Ford, Robert Bice
29	"Honeymoon Express"	George Blair	Bill Barrett	December 7, 1958
The Cannonball is chartered by Arlo Bradford to pick up his wife and wedding party, but Casey gets suspicious when Bradford insists on stopping to pick up a couple of men along the way. When they stop at Kiola, Bradford has things on his mind other than lunch...: Cast: Willard Waterman, Floyd Christy, Reed Howes, Bob Hopkins
30	"The Fire Eater"	George Blair	Bill Barrett	December 14, 1958
Casey's friend Ben Mallory loses his job with the Pontus Variety Players. The next day, with Mallory and Greg Pontus aboard, the Cannonball develops a problem and runs out of water in Apache country. When Pontus and Redrock are captured, Mallory must face up to his fear if he is to save the men.: Cast: Angela Stevens as Caroline Sawyer, Louis Jean Heydt as Ben Mallory, Frank Lackteen as Chief and Robert Lowery as Greg Pontus Mary Lawrence does not appear.
31	"Mrs. Casey Jones"	Lew Landers	Mary McCall, Jr. (teleplay); Lee Erwin (story)	December 21, 1958
Tired of the risks Casey takes as an engineer, Alice persuades him to take the job of district manager with the railroad. But when local resident Barlow delivers the news that fifty people are stranded on Crown Hill by a forest fire, Griswold, the Cannonball's new driver refuses to take the risk, leaving Casey with a dilemma.: Cast: Paul Keast as Nathaniel Carter, Tom Fadden as Griswold, William Challee as Barlow
32	"Layover at Jamestown"	George Blair	Kevin David	December 28, 1958
Sam Wilson, the dispatcher at Jamestown, is being held for murder. Marshal Croy, who intends to take him for trial in Laramie, has a reputation of taking his prisoners in dead... and Casey learns that the man Sam shot was Croy's elder brother.: Cast: James Bell as Sam Wilson, Leo Gordon as Croy, Roy Barcroft as Sheriff Barton, John Dierkes as Grimes Mary Lawrence does not appear.

== Broadcast ==
In the UK, the series was first shown by ITV regional stations TWW, ATV Midlands and STV in 1958-1959 (various dates). ITV's London contractor, Associated Rediffusion, aired it from 8 November 1961 to 21 February 1962 (16 episodes), and from 4 April 1962 to 30 May 1962 (a further 9 episodes). According to issues of the UK Radio Times magazine, the series was shown in the UK on BBC1, the first run commencing on 8 November 1967, with a second run from 21 March 1969. Both runs showed only 26 episodes of the series. The last screening of an episode by the BBC was in August 1975. As of April 2021, the show is airing on the Sony-owned getTV network. In the mid-1990s, it also aired on FX Australia.
