= Illinois Central shopmen's strike of 1911 =

Deadly, failed labor action

The Illinois Central shopmen's strike of 1911 was a labor action in the United States of a number of railroad workers unions against the Illinois Central Railroad, beginning on September 30, 1911. The strike was marked by its violence in numerous locations. At least 12 men were killed in shootings across the country, and in March 1912, some 30 men were killed when a locomotive boiler exploded in San Antonio, Texas.

The strike was judged a failure within months, long before its formal ending on June 28, 1915. The railroads hired strikebreakers, often from African-American and immigrant minorities, which added to the social and economic tensions associated with the strikes.

== Causes ==
The Illinois Central and the eight affiliated Harriman lines had recognized and successfully negotiated with individual shopcraft unions for some time. But in June 1911, these unions sought additional leverage by negotiating together as the "System Federation".

The railroad simply refused and replaced the strikers. The first day of the strike was relatively peaceful, with a reported 30,000 strikers walking out at 10:00 a.m. in at least 24 cities. Most were in the South and Midwest in the main areas served by the railroad, but men struck as far west as Seattle, Washington, and San Francisco and Los Angeles, California.

== Conflict ==
Because of its geography, the state of Mississippi was dependent on Illinois Central lines. Violence flared there first, on October 3. When a train carrying strikebreakers pulled in to McComb, Mississippi, a railroad center, it was met by an armed and waiting crowd of 100 strikers. The crowd and passengers exchanged gunfire and thrown bricks, then the badly shot-up train fled. Reports of high casualties were not accurate. A striker named Hugh Montgomery was reported as killed by a brick, but he was documented as later testifying for an investigating committee, and nobody on the train was killed.

But as many persons were wounded by the hundreds of shots exchanged in the space of 20 minutes, the incident was serious enough for Governor Edmond Noel to call out the state guard. Also on October 3, a striking switchman named Robert Mitchell was killed by a strikebreaker in Cairo, Illinois. In Denison, Texas an angry mob chased 35 strikebreakers out of town.

The same day, a "special guard" named J.J. Pipes was killed at the Southern Pacific yards in Houston, perhaps from the friendly fire of other strikebreakers, and other men were wounded. At one o'clock the following morning on the shop grounds in Houston, a strikebreaker named Frank Tullis was shot and killed, most likely by a striker or sympathizer. Also on October 4, in McComb a striker named Lem Haley was fatally shot by other strikers, even as the governor ordered four more companies of state militia to counter "hundreds of heavily armed men" reported to be pouring into the town.

On October 5, strikebreakers arriving in New Orleans were met with two separate riots, with women "prominent in several of the mobs".

On October 6, violence similar to that in McComb broke out in Water Valley, Mississippi, causing Governor Noel to send the state guard there as well. From October 2 through at least November 29, a steady pattern of strike-related shootings and assaults plagued downstate Illinois, centered in Carbondale, Centralia, Mounds, and East St. Louis. Striker J.S. Coldereau was fatally shot in a saloon fight by a strikebreaker in Bakersfield, California on November 25, 1911. On December 5, in Salt Lake City, John G. Hayden, a striking carman of the Oregon Short Line, was shot by two Italian strikebreakers, Frank Malazia and R. Pucci. Hayden died days later of his injuries. Malazia was indicted for murder but ultimately acquitted. On December 16 there was a third related fatality in Houston, when a non-striking shop worker named Thomas Lyons was reportedly shot while feeding his cats.

== Into 1912 ==
Despite the numbers of strikers and the level of conflict, the unions were in a poor bargaining position. By the end of the year, the railroads had been able to replace the strikers and were operating normally.

The strikers' position had been undermined by an economic slowdown in rail traffic, which increased the available labor pool. In addition, the union engineers, firemen, and brakemen cooperated with the company and strikebreakers, keeping the railroads functioning. These were dubbed "union scabs", a phrase that inspired the Joe Hill song Casey Jones—the Union Scab, written for this strike.

Resistance continued. Back in McComb, Mississippi, on January 17, 1912, five black strikebreakers were shot while walking down a road. Three were killed. On January 25, a striking car inspector named Ed Lefevre was shot to death in Mojave, California; several guards were arrested but no one charged. There were at least seven incidents of attempted sabotage with dynamite, and elevated numbers of accidents along the lines. The boiler of locomotive #704 exploded in San Antonio, Texas, killing 30 men on March 18, 1912. Sabotage was suspected but never proved in that incident.

Lastly, on December 30, 1913, Carl E. Person, an official of the union System Federation, was lured to an inter-urban station in Clinton, Illinois and assaulted by a strikebreaker named Tony Musser. Person shot him to death. Defended by Frank D. Comerford, Person was acquitted on grounds of self-defense.

As replacement workers became more proficient, public awareness of the strike waned. The A.F.L. discontinued strike benefits at the end of October 1914, and quietly called an end to the strike eight months later. The shopmen would strike again in 1922.
