= Carnival of Blood =

1972 American slasher film

- Directed by: Leonard Kirtman
- Screenplay by: Leonard Kirtman
- Produced by: Leonard Kirtman
- Starring: Earle Edgerton; Judith Resnick; Burt Young
- Cinematography: David Howe
- Edited by: Harvey Kopel
- Distributed by: Kirt Films International
- Release date: June 16, 1972 (El Paso, Texas)
- Running time: 87 minutes
- Country: United States
- Language: English

Carnival of Blood is a 1972 American slasher film written and directed by Leonard Kirtman, and starring Earle Edgerton, Judith Resnick, and Burt Young in his feature film debut. It follows a serial killer murdering patrons at a small-town carnival.

== Plot ==
At an amusement park, a fortune teller reads the future of young, bickering married couple Claire and Harry. She advises them to leave the carnival, warning of impending doom. After Harry wins Claire a teddy bear at a dart game, the two subsequently go on a dark ride. Upon exiting, Claire is found to be decapitated in their cart, horrifying the other park patrons waiting in line. Gimpy, a hunchbacked carnival worker who runs the dart game, carries away Claire's teddy bear as medical examiners remove her body.

The next day, art student Laura is notified by her attorney boyfriend, Dan, that he has been assigned the case on Claire's murder. Laura gets into an argument with Dan over the phone about the assignment, worried he is risking their safety. Laura is consoled by their middle-aged neighbor, Tom, who suggests she go meet Dan and reconcile over their argument. Laura visits the park and spends the evening there with Dan. A drunken sailor then wins a giant teddy bear at the dart game, and gifts it to Laura.

After a strange reading from the fortune teller, Dan convinces Laura to go on the dark ride where Claire was murdered, much to her reluctance. The fortune teller subsequently gives a reading to the sailor and a prostitute, foretelling a similar doomed fate. The sailor brings the prostitute under a pier to have sex, and drunkenly stumbles away. The prostitute sees a man in the shadows and mistakes him for the sailor, only to be viciously stabbed by the figure. Laura hears her screams, and she and Dan run beneath the pier to find the prostitute's disemboweled corpse.

Tom and Gimpy get into an argument, and Tom invites Gimpy to his apartment for a beer as a peace offering. Tom's apartment is filled with the carnival's prize teddy bears, which, he tells Gimpy, are his "real friends." The next day, a crass, overweight blonde woman visits the amusement park, and is given another grim fortune from the fortune teller. The blonde woman subsequently visits Gimpy's dart stand, and is angered when she fails to win a teddy bear. The blonde woman insults several other park patrons before she is cornered in an alleyway by an assailant who gouges out her eyeballs before bludgeoning her to death.

Laura and Dan get into another argument at their apartment, and Dan leaves after Laura insists that she is too invested in the murder case. Laura takes the prize teddy bear and angrily covers it in black paint. Laura visits the amusement park again and complains to Tom, who denigrates her after she tells him she destroyed the bear, calling her a "selfish slut." Laura flees the dart stand, after which Gimpy accuses Tom of being the killer. Tom responds by stabbing Gimpy to death. Meanwhile, Dan visits Tom's apartment and discovers human intestines and eyeballs stuffed inside one of the teddy bears, prompting him to flee to the amusement park to apprehend him.

Meanwhile, Laura is stalked through the park by Tom, during which she finds Gimpy's corpse. Tom corners Laura and forces her onto a ride, and unsuccessfully attempts to push her to her death. He then forces her onto the ferris wheel, ranting and raving, calling her "mommy" and telling her he must kill her for hurting his father. Laura senses Tom has reverted to a traumatized childhood state, and attempts to placate him. Tom recalls a childhood memory during which his mother forbade him from sleeping with his teddy bear, locking him alone in his bedroom while having an affair with another man. When Tom's father returned home and discovered the affair, a fight erupted during which the house caught on fire.

As the ferris wheel cart reaches the ground, Tom leaps off and runs into the street, only to be hit by an oncoming car. Dan arrives in the melee, and he and Laura rush to Tom's side. Tom apologizes to Laura before dying.

== Cast ==
- Earle Edgerton as Tom
- Judith Resnick as Laura
- Martin Barolsky as Dan
- Kaly Mills as The Fortune Teller
- Burt Young as Gimpy (as John Harris)
- Linda Kurtz as Claire
- William Grannell as Harry (as William Grinell)
- Glen Kimberley as The Sailor
- Eve Packer as The Sailor's Date
- Gloria Spivak as The Dumpy Woman

== Production ==
The film was shot at Coney Island in New York City in 1970.

== Release ==
Carnival of Blood was released in 1972 as a double feature alongside Curse of the Headless Horseman, with an opening date in El Paso, Texas on June 16, 1972.

Something Weird Video released the film on DVD as a double feature with Curse of the Headless Horseman in 2002. In November 2021, the American Genre Film Archive (AGFA) released the film on Blu-ray in a triple-feature set along with Help Me... I'm Possessed (1976) and Night of the Strangler (1972).
