= Dorothy Green (actress) =

American actress (1920–2008)

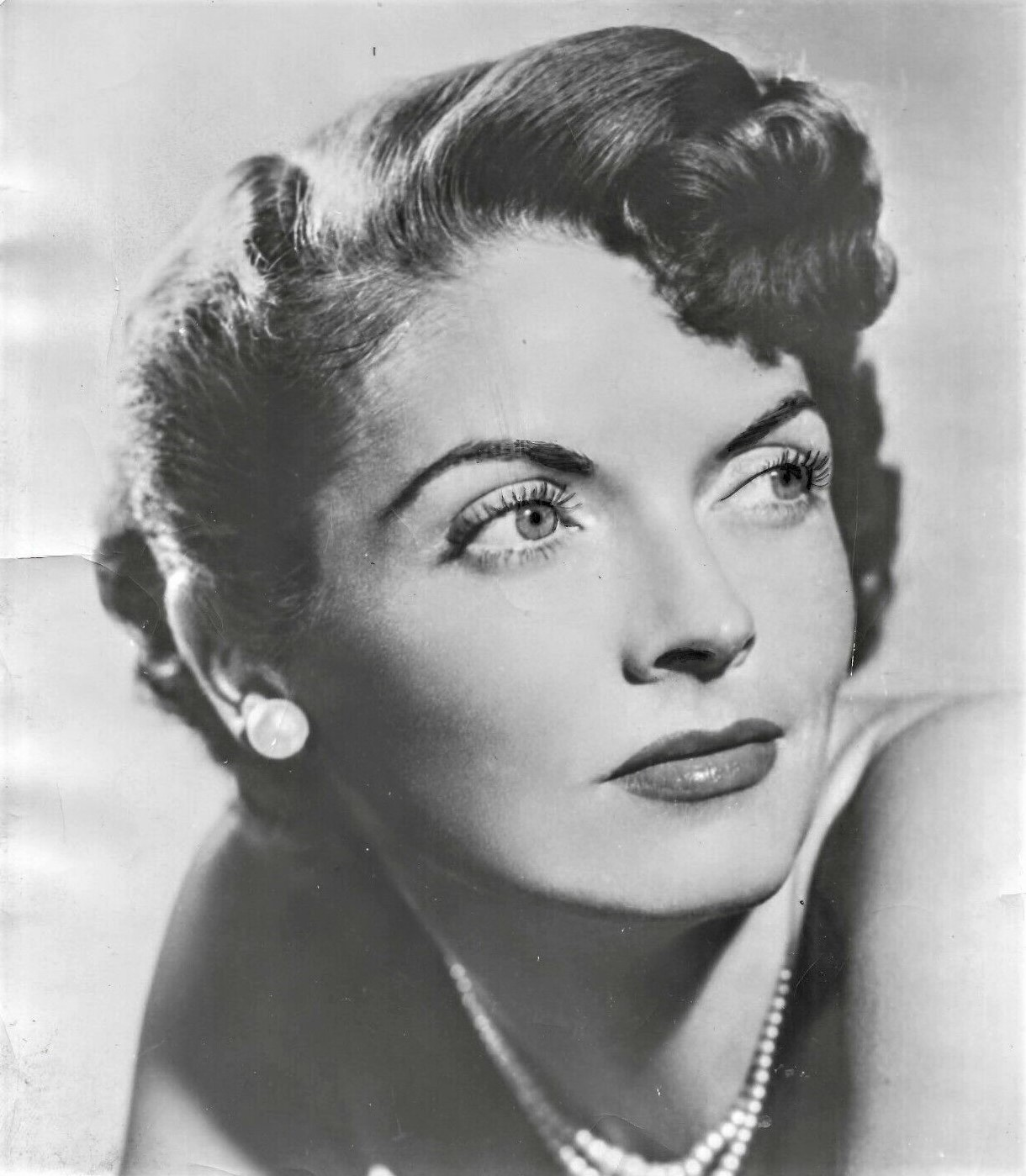
- Green in 1955
- Born: Dorothy Jeanette Hufford; January 12, 1920; Los Angeles, U.S.
- Died: May 8, 2008 (aged 88); Los Angeles, U.S.
- Occupation: Actress
- Years active: 1953–1997
- Spouse(s): Wallace W. Woodson (m. 1939; div. 19??) Dr. Sidney Green (m. 1941; died 1964) Sydney Miller (m. 1967; div. 1984) Dr. Arthur Heller (m. ??; died 2003)
- Children: 3

Dorothy Green (born Dorothy Jeanette Hufford; January 12, 1920 – May 8, 2008) was an American stage, film, and television actress. Her career spanned more than four decades, with her work principally being in supporting roles on many popular television series from the early 1950s into the 1980s.

== Early life ==
Born in Los Angeles, California, in 1920, Green was raised in an upper middle-class family, the eldest child of Russell and Gladys Hufford. Her father, according to the federal census of 1930, was the owner of an automobile shop. That census also shows that she had two brothers by 1930, Warren and William, and that a "servant" resided full-time in the Huffords' home in Santa Monica, an indication of the family's somewhat elevated financial circumstances.

As a child and later as a young woman, Green had neither aspirations nor intentions to be an actress. She married for the first time in 1939, but that union soon ended. She married again in 1941, this time to a dentist, Dr. Sydney Green. They subsequently had three children, and by 1950, she seemed settled into an established family life, the traditional course for most wives and mothers at the time. One day, however, an incidental social contact at a local charity event changed the course of Green's life and destined her for a career in entertainment. In the coastal neighborhood of Pacific Palisades in western Los Angeles, while volunteering her time to model clothes in a fashion show to raise money for a charity, she impressed the wife of a local talent agent. The woman mentioned Green to her husband, who soon contacted her. The agent, too, was impressed with Green's beauty and poise, and he encouraged her to pursue acting. She initially hesitated to do so, but her husband encouraged her, as well, to give acting a try. She did, and after a few months of training with a drama coach, Green began performing on stage for the Manhattan Playhouse, a theater group located near her home in Manhattan Beach. Her first role was that of Irene in the group's production of Light Up the Sky by Moss Hart.

She was a contestant on the Groucho Marx quiz show You Bet Your Life on February 8, 1950.

== Film and television career ==
After some additional performances in other productions presented by the Manhattan Playhouse, Green got her first professional job on television, on a live broadcast of the Jack Benny Program, in April 1953. She was cast in the supporting role of an office secretary in a sketch with Benny and his guest star, comedian Fred Allen. That same year, Green obtained several other roles on television and in films, including a part in the film noir thriller The Big Heat, starring Glenn Ford and Gloria Grahame. For the remainder of the 1950s and into the 1970s, Green received many other acting opportunities in movies and on episodes in a wide variety of television series. Some examples of the latter are the Adventures of the Falcon, The Pepsi-Cola Playhouse, The Whistler, Mike Hammer, Studio 57, Casey Jones, The Real McCoys, Sugarfoot, Panic!, Walt Disney's Wonderful World of Color, Gunsmoke, (as Julie in “Caleb” S9E26) The Life and Legend of Wyatt Earp, 77 Sunset Strip, Thriller, The Investigators, Perry Mason, Wagon Train, Rawhide, Hawaiian Eye, Bonanza, My Three Sons, Kraft Mystery Theater, The Munsters, Tammy, The Virginian, Daniel Boone, Ironside, Mannix, Hawaii Five-O, Adam-12, and Emergency!

In many of the previously noted television series, Green had significant supporting roles. One example of those performances is her role as Nancy Nagle on a 1960 episode of Gunsmoke titled "Say Uncle". In that episode's storyline, set in Dodge City, Kansas, in the 1870s, Green plays a wife whose husband is killed under suspicious circumstances while working with his wayward brother. Green's character must then contend with the anger of her vengeance-filled son and his intentions to hold his uncle accountable for his father's "accidental" death.

During the years when Green was busy acting on television, she also continued to perform in films. Those films include Bad for Each Other (1953), Them! (1954, uncredited), Finger Man (1955), Trial (1955, uncredited), No Time to Be Young (1957), The Helen Morgan Story (1957), The Restless Years (1958), Face of a Fugitive (1959), Man-Trap (1961), It Happened at the World's Fair (1963), Critic's Choice (1963), Palm Springs Weekend (1963), Zebra in the Kitchen (1965), Tammy and the Millionaire (1967), and Suppose They Gave a War and Nobody Came (1970).

Green also appeared on some weekly television series during the 1970s, although most of her work in that period was in the long running soap opera The Young & the Restless. For four years, beginning in 1973, she played the character Jennifer, the matriarch of the Brooks family in the daily series. After her work on The Young and the Restless, Green appeared on just four sitcoms between 1977 and 1981: The Love Boat, Fish, Hello, Larry, and Benson. Her final credited appearance on television was in 1997, in the role of Anna Lundt on the Canadian-produced television series Exhibit A: Secrets of Forensic Science.

== Personal life and death ==
Green was married four times. According to 1939 Los Angeles County records, her first husband was Wallace Wade Woodson, who was a 28-year-old native of Montana living in San Fernando, California. Only 19 at the time, she married Woodson on March 12, 1939. That marriage lasted only a short time, for two years later she married Dr. Sydney Green. They remained together for 23 years, until his death in 1964. Dorothy then remarried in 1967, to director/actor Sydney Miller after working with him on the film Tammy and the Millionaire. Following her divorce from Miller in 1984, she married Dr. Arthur Heller, a dentist like her second husband. Heller and she remained together until his death from Alzheimer's disease in 2003. Green was Jewish.

On May 8, 2008, Green died of natural causes after suffering a heart attack at her home in Los Angeles. She was 88 years old.

== Partial filmography ==
- The Big Heat (1953) – Lucy Chapman
- Bad for Each Other (1953) – Ada Nicoletti
- Them! (1954) – Matron (uncredited)
- Finger Man (1955)
- Trial (1955) – Mrs. Mary Ackerman (uncredited)
- No Time to Be Young (1957) – Mrs. Doris Dexter
- The Helen Morgan Story (1957) – Mrs. Wade
- The Restless Years (1958) – Laura Fisher
- Face of a Fugitive (1959) – Ellen Bailey
- Man-Trap (1961) – Vera Snavely
- It Happened at the World's Fair (1963) – Miss Ettinger
- Critic's Choice (1963) – Mrs. Margaret Champlain
- Palm Springs Weekend (1963) – Cora Dixon
- Zebra in the Kitchen (1965) – Anne Carlyle
- Tammy and the Millionaire (1967) – Lavinia Tate
- Suppose They Gave a War and Nobody Came (1970) – Mrs. Kruft
- Help Me... I'm Possessed (1976) – Edith – The Castle Dweller

== Television ==
- Wagon Train (1959–1962) – Helen Lerner in S2.E20 "The Old Man Charvanaugh Story" (1959); Sabrina Tucker in S3.E18 "The Clayton Tucker Story" (1960); and Ethel Muskie in S5.E23 "The Charlie Shutup Story" (1962)
- Perry Mason (1961) – Ida Albright in S4:E24 "The Case of the Violent Vest" and - Carlotta Thielman in S5:E16 "The Case of the Shapely Shadow" (1962)
- Rawhide (1961) – Eleanor Bradley in S3:E15, "Incident of the Fish Out of Water"
- Gunsmoke (1964) – Julie in S9:E26, "Caleb"
- Bonanza (1964) – S6:E30 "Lothario Larking"
