= Lynne Marta =

American actress (1945–2024)

- Marta in 1974
- Born: October 30, 1945; Somerville, New Jersey, U.S.
- Died: January 11, 2024 (aged 78); Los Angeles, California, U.S.
- Occupations: Actress, singer
- Years active: 1966–2004
- Spouse: Brick Huston (m. 1968; div. 1976)

Lynne Marta (October 30, 1945 – January 11, 2024), also credited as Lynn Marta, was an American actress and singer.

== Career ==
Marta's first screen credit was in 1966 in an episode of the comedy series Gidget. She was a regular on the syndicated variety program The Lloyd Thaxton Show and on the anthology series Love, American Style (1969-1974). Her career was largely as a guest player on episodic television, and she often made multiple appearances on the same series as different characters (including The F.B.I.; Cannon; Medical Center; The Streets of San Francisco; Barnaby Jones; Trapper John, M.D. and Vega$).

During the mid-late 1970s, she appeared (as different characters) in three separate episodes of Starsky & Hutch. She appeared in episodes of ER; Caroline in the City; Designing Women; Gunsmoke; Matt Houston; Law & Order; Charlie's Angels; The Rockford Files; Kojak; Marcus Welby, M.D.; CHiPs; and The Rookies. She also appeared in the daytime soap operas Passions, The Young and the Restless, and Days of Our Lives.

== Personal life and death ==
Born in Somerville, New Jersey, on October 30, 1945, Marta was one of two daughters born to George Marta, a first-generation Italian-American, and his wife, Ruth.

From 1968 to 1976, Marta was married to fellow television actor Brick Huston, who died in 2018.

In 1983, People magazine reported that Marta and actor David Soul had an "open relationship" in the 1970s. The article explained, "All through the Starsky and Hutch years David and Lynne lived together but spent time with other people." Soul died seven days before her.

Marta was an eyewitness to the murder of actress Rebecca Schaeffer in 1989.

Marta died from cancer in Los Angeles, on January 11, 2024, at the age of 78.

== Filmography ==
- 1971: Red Sky at Morning as Venery Ann Cloyd
- 1972: Joe Kidd as Elma
- 1972: 43: The Richard Petty Story as Lynda Petty
- 1972: The Rookies as Andrea
- 1973: Genesis II as Harper-Smythe
- 1975: Adams of Eagle Lake as Cindy
- 1975: Starsky & Hutch as Cheryl
- 1976: Help Me... I'm Possessed as Melanie Blackwood
- 1976: Once an Eagle as Celia Harrodson
- 1977: In the Glitter Palace as Ricki
- 1977: Barnaby Jones as Lorraine
- 1978: CHiPs as Beth Holmes
- 1978: The Rockford Files - Heartaches of a Fool S5 E1 as Carrie Strayhorn
- 1980: Blood Beach as Jo
- 1980: Homeward Bound as Mary Jo Lawson
- 1984: Footloose as Lulu Warnicker
- 1985: Crime of Innocence as Lucille (uncredited)
- 1990: The First Power as Nun
- 1990: Columbo: Uneasy Lies the Crown as Frances
- 1990: 3 Men and a Little Lady as Morgan, School Teacher
- 1993: A Case for Murder as Marti Stevens
- 1993: Message from Nam as Nurse #2
- 1996: Race Against Time: The Search for Sarah as Matron
- 1997: Sleeping with the Devil as Judge Eberhardt
- 2002: Time of Fear as Mrs. LeDoux
