= No Time to Be Young =

1957 film by David Lowell Rich

- Directed by: David Lowell Rich (as David Rich)
- Screenplay by: Raphael Hayes; John McPartland
- Story by: John McPartland
- Produced by: Wallace MacDonald
- Starring: Robert Vaughn
- Cinematography: Henry Freulich
- Edited by: Jerome Thoms
- Color process: Black and white
- Production company: Columbia Pictures
- Distributed by: Columbia Pictures
- Release date: August 1957
- Running time: 81 minutes
- Country: United States
- Language: English

No Time to Be Young is a 1957 American crime film noir directed by David Lowell Rich and introducing Robert Vaughn in his first starring feature film role.

== Plot ==
The story follows the troubled lives of three young men, friends since high school, who have reached breaking points. The first is a college dropout, and draft dodger, who is involved with a woman old enough to be his mother. He formulates a plan to rob a Dorr's supermarket so he can purchase a boat and escape his problems. The second fellow works at Dorr's and feels that he is ready to marry a certain waitress at a coffee shop where the three men hang out. She plays with his affection and likes to have a good time with more mature men. After a date, the two try to sneak into her home through a top-floor window; she falls and is critically injured. He feels responsible and wants to pay her medical bills. The third is a failed writer who has lied about having a budding literary career in order to persuade a girl to marry him and to impress her father. His lie is discovered and his wife rejects him.

The three attempt the robbery, during which the dropout gets too wired and kills the manager. They flee, but the dropout's cohorts are captured by the cops while he steals a truck and heads screaming down the road for Mexico. A chase ensues until the truck's brakes fail and he crashes over a cliff.

== Cast ==
- Robert Vaughn as Buddy Root
- Roger Smith as Bob Miller
- Tom Pittman as Stu Bradley
- Dorothy Green as Mrs. Doris Dexter
- Merry Anders as Gloria Stuben
- Kathy Nolan as Tina Parner Bradley
- Sarah Selby as Mrs. Helen Root

Note: In a case of art imitating life, Vaughn had actually been drafted into the U.S. Army two years before, and Pittman died the year following the film's release when his vehicle crashed over a cliff like the climax.

== Release ==
No Time to Be Young was released in theatres in August 1957. The film was released on DVD on March 4, 2011.
