= Casey Jones—the Union Scab =

Parody of Ballad of Casey Jones

Joe Hill memorial edition of the I.W.W. songbook, published in 1916.

"Casey Jones—the Union Scab" is a song, written by labor figure Joe Hill in San Pedro, California, shortly after the first day of a nationwide walkout of 40,000 railway employees in the Illinois Central shopmen's strike of 1911. It is a parody of the song "The Ballad of Casey Jones."

The song is not historically accurate: Casey Jones was an active, dues-paying member of two labor unions (the Brotherhood of Locomotive Firemen and the Brotherhood of Locomotive Engineers) that both paid out life insurance to his widow.

The song was published in the Little Red Songbook in 1912. The song was included in a 2006 album of American folk songs "Classic Labor Songs from Smithsonian Folkways" released by the Smithsonian Institution.

Recordings of Joe Hill's lyrics exist by Utah Phillips, and by Pete Seeger; translations into foreign language include one in Russian, by Leonid Utyosov.

== Composition ==
Unlike other songs about Casey Jones, where Jones is portrayed as a folk hero comparable to Paul Bunyan, Hill's parody challenges the character of the loyal worker.

Casey Jones, went to Hell a-flying,

"Casey Jones," the Devil said, "Oh fine!

Casey Jones, get busy shoveling sulphur–

That's what you get for scabbing on the S.P. line."

— Joe Hill, Casey Jones, the Union Scab

In Hill's lyrics, the workers of the S.P. line (referring to the Southern Pacific Railroad) have called for a strike, but Casey Jones continues running his train, despite its state of disrepair. After ignoring the workers' pleas to join the strike, Jones' train runs off the track and into the river. In heaven Saint Peter learns Casey was the S.P. engineer who broke the strike, and hires him to replace striking angel musicians. In the final verse, the angel's union confronts Casey and throws him down to Hell.

A version of the song, collected from western miners, includes a verse in which the striking workers lay railroad ties on the track, causing Casey's demise.

In satirizing the working-class hero, Hill critiqued the attempts by the Harriman and Illinois Central Railroad system to separate railroad workers by refusing to recognize the joint demands of nine separate craft unions.

In Joe Hill's biography, author Gibbs M. Smith wrote "It was the 'Union Scab' Hill satirized in his 'Casey Jones,' referring no particular individual but to all union men who moved trains during the strike."

== Legacy ==
The lyrics of "Casey Jones–The Union Scab" were read out in court during the 1917 trial of eleven I.W.W. strikers in Australia. The song's violent lyrics, despite their satirical nature, were used by the prosecution as evidence of union conspiracy.

== See also ==
- Wobbly lingo
- List of train songs
- List of songs about Casey Jones
