= Vaughan, Mississippi =

- Unincorporated community
- Location within the state of Mississippi Vaughan, Mississippi (the United States)
- Coordinates: 32°48′23″N 90°02′30″W
- Country: United States
- State: Mississippi
- County: Yazoo
- Elevation: 210 ft (64 m)
- Time zone: UTC-6 (Central (CST))
  - Summer (DST): UTC-5 (CDT)
- ZIP code: 39179
- Area code: 662
- GNIS feature ID: 679194

Vaughan (also Vaughans or Vaughn) is an unincorporated community in Yazoo County, Mississippi. The settlement is 32 mi (51 km) east of Yazoo City.

== History ==
Vaughan was founded in 1830 and named for Henry Vaughan, who had established a plantation nearby. The town was established on an old stagecoach line and was for many years the main trading center of Yazoo County, including a large part of Madison County east of the Big Black River.

=== Casey Jones' railroad accident ===
The famous railroad accident that killed 37-year-old engineer Casey Jones happened near Vaughan in the early morning hours of April 30, 1900. On July 24, 1953, a ceremony was held at Vaughan, where more than 3,000 persons gathered to witness the unveiling of a bronze marker at the spot where Casey met his fate. In attendance were Sim Webb, Casey's fireman, and Janie Jones, Casey's widow. Beneath Casey's name, the following legend appeared: "A famous ballad, the folklore of American railroading, and a postage stamp commemorate the colorful and courageous engineer who was killed in a wreck here in 1900." The marker is now missing; however, its post remains and can be found at the following coordinates: 32.816590°N 90.038428°W. No plans by the State of Mississippi have been made to replace it.

The Casey Jones Railroad Museum State Park at Vaughan was designated a State Park on April 27, 1980. The museum began as a project of Massena Jones (no relation) in a building he owned across the road from the present site. The centerpiece of it was the damaged bell that was salvaged from the wreck site. In 2004 the museum closed, and years later, the depot was moved to West, Mississippi.

=== Education ===
Residents are a part of the Yazoo County School District, and are zoned to Linwood Elementary School (in Vaughan), Yazoo County Middle School and Yazoo County High School.

== Notable person ==
- Laurin Pepper, professional baseball player
