= The Ballad of Casey Jones =

Traditional song about railroad engineer Casey Jones

Song
- Written: circa 1909
- Songwriters: Composer: Eddie Newton; Lyricist: Wallace Saunders, T. Lawrence Seibert

"The Ballad of Casey Jones", also known as "Casey Jones, the Brave Engineer" or simply "Casey Jones", is a traditional American folk song about railroad engineer Casey Jones and his death at the controls of the train he was driving. It tells of how Jones and his fireman Sim Webb raced their locomotive to make up for lost time, but discovered another train ahead of them on the line, and how Jones remained on board to try to stop the train as Webb jumped to safety. It is song number 3247 in the Roud Folk Song Index.

The song helped to preserve the memory of Jones' feat down through the years in its 40-plus versions and enhanced Casey's legendary status, to the extent that he has even come to be seen as something of a mythological figure (like Pecos Bill, Paul Bunyan, or John Henry) to the uninformed. Books and pulp magazines about the railroad and its heroes helped to perpetuate his memory as well.

== History ==
Soon after Casey's death, the song was first sung by engine wiper and friend of Casey's named Wallace Saunders to the tune of a popular song of the time known as "Jimmie Jones." He was known to sing and whistle as he went about his work cleaning the steam engines. In the words of Casey's wife: "Wallace's admiration of Casey was little short of idolatry. He used to brag mightily about Mr. Jones even when Casey was only a freight engineer." But Saunders never had his original version copyrighted, and thus there is no way of knowing precisely what words he sang.

As railroaders stopped in Canton, Mississippi, they would pick up the song and pass it along. Soon it was a hit up and down the I.C. line. But it was up to others with a profit motive to take it and rework it for a nationwide audience. Illinois Central Engineer William Leighton appreciated the song's potential enough to tell his brothers Frank and Bert Leighton, who were vaudeville performers, about it. They took it and sang it in theaters around the country with a chorus they added. But apparently even they neglected to get it copyrighted.

Reportedly, Saunders received a bottle of gin for the use of the song. Nothing more was heard from him after this, and he is now known only for preserving the legend of Casey Jones.

Finally, with vaudeville performers T. Lawrence Seibert credited with the lyrics and Eddie Newton with the music, it was published and offered for sale in 1909 with the title "Casey Jones, The Brave Engineer". As their intent was to entertain, it was hailed on the cover of the sheet music as the "Greatest Comedy Hit In Years" and "The Only Comedy Railroad Song." This version was the one that was strenuously objected to by Casey's widow, for making her appear to have been unfaithful to Casey. The offending lines read: "Mrs. Jones sat on her bed a sighing/Just received a message that Casey was dying/ Said go to bed children and hush your crying/Cause you got another papa on the Salt Lake line." This is similar to a line in the song "Duncan and Brady". She spent her remaining years refuting those lines, once saying "That devil hasn't shown up in 58 years!"

By World War I, dozens of versions had been published and millions of copies were sold, securing the memory of a new American folk hero. Poet Carl Sandburg called the song "Casey Jones, the Brave Engineer" the "greatest ballad ever written". Casey Jones figures in many railroad songs, such as "Freight Train Boogie", by the Delmore Brothers.

== Recordings ==
- Collins & Harlan (1910, Columbia A907)
- Billy Murray as "The Ballad of Casey Jones" (1912, Edison Blue Amberol 1550)
- American Folklife recording (1932)
- The Dixieaires (1949)
- Burl Ives (1954, Decca 29129)
- Milt Okun (1957, Baton BL1203)
- The Golden Gate Quartet (1960)
- Bing Crosby included the song in a medley on his album 101 Gang Songs (1961)
- Merrill Jay Singers (1961, Songs of the Railroad, Viking Record Company)
- Johnny Cash (1963, Blood, Sweat and Tears), featuring lyrics that are closer to the actual event.
- Elizabeth Cotten (1965, Smithsonian Folkways Records, Vol. 3: When I'm Gone)
- Robert De Cormier Singers (Arabesque Z6675)
- Joe Hickerson as Drive Dull Care Away (2002, Folk-Legacy Records)

Several parodies of the song exist, most notably Casey Jones—the Union Scab, which anachronistically depicts Jones as a union strikebreaker who gets his comeuppance. The lyrics were written in 1911 by union activist Joe Hill, and would be recorded by artists such as Utah Phillips and Pete Seeger Other parodies include am eponymous WWII propaganda song by Spike Jones and his City Slickers, featuring a fictional grandson of Jones (Casey Jr.) as a bombardier on the Tokyo Raid, and Allan Sherman's J.C. Cohen, about a New York subway conductor who goes on a wild ride.

"The Ballad of Casey Jones" is distinct from "Casey Jones" by the Grateful Dead and several other songs on the subject by artists such as Mississippi John Hurt and Furry Lewis.

== See also ==
- List of train songs

== Other sources ==
- "A Treasury of American Folklore," by B. A. Botkin, (American Legacy Press, NT, 1944) pp. 241–246)
- April 1932, Erie Railroad Magazine, vol 28, no. 2, p12
