= Mary O'Neal =

Mary O'Neal may refer to:

- Mary Thomas O'Neal (1887–after 1974), Welsh-born American labor activist
- Mary Lovelace O'Neal (1942–2026), American visual artist and arts educator

== See also ==
- Mary O'Neill (disambiguation)
