= Hildreth Frost =

Lawyer and soldier from Colorado

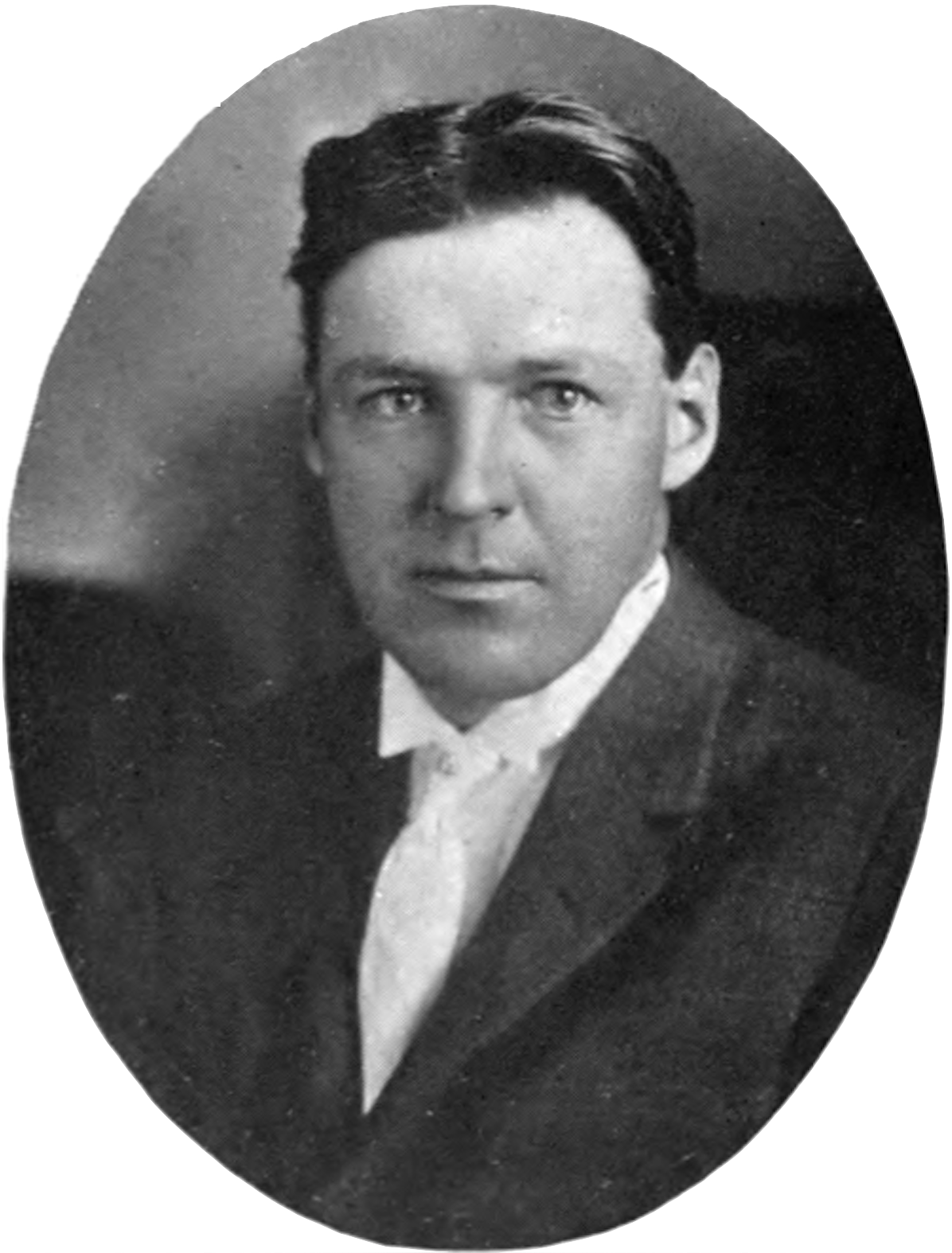
- Hildreth Frost in a Bench and Bar of Colorado handbook, 1917.
- Born: 22 June 1880; Newton, Massachusetts, US
- Died: 1955; Colorado Springs, Colorado, US
- Burial place: Evergreen Cemetery, Colorado Springs
- Education: Colorado College (A.B, 1901), Harvard Law School (LL.B, 1904)
- Spouse: Bertha K. Marcum (m. 1914; died 1942)
- Military career
- Allegiance: United States, Colorado
- Branch: United States Army National Guard Colorado Army National Guard
- Rank: Captain (Colorado National Guard)
- Unit: 2nd Infantry Regiment (Colorado National Guard)
- Conflicts: Colorado Coalfield War; World War I
- Other work: Lawyer

Hildreth Frost (1880–1955) was a lawyer and soldier from Colorado who commanded Company A of the 2nd Infantry Regiment during the Colorado Coalfield War. He also served as Judge Advocate for the military courts-martial for prosecuting members of the Colorado National Guard following the Ludlow Massacre.

== Early life ==
Hildreth Frost was born to Walter Clarence Frost and Ella Hildreth Frost in Newton, Massachusetts on 22 June 1880. Walter Frost was a prominent figure in mining around Cripple Creek and Leadville. Frost received a bachelor's degree from Colorado College in 1901, the same year as the Cripple Creek Strike, and a law degree from Harvard in 1904.

== Colorado Coalfield War ==
On 26 October 1913, Governor of Colorado Elias M. Ammons ordered the Colorado National Guard to deploy to the southern coalfields near Trinidad and Walsenburg in response to violence associated with the United Mine Workers of America strike against the Colorado Fuel and Iron company that had begun on 23 September. Captain Frost led Company A in the strike zone, one of several units deployed. Like other units of the National Guard in the strike zone, Company A began incorporating CF&I mine guards into its ranks.

Company A would remain deployed through the departure of the congressional committee visit and publication of the military report on the strike zone, returning home on 17 April 1914. However, the company's first sergeant and two lieutenants remained and participated in the Ludlow Massacre, where roughly 20 strikers and their families were killed.

Cpt. Frost participated in the northernmost engagement of the conflict, a ten-hour long gun battle in near the mines of Louisville, north of Denver, on 28 April. Two strikebreakers were critically wounded during the battle against the incensed miners.

Following the conflict, several members of the Colorado National Guard, including Lt. Karl Linderfelt and Major Patrick J. Hamrock were court-martialed in relation to the violence at Ludlow and the killing of strike-leader Louis Tikas. Frost participated in the trials, which resulted in no punishments, as Judge Advocate.

== After the Coalfield War ==
In 1912, Frost was described as a "broad-minded and progressive" attorney by The Labor News, a pro-union paper in Colorado Springs. The description also detailed that his "nicely furnished" law office was then located in the Phone Building in Cripple Creek.

Frost married Bertha K. Marcum on 1 October 1914. Frost continued to work as a lawyer and was drafted following the entry of the United States into the First World War, which he had penned several newspaper opinion pieces against in the years preceding it, citing his experience during the 1913-1914 strike. He also continued working in the mining industry, taking possession of at least one liquidated mining operation in 1918.

Frost died in 1955. His son Hildreth Frost Jr. would be appointed by President Richard Nixon as assayer for the Denver Mint in 1970.
