= Alma V. Lafferty =

American suffragist, clubwoman, and politician

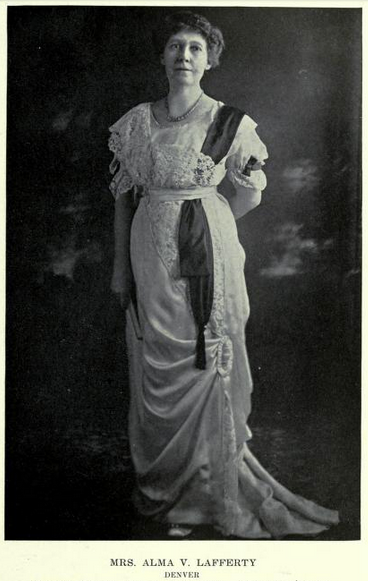
- Alma V. Lafferty, from a 1911 publication.
- Born: Alma V. Short; October 12, 1854; Pennsylvania
- Died: November 17, 1928 (aged 74); Glendale, California
- Occupation: Politician
- Spouse: William S. Lafferty

Alma V. Short Lafferty (October 12, 1854 – November 17, 1928) was an American suffragist, clubwoman, and politician. She served two terms in the Colorado House of Representatives, from 1908 to 1912.

== Early life ==
Alma V. Short was born in western Pennsylvania, the daughter of David Short (a Scottish immigrant) and Martha Adams Short. She lived in Kansas before settling in Colorado.

== Career ==
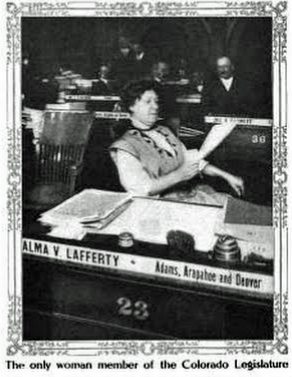
Alma V. Lafferty, at her seat in the Colorado state legislature, from a 1909 publication.

Alma V. Short was active in the suffrage effort in Colorado in the early 1890s, and in the leadership of the Woman's Club of Denver. She was elected to the Colorado House of Representatives in 1908. She served two terms as a state representative, the only woman in the state legislature at the time. She chaired the chamber's education committee, and introduced legislation on juvenile justice, alcohol and tobacco sales to minors, teacher certification, and an eight-hour work day for women. "When it comes to making laws for the protection of our children and for the betterment of the conditions of women, who is more capable or better fitted to perform the task than the women themselves?" she wrote in 1909.

She ran for a seat in the Colorado Senate in 1912, but did not win her party's nomination. In 1914 she was president of the Women's Peace Association of Colorado, and with state senator Helen Ring Robinson led a vigil during the violence surrounding the Ludlow Massacre and Colorado Coalfield War. Lafferty also threatened to mobilize thousands of women to march in Denver if the women's organization's concerns about Ludlow were not addressed. In 1923 she attended the Western States Conference of the National Woman's Party.

== Personal life ==
Alma V. Short married William S. Lafferty. They had two children, Herbert (1876-1898) and Edna (Mrs. Abell) (1880-1958). Her son died in the Spanish–American War. She died at her daughter's home in Glendale, California in 1928, aged 74 years.
