= Colorado Coalfield War =

1913–1914 labor uprising in Colorado, US

- Part of the Coal Wars
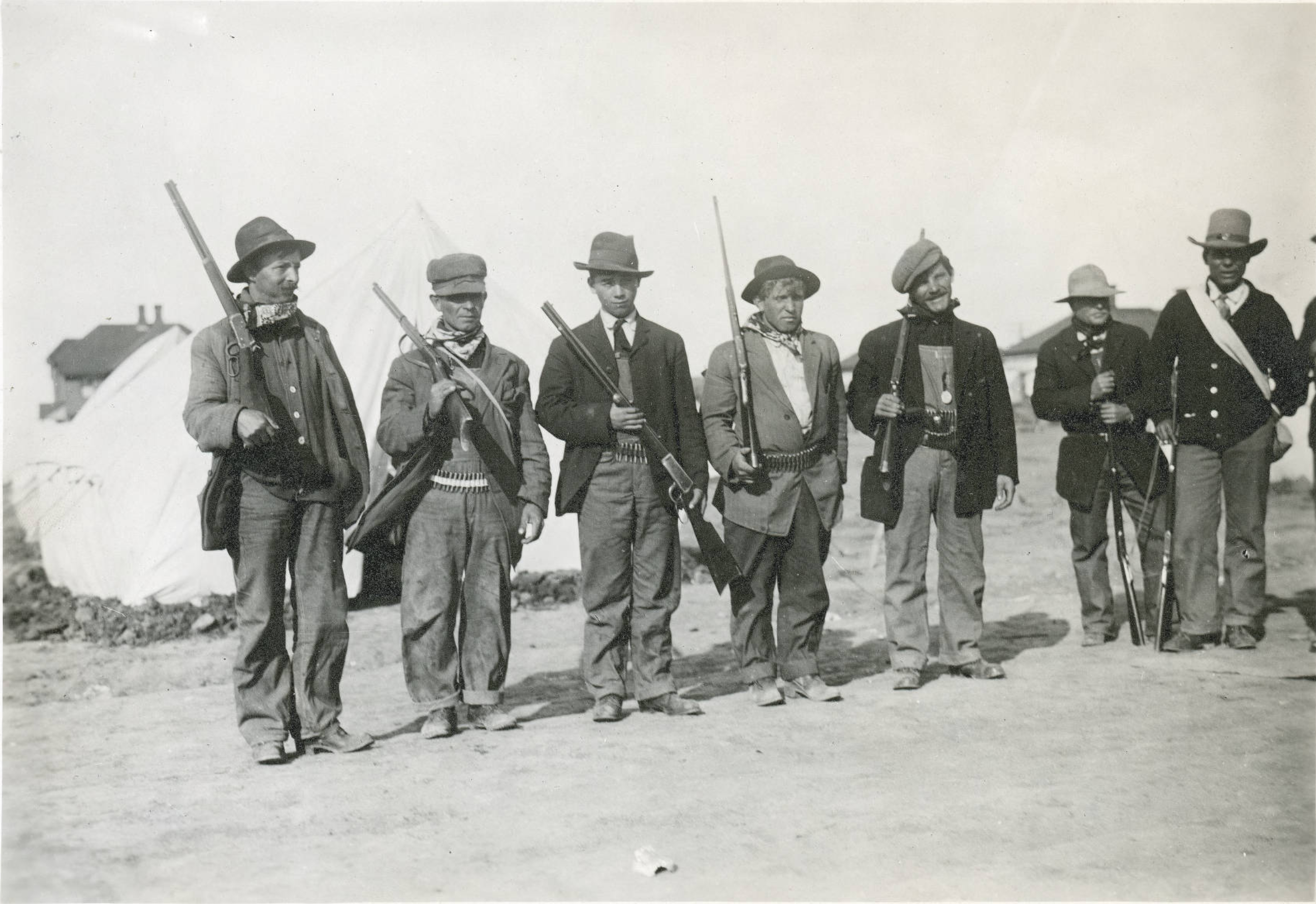
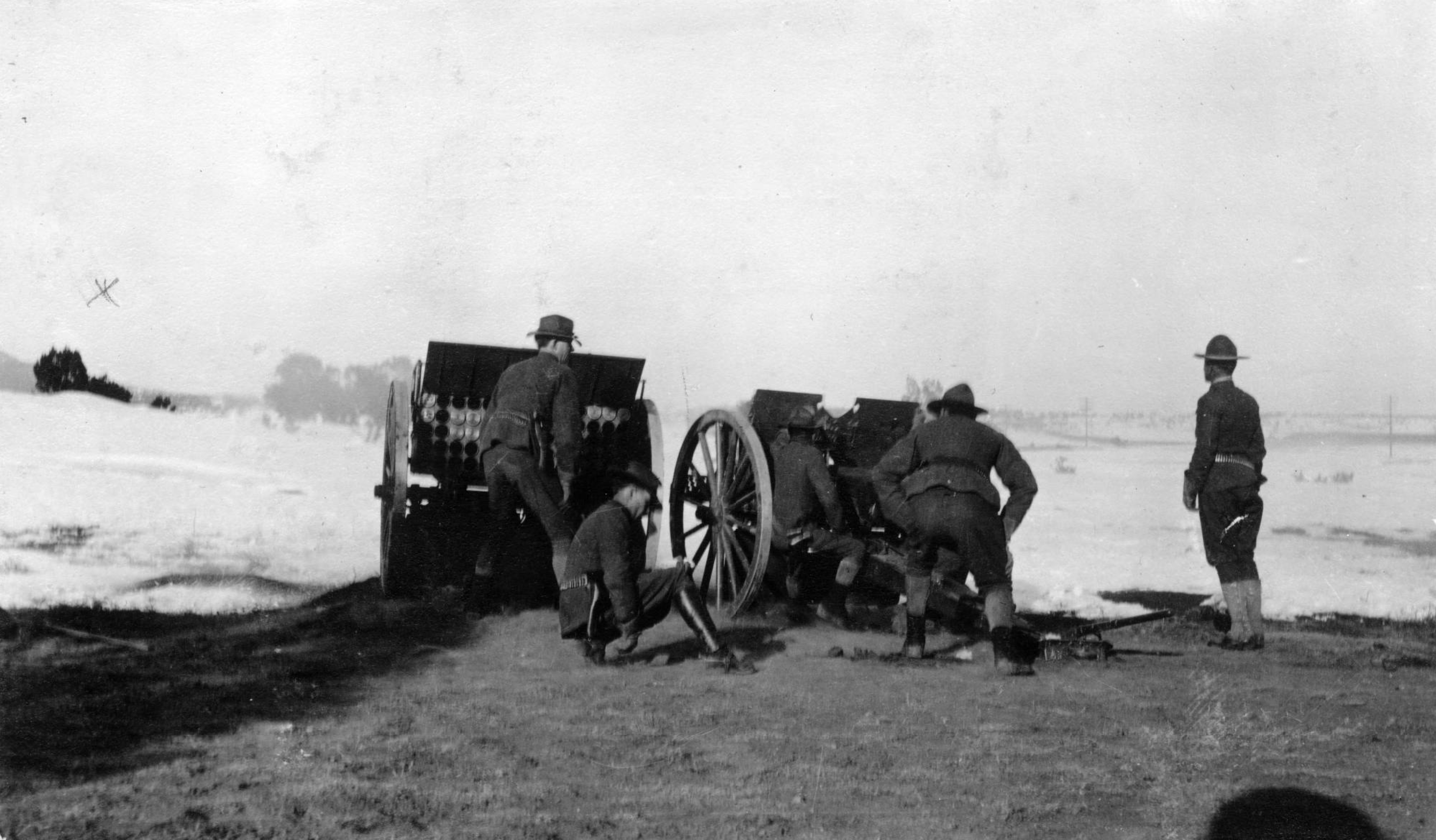
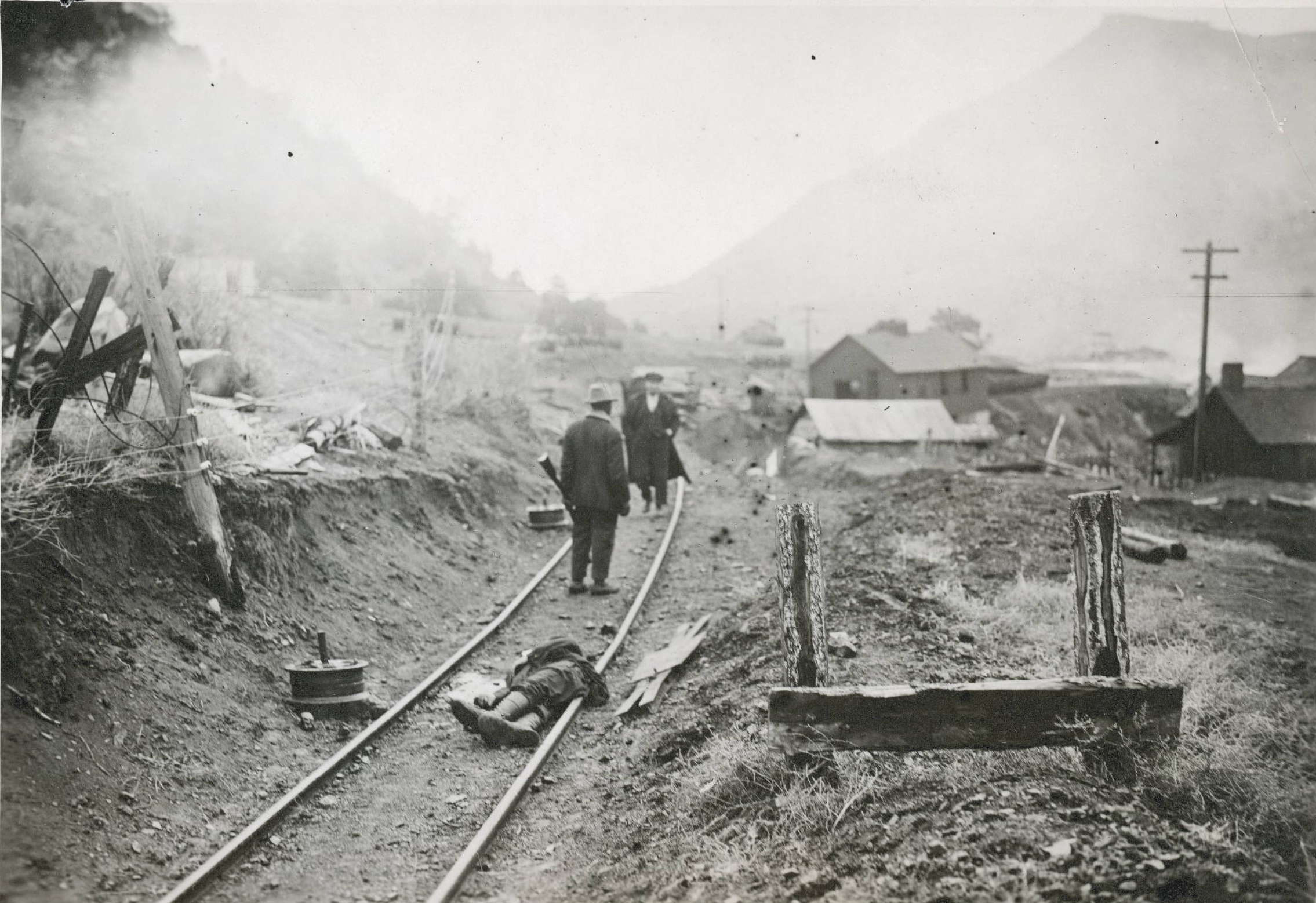
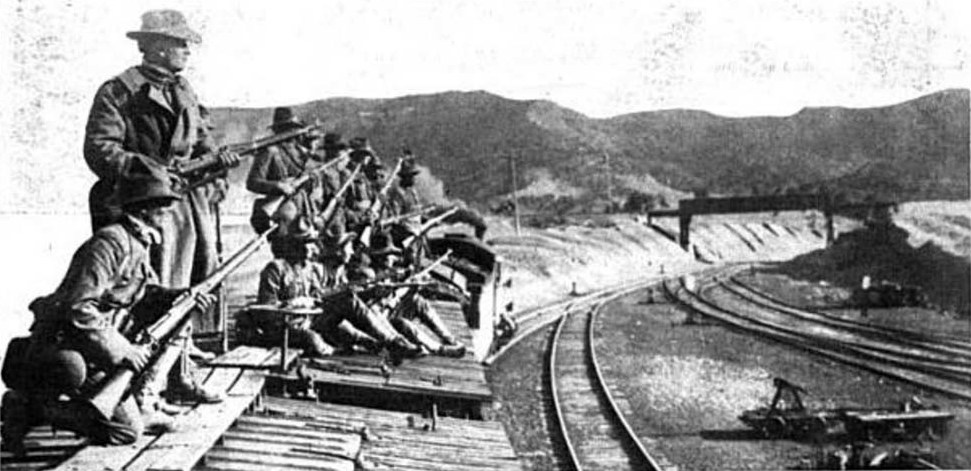
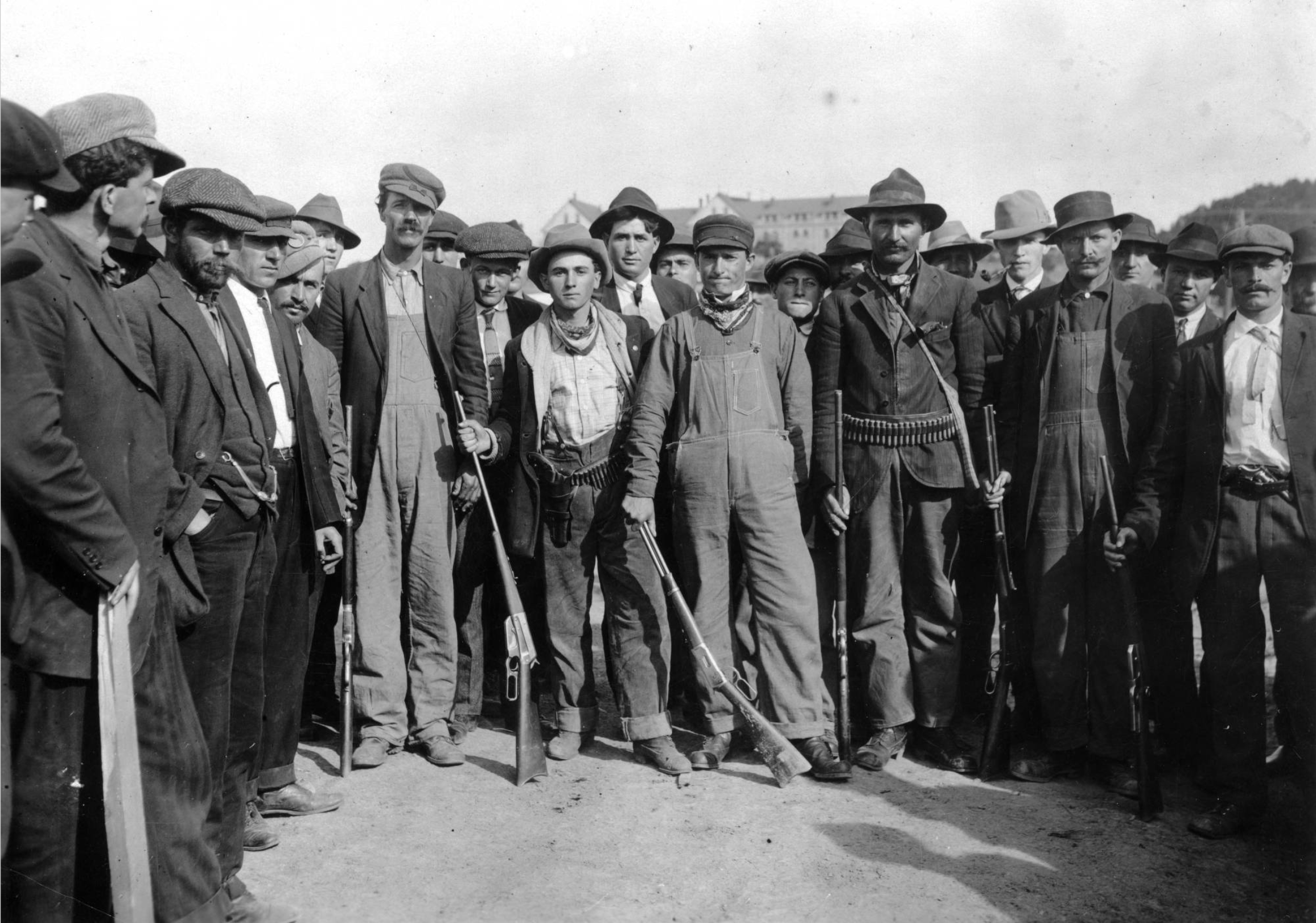
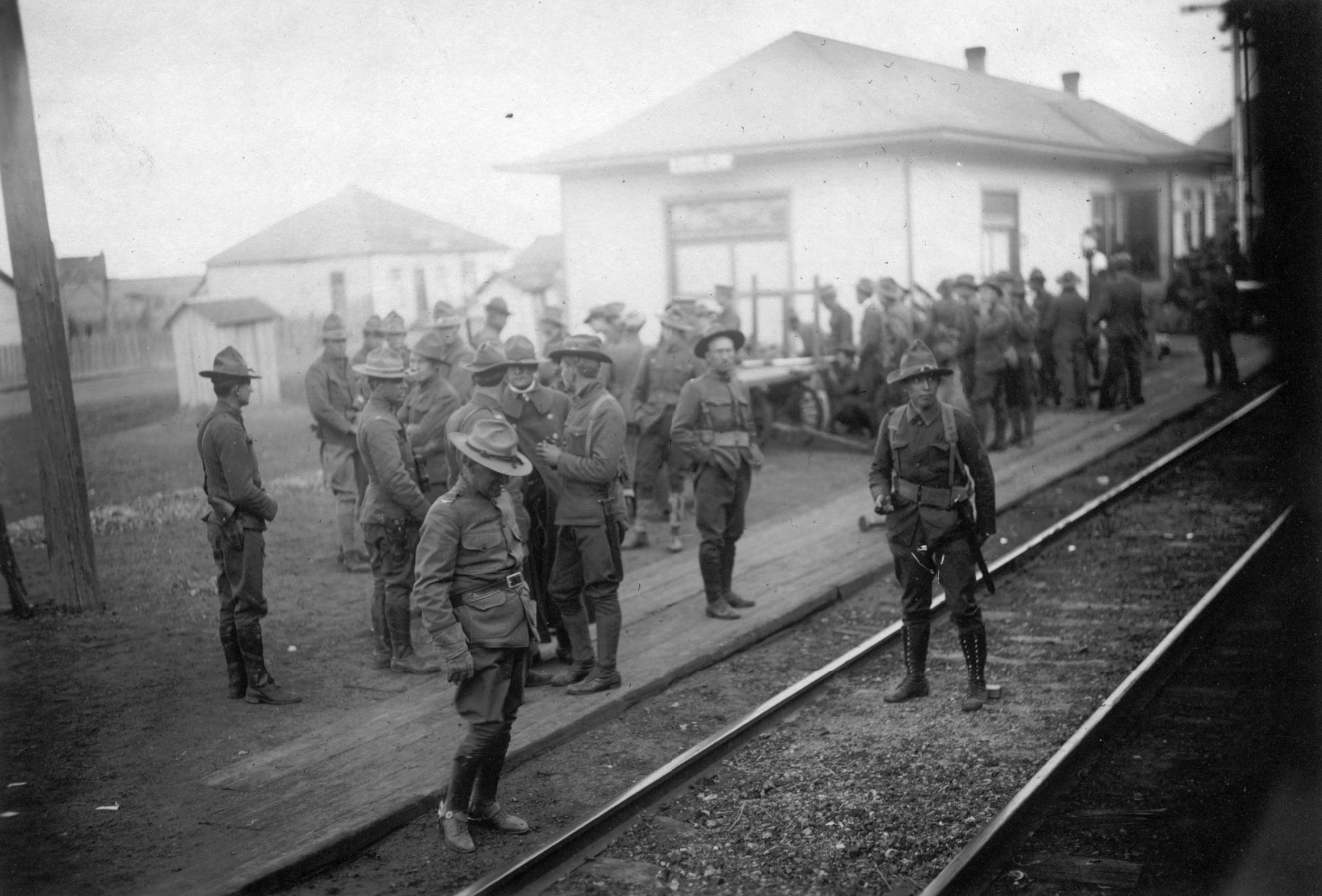
- Clockwise from top left: Armed strikers at Ludlow before the massacre; National Guard artillery practice early in the strike; Colorado National Guardsmen riding atop railcars, Ludlow, 1914; Federal troops arrive at Ludlow; Trinidad under striker control, April 1914; Strikers stand near dead National Guardsman killed during Ten Days War
- Date: First stage: September 23, 1913 – April 20, 1914; Ten Days War: April 20, 1914 – April 30, 1914; Final stage: April 29, 1914 – December 1914
- Location: Southern Colorado, United States
- Result: Strike failed: Federal disarmament of strikers; Union abandons strike following exhaustion of funds; The Rockefeller Plan introduced to internally improve corporate-miner relations

Parties
Colorado Coal miners United Mine Workers of America (UMWA)	Colorado National Guard; Colorado Fuel and Iron (CF&I); Baldwin–Felts Detective Agency; Support from: Rocky Mountain Fuel Company; Victor-American Fuel Company

Lead figures
Strike leaders: Louis Tikas X John R. Lawson (surrendered); Mother Jones	Gov. Elias Ammons; John D. Rockefeller Jr. Adjutant Gen. John Chase; Lt. Karl Linderfelt; John C. Osgood

Number
10,000–12,000 striking miners	Peak Strength: 75 armed detectives 695 enlisted 397 officers (Note: All but two companies of militia and Guardsmen—composed largely of mine guards—withdrawn after six months because of budgetary constraints.)

Casualties and losses
32 strikers killed 400+ arrests	37+ deaths Several troops court-martialed (Note: Lt. Linderfelt was convicted of assault for beating Tikas the day of the massacre.) At least 33 mules
- Total deaths, including Ludlow Massacre: 69–199

The Colorado Coalfield War (Note: While the entirety of the strike-related violence is also commonly called the "Colorado Coal War" and the "Colorado Civil War," some historians use these terms only to refer to the final ten days of intense fighting at the end of April.) was a major labor uprising in the southern and central Colorado Front Range between September 1913 and December 1914. Striking began in late summer 1913, organized by the United Mine Workers of America (UMWA) against the Rockefeller-owned Colorado Fuel and Iron (CF&I) and other corporate mining enterprises after years of deadly working conditions and low pay. According to the 1915 U.S. Commission on Industrial Relations Report on the Colorado Strike, "The struggle in Colorado was primarily a struggle against arbitrary power, in which the question of wages was secondary, as an immediate issue". The strike was marred by both targeted and indiscriminate attacks from both strikers and individuals hired by CF&I to defend its property. Fighting was focused in the southern coal-mining counties of Las Animas and Huerfano, where the Colorado and Southern railroad passed through Trinidad and Walsenburg. It followed the 1912 Northern Colorado Coalfield Strikes.

Tensions climaxed at the Ludlow Colony, a tent city occupied by about 1,200 striking coal miners and their families, in the Ludlow Massacre on 20 April 1914 when the Colorado National Guard attacked. In retaliation, armed miners attacked dozens of mines and other targets over the next ten days, killing strikebreakers, destroying property, and engaging in several skirmishes with the National Guard along a 225-mile (362 km) front from Trinidad to Louisville, north of Denver. Violence largely ended following the arrival of federal soldiers in late April 1914, but the strike did not end until December 1914. No concessions were made to the strikers. An estimated 69 to 199 people died during the strike, though the total dead counted in official local government records and contemporary news reports is far lower. The labor dispute was the bloodiest in the United States and Colorado historian William J. Convery called it the "bloodiest civil insurrection in American history since the Civil War". The Colorado Coalfield War is notable for the number of company-aligned dead in a period when strikebreaking violence typically saw fatalities exclusively among strikers, and contributed to the rapid escalation of violence in the later Battle of Blair Mountain.

== Background ==
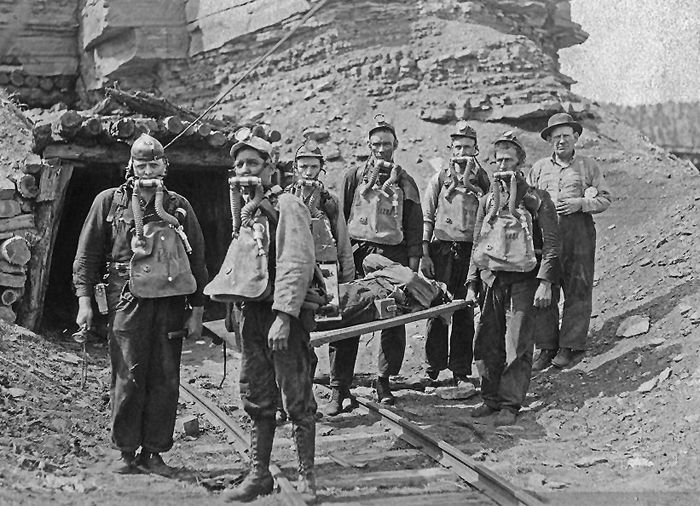
Miners in Primero recover a casualty from the 31 January 1910 explosion that killed 75 at the CF&I mine.

In 1903, the Colorado Fuel and Iron Company was taken over from its founder, John C. Osgood, by a group of Colorado-based board members and investors with the support of John D. Rockefeller. Osgood was the wealthiest Coloradan at the time, and founded the Victor-American Fuel Company later that year.

Colorado Fuel and Iron's treatment of its workers worsened after its sale to John D. Rockefeller, who gave his portion of the company to his son John D. Rockefeller Jr. as a birthday gift. The company already had a history of buying political figures and banking "graft", but Lamont Montgomery Bowers, who was hired to "untangle the mess", caused additional issues. Bowers, made chairman of the CF&I board in 1907, admitted that the company had "mighty power in the entire state." Under his leadership, every employee—regardless of citizenship status—as well as company mules were registered to vote. The workers were coerced to vote for the company's interests. He cut the Sociological Department and embraced the idea of a hands-off approach to employee management. (Note: While having an altruistic appearance, the CF&I Sociological Department has been reevaluated by historians as an expression of "corporate paternalism" rather than for the benefit of the miners. For example, the department would subsidize the construction of churches, but with near-exclusive preference for mainline Protestantism and Catholicism over less-controllable independent congregations. Miners disliked the company-run congregations, often preferring to attend the same denomination in nearby non-company towns. The education of children in mining towns was also the duty of the Sociological Department) This caused rampant dishonesty in middle management, to the detriment of the mine workers. Despite the reduction of the Sociological Department's involvement in some aspects of employees' lives, there was still enforcement of certain societal regulations. A later federal report would claim CF&I was censoring literature in the company towns, prohibiting "socialist" texts as well as books described by a CF&I spokesman as containing "erroneous ideas," including Charles Darwin's On the Origin of Species.

Miners were generally paid according to tonnage of coal produced, while so-called "dead work", such as shoring up unstable roofs, was often unpaid. The tonnage system drove many poor and ambitious colliers to gamble with their lives by neglecting precautions and taking on risk, with consequences that were often fatal. CF&I was accused by both miners and federal investigators of occasionally not assigning checkweighmen "in order that the miners might be cheated of part of their earnings." (Note: In 1914, Victor-American's John C. Osgood testified that up to 25 percent of a miner's payroll was spent at shops in company towns. These shops often turned a profit of roughly 20 percent for the mining companies.)

Between 1884 and 1912, Colorado's fatality rate among miners was more than double the national average, with 6.81 miners killed for every 1,000 workers (against a national average of 3.12). In the decade preceding the 1913–1914 Strike, CF&I mines had been involved in several major accidents. These included the 31 January 1910 explosion that killed 75 at the Primero Mine and the Starkville Mine explosion that killed 56 on 8 October of that year. Both of these accidents took place in Las Animas County, part of what became the strike zone and where the Ludlow Colony was established. These incidents raised the fatality rate in Colorado to above 10 deaths per 1,000 workers, three times the national average. Due to jury tampering by the companies, very few accident lawsuits were launched; between 1895 and 1915, no personal injury lawsuits were launched against coal mining companies in Huerfano County. In the case of the 1910 Primero accident, a coroner's report issued after five days absolved CF&I of any civil or criminal responsibility. Additionally, a high rate of disease afflicted the minefields, with at least 151 inhabitants of CF&I company towns contracting typhoid in the year preceding the 1913–1914 strike.

In April 1912, the Northern Colorado Coalfield Strikes slowly ended following several years of striking and negotiations. This strike had seen internal tensions between different districts of UMWA miners, as some members of neighboring districts were recruited as strikebreakers, leading some members of the Industrial Workers of the World, through their publication Industrial Worker, to claim "autonomous district organization is on par with scabbery." In its aftermath, the National Guard prepared for additional violence by constructing fortifications, including the large cobblestone Golden Armory in June 1913.

Since the Colorado Labor Wars of 1903–1904, CF&I had spent $20,000 annually (equivalent to $716,667 in 2025) on private detectives and security to monitor and infiltrate unions. Baldwin-Felts spy Charles Lively was among the most successful in his infiltration, rising to the position of vice-president of the UMWA local. Bowers viewed these private investigators as “grafters” and sought to cut ties with them. However, local CF&I fuel manager E. H. Weitzel retained Pinkerton detectives in the Southern Colorado coalfields to monitor the collective organizing of miners in the region. Federal investigators would later cite these armed guards and spies, as well at their utilization of "the whole machine of the law" in the "persecution of organizers and union members," as among the primary reasons for strikers taking arms against CF&I.

The Copper County Strike of copper workers in Calumet, Michigan, for nine months from 1913 to 1914, ran concurrently with the Colorado strike, and both strikers and Guardsmen were aware of the events in Michigan through coverage in Collier's and other nationally circulating publications.

== Beginning of the strike ==
Map illustrating the main locations of striking miners' colonies and towns during the Colorado Coalfield War, 1913–1914

The Coalfield Strikes of 1913–1914 began in the late summer of 1913 when the United Mine Workers of America organized its regional District 15, led by John McLennan, to represent Southern Coloradan coal field workers and put forward demands to Colorado Fuel and Iron. Demands that emphasized enforcement of new regulatory laws were not met. Among the demands unheeded was the enforcement of a mine-safety bill passed in 1913 which required better ventilation in the mines, but which had no enforcement provision. On 16 September 1913, miners with and union members with District 15 adopted demands for a seven-step improvement to the wage scale of miners and company recognition of the UMWA.

In December 1912, the UMWA had sent 21 "recruiting teams" to the Southern Colorado coalfields. These recruiting teams generally consisted of two union men: one who would embed himself among the miners and another who would find employment with the local management. Working in tandem, each pairing would locate miners who were opposed to unionization and report them to the company as union sympathizers—an offense that generally resulted in contract termination—in order to covertly replace them with genuine union members. It is possible that up to 3,000 UMWA members were introduced to the coalfields in such a manner.

In Southern Colorado, an expanded strike began on 23 September 1913 during a rainstorm. That day, the strike peaked with up to 20,000 miners and family members being evicted from company housing. Prior to the eviction, there had been plans to move them all into union supplied tents. Eight tent colonies were supposed to have been constructed with materials from the UMWA in anticipation such an eventuality, but most of the tents arrived late, leading some families to resort to using furniture as improvised shelters. Despite internal statistics at CF&I that suggested only 10 percent of miners were union-members, Rockefeller was informed soon after the strike began that between 40 and 60 percent of the miners in the strike zone had left work, which became roughly 80.5 percent—7,660 men—by the 24th.

Jesse F. Welborn, the president of CF&I, announced he would not meet with the strikers and that the confrontation “would be a strike to the finish.” The day the strike was declared, Mother Jones led a march on the Trinidad town hall, giving a brief speech outside and inside:

"Rise up and strike! If you are too cowardly, there are enough women in this country to come in here and beat the hell out of you."

— Mother Jones, Speech at Trinidad City Hall, 23 September 1913.

During this initial stage of the strike, Governor Ammons met several times with Welborn, Osgood, and David W. Brown—representing CF&I, Victor-American, and the Rocky Mountain Fuel Company respectively. Ammons intended to facilitate a summit between these corporate leaders to several of the union heads so that the strike might end quickly. However, following belligerent statements on both sides, such a conference never transpired.

Most sheriffs and deputy sheriffs in the area were affiliated in some fashion with CF&I and the other major mining companies and acted as an initial force against the strikers. Their numbers were bolstered as the strike began by recruiting of new sheriffs and deputies, including Karl Linderfelt, who later led the militia. Many of those deputized, and at least 66 in two days, were from Texas, while others were from New Mexico.

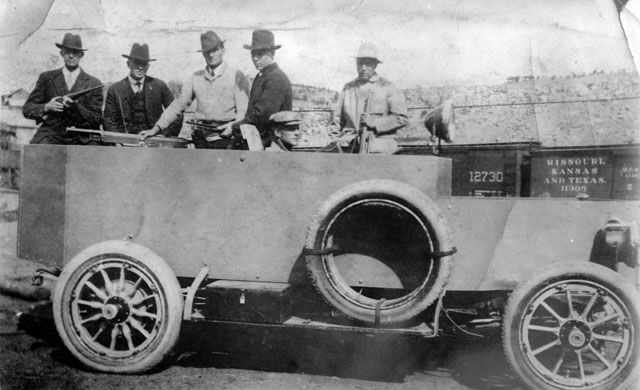
Baldwin-Felts detectives with M1895 machine gun aboard Death Special.

General John Chase had been the leader of the National Guard units charged with the suppression of the 1903–1904 Cripple Creek Strike and was disposed positively towards the mine guards and hired detectives that would eventually supplement his ranks. CF&I vehicles and other infrastructure were regularly employed by the Guard for the duration of the strike. Chase, in his position at the head of the Colorado National Guard, embraced an aggressive stance against the strikers.

Though there were strikes in places such as Walsenburg and Trinidad, the largest of the strike colonies was in Ludlow. It had around 200 tents with 1,200 miners. The escalating situation caused Governor Elias Ammons to call in the Colorado National Guard in October 1913, but after six months all but two companies were withdrawn for financial reasons. However, during this six-month period, guardsmen were allowed to leave if their primary livelihood was threatened and many of the guardsmen were "new recruits"—mine guards and strikebreakers in National Guard uniforms.

As was common in mine strikes of the time, the company also brought in strikebreakers and Baldwin-Felts detectives. These detectives had experience from West Virginia strikes in which they had defended themselves from violent strikers. Balwin-Felts detectives George Belcher and Walker Belk had killed UMWA organizer Gerald Liappiat in Trinidad on 16 August 1913, five weeks before the strikes began. (Note: Belcher would later be killed during the strike, most likely by Louis Zancanelli.) The widely reported public killing of Liappiat in what was deemed by a coroner's jury a "justifiable homicide" during a two-sided gunfight had helped inflame tensions in the region.

Further detectives were brought into the state once the strike commenced. Upon arrival, these between 40 and 75 detectives were deputized as county sheriffs. The Baldwin-Felts were also responsible for the recruitment of mine guards meant for service directly under CF&I.

The Baldwin-Felts and CF&I had an armored car nicknamed the Death Special, which was equipped with a machine gun, as well as eight machine guns purchased by CF&I from the Coal Operators' Association of West Virginia—a mining company association. (Note: Members of the Baldwin-Felts are recorded as claiming that at least one of the specific guns brought from West Virginia had previously received Congressional scrutiny for apparent usage aboard a train, where it was said to have been used to fire upon striking miners and their tents during strikes there.) Three additional machine guns reached the strike zone by the end of the conflict, though how these weapons were sourced is uncertain. Death Special was constructed at a CF&I shop in Pueblo for company use against their striking workers and passed on to the militia later in the conflict. Prior to being distributed to the militia, company-employed detectives were accused of firing randomly into and above the miners' colonies from Death Special.

The strikers also armed themselves through private sales, primarily through local private dealers. Colorado gun dealers are recorded as having sold to both sides in the various calibers that were commercially popular at the time—especially .45-70 and .22 Long Rifle. Dealers in Walsenburg and Pueblo also sold explosives to both sides of the conflict, though the investigating congressional committee noted they did "not believe a majority of the people of Colorado indorse [sic] such actions."

== Violence early in the strike ==
=== September 1913 ===
On 24 September, a marshal employed by CF&I named Robert Lee was attempting the arrest of four strikers accused of vandalism when he was ambushed and killed at Segundo. Another lawman later testified that Lee had been particularly hated by the strikers for his insults against their wives.

=== October 1913 ===
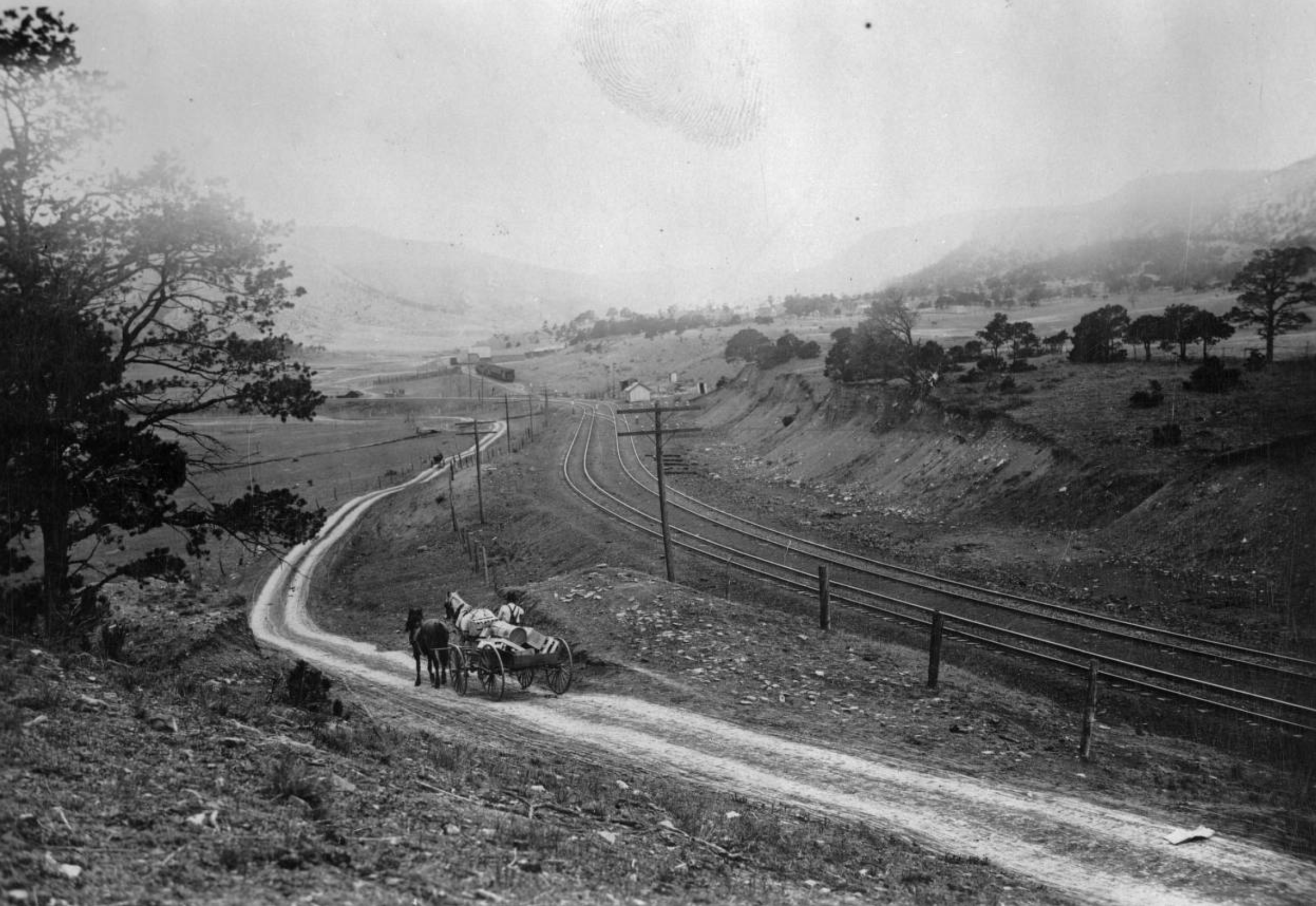
View west from Water Tank Hill above Ludlow into Berwind Canyon towards Berwind and Tabasco. Site of the 24 October 1913 fighting.

A Colorado and Southern (C&S) route that connected the Front Range and passed near the Ludlow Colony began to be used as a firing position to harass strikers on 8 October 1913, resulting in no immediate casualties.

At roughly 1:30 pm on 9 October 1913, a striking miner who had been hired as a rancher, Mark Powell, was herding cattle near patrolling CF&I mine guards. The guards were passing near a C&S train bridge. A sudden burst of gunfire erupted, sending the guards to cover and killing Powell. His death came the same day four pieces of artillery arrived in the strike zone with a National Guard company. News of the incident resulted in a run on guns in Trinidad.

A mine in Dawson, New Mexico collapsed on 22 October, killing 263 miners. The disaster was at the time the worst mining disaster in the Western United States. It served to further raise ire amongst the miners and added perceived legitimacy to the UMWA strike just north of the Colorado–New Mexico border.

On 24 October, a day after Governor Ammons left the strike zone, Walsenburg Sheriff Jeff Farr recruited 55 deputies. Later that day, while escorting a set of wagons belonging to a non-striking family on Seventh Street, the deputies fired into a hostile crowd, killing three foreign miners. Fearing a military response, an armed group of Greek strikers were sent by John Lawson to prevent troops from arriving in the area by the C&S train, and they fired with little effect on it as it passed through. Lieutenant Linderfelt, one of the first deputized into the militia, then led a group of 20 militiamen to hold a section house along the railway a half-mile south of Ludlow when at 3 pm they came under fire from strikers in elevated positions on the ridges. John Nimmo, a mine guard and National Guardsman from Denver, was killed early in the engagement. A relief force of 40 militia and Baldwin-Felts arrived with a machine gun after the fighting had shifted to the multiple camps in nearby Berwind Canyon. This, coupled with a snowstorm, broke up the battle.

The National Guard was mobilized on 28 October and began field operations the next day. The next day, several buildings were set on fire in Aguilar, including a post office and a mine. The Guard later arrested several strikers in relation to this arson and handed them over to the U.S. Marshal Service.

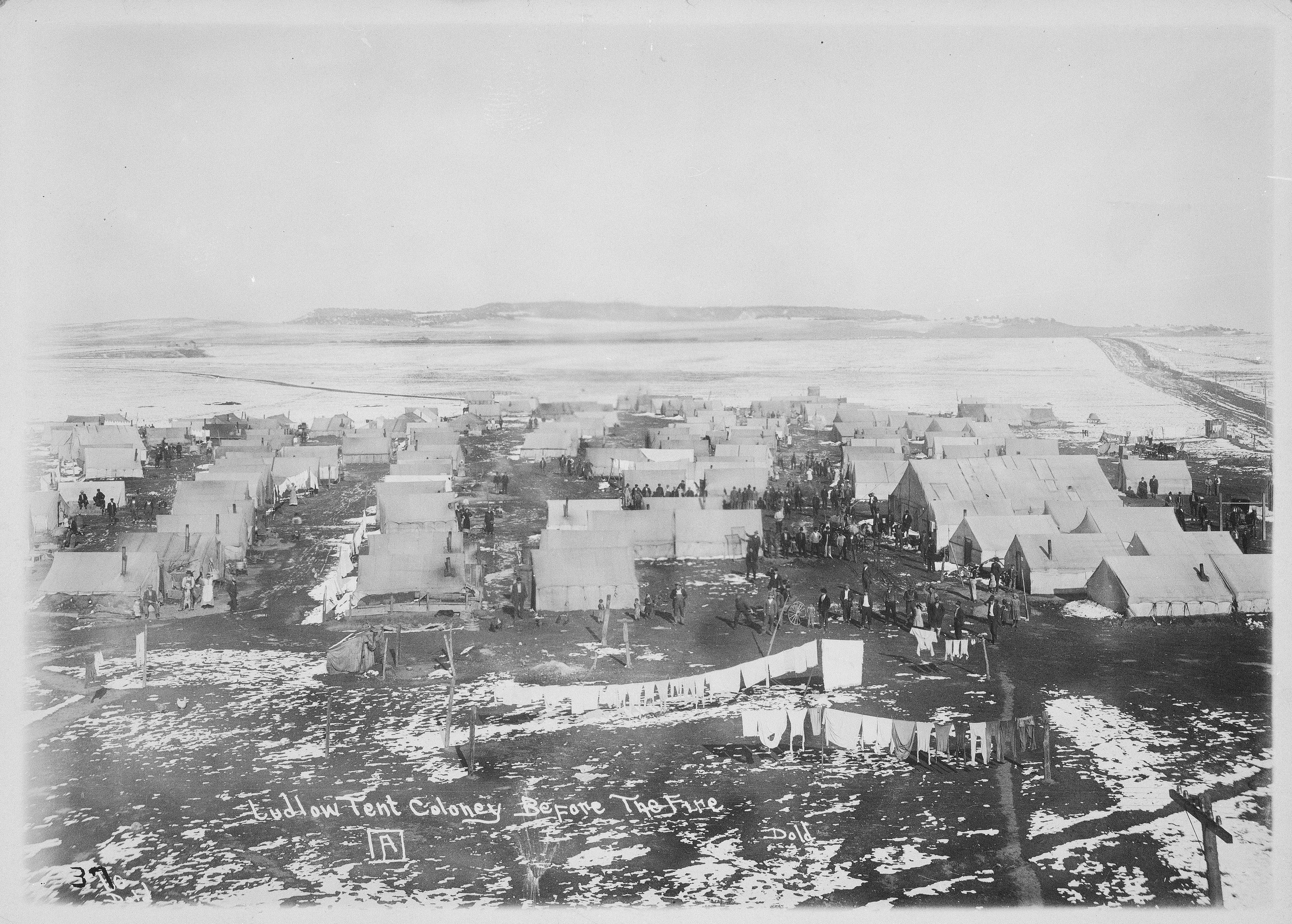
The Ludlow Colony as set up following the September 1913 eviction of strikers, pictured in early 1914.

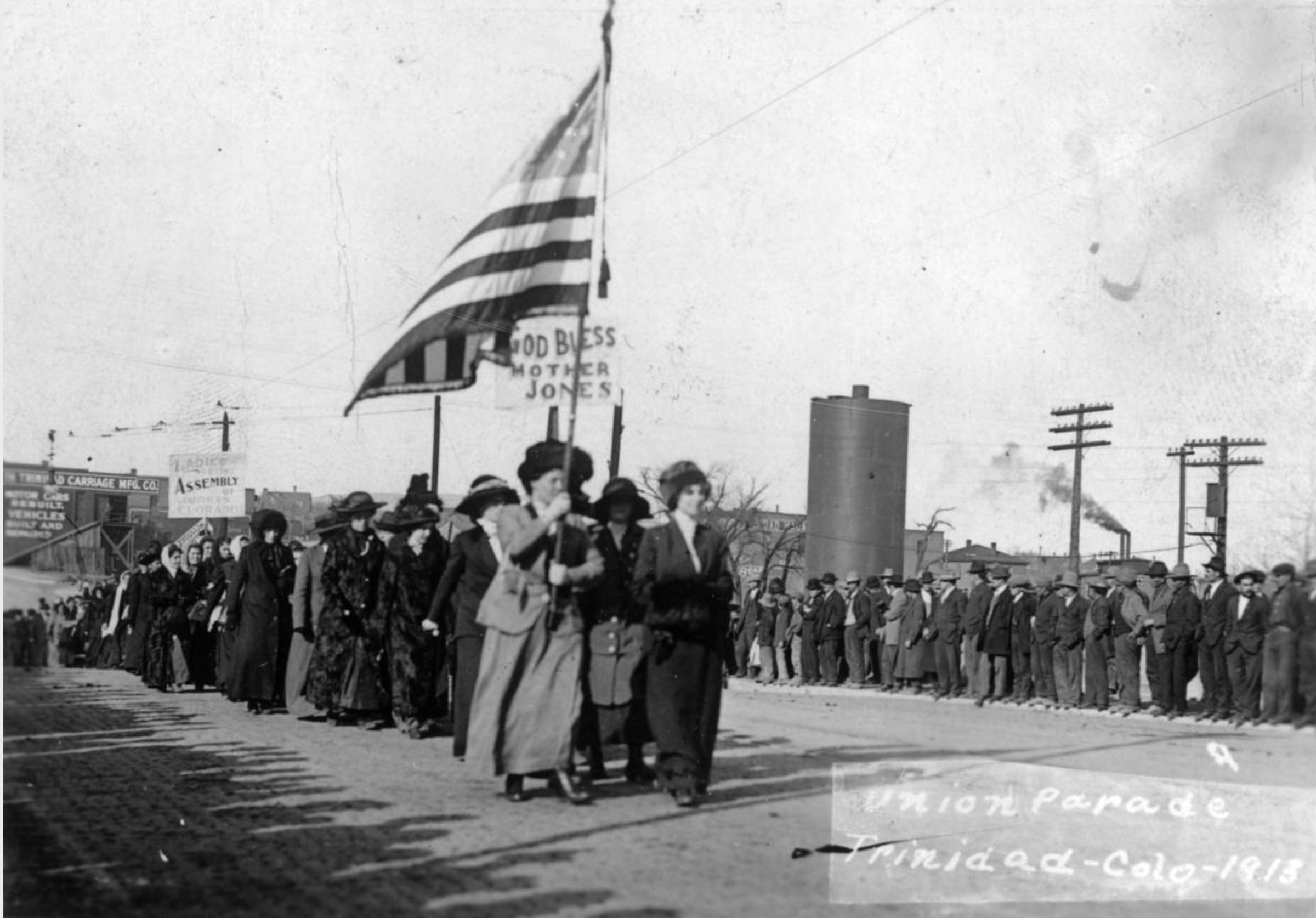
Members of the Ladies Voting Assembly of Southern Colorado march in Trinidad to support Mother Jones, who was repeatedly jailed during this time.

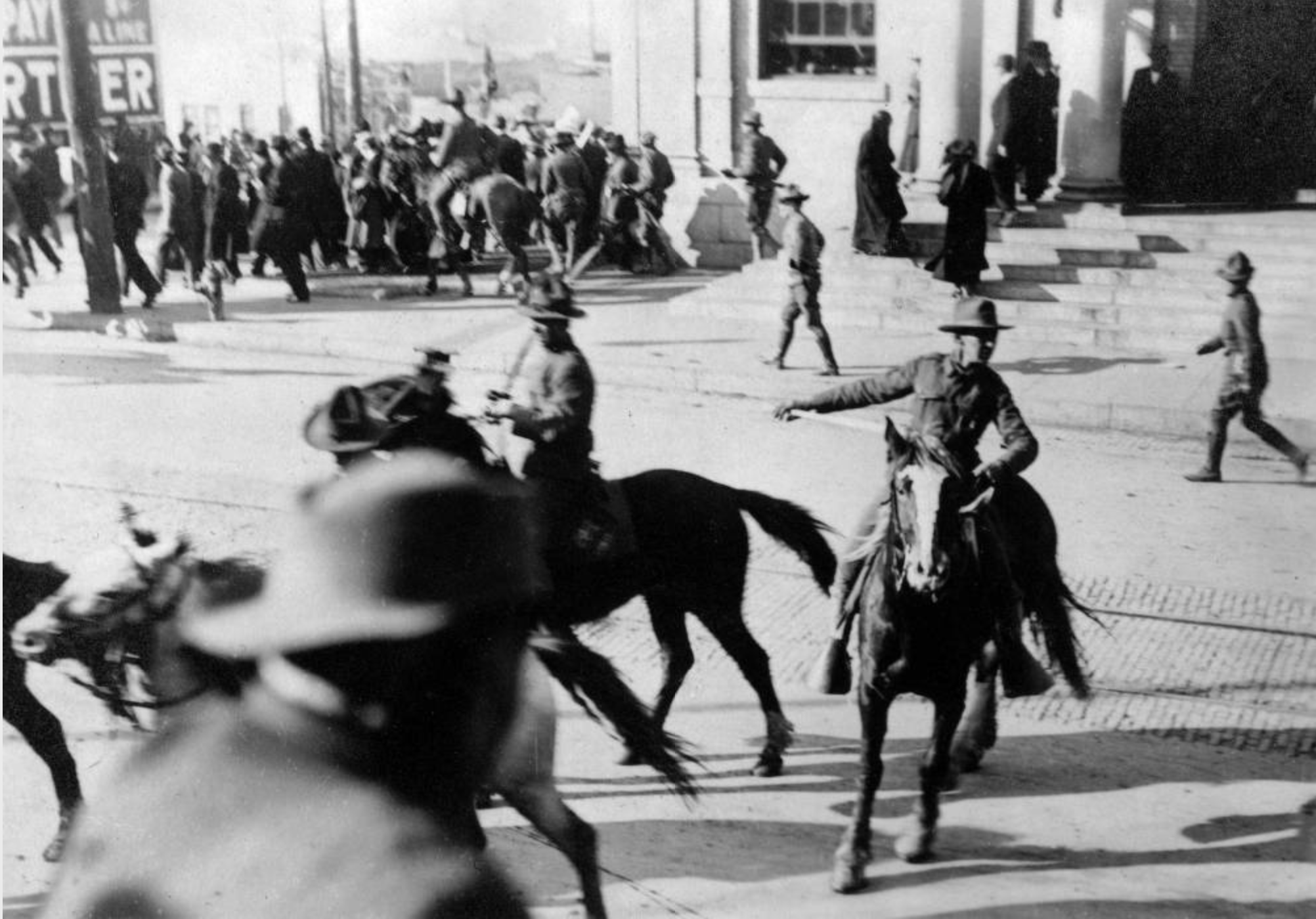
Mounted Colorado National Guardsmen break up a protest seeking to secure Mother Jones's release in January 1914.

=== November 1913 ===
After an agreement between General Chase and John Lawson, on 1 November the National Guard marched between the mines and tent colonies to effect a disarmament on both sides. The military report of the incident records a warm reception by the strikers, especially those at Ludlow who created a band to herald the arrival of soldiers, though the National Guard only received a reported 20–30 weapons, including a toy gun.

On the morning of 8 November, at the Oakview Mine, in the La Veta Pass and near the pro-union town of the same name, pro-union men began harassing "scabs"–non-striking and strikebreaking miners. William Gambling rejected offers to join the union on his way to the local dentist and, returning in a mail carrier's car with three CF&I company men, was ambushed. Gambling was the only survivor. The militia rounded up several men after finding a pile of repeating rifles. Also that morning, strikebreaker Pedro Armijo was being escorted through a crowd of strike-supporters when he was shot in the head. The bullet wounded striker Michele Guerriero, who lost an eye and was arrested by the militia, who held him for three months on suspicion of knowing who fired the bullet. Later that day, the National Guard reported that strikers assaulted Herbert Smith, a clerk working at the McLaughlin Mine. The Military Commission held three or four men in relation to the Smith attack before releasing them to civil authorities.

The National Guard reported that on 18 November the Piedmont home of Domenik Peffello, a miner who had quit the strike, was dynamited. Peffello likely lost his home after returning to it upon abandoning the Piedmont tent colony.

Baldwin-Felts detective George Belcher was killed by Italian striker Louis Zancanelli in Trinidad on 22 November in what the National Guard's official report deemed an assassination. Zancanelli was sentenced to life imprisonment for the murder, though this conviction was overturned in 1917 when the trial was determined to have been improperly judged.

=== December 1913 ===
Mine guard Robert McMillen was shot and killed at Delagua, a mine owned by Colorado's second-largest coal company, Victor-American Fuel Company, and which had been one of the first mines to go on strike, on 2 December.Some historians dispute this death being part of the coalfield war as the December 3rd, 1913 edition of the Rocky Mountain News reports a Robert 'McCullen', mine guard at Delagua, being shot on this day by another mine guard during a domestic dispute at his home. https://www.coloradohistoricnewspapers.org/?a=d&d=RMD19131203-01.2.76

On 17 December, the National Guard, under orders from Gov. Ammons from 1 December, allowed for the strikebreakers to resume entering the strike zone following a brief moratorium on any workers other than those already present in Southern Colorado working.

=== January 1914 ===
The return of Mother Jones to Trinidad on 11 January resulted in considerable response. She was arrested shortly thereafter by the National Guard on the orders of Ammons and taken to Mt. San Rafael Hospital. She was held repeatedly over the next nine months. Strikers attempted to liberate Jones from her first detention on the 21st by marching on the hospital but failed to secure her release after being repulsed by mounted National Guardsmen. She would remain held in Mt. San Rafael for nine weeks.

On 27 January, the National Guard reported discovering an unexploded bomb near their camp at Walsenburg, estimating that it could have killed many of the troops stationed there. The Guard used this incident, which resulted in new arrests, as evidence of striker aggression towards the military in the region.

The same day, the United States House Committee on Mines and Mining opened an investigation on both the Northern and Southern Colorado Coalfield strikes, as well as the Calumet strike. The report pertaining to the Southern Colorado strike was released on 2 March 1915. The UMWA would legally challenge the National Guard imprisonment of four strikers in Las Animas County on habeas corpus grounds, while the National Guard stated the imprisonments were permitted by previous court rulings and the Posse Comitatus Act. The court sided with the National Guard on 29 January.

== Events before Ludlow ==
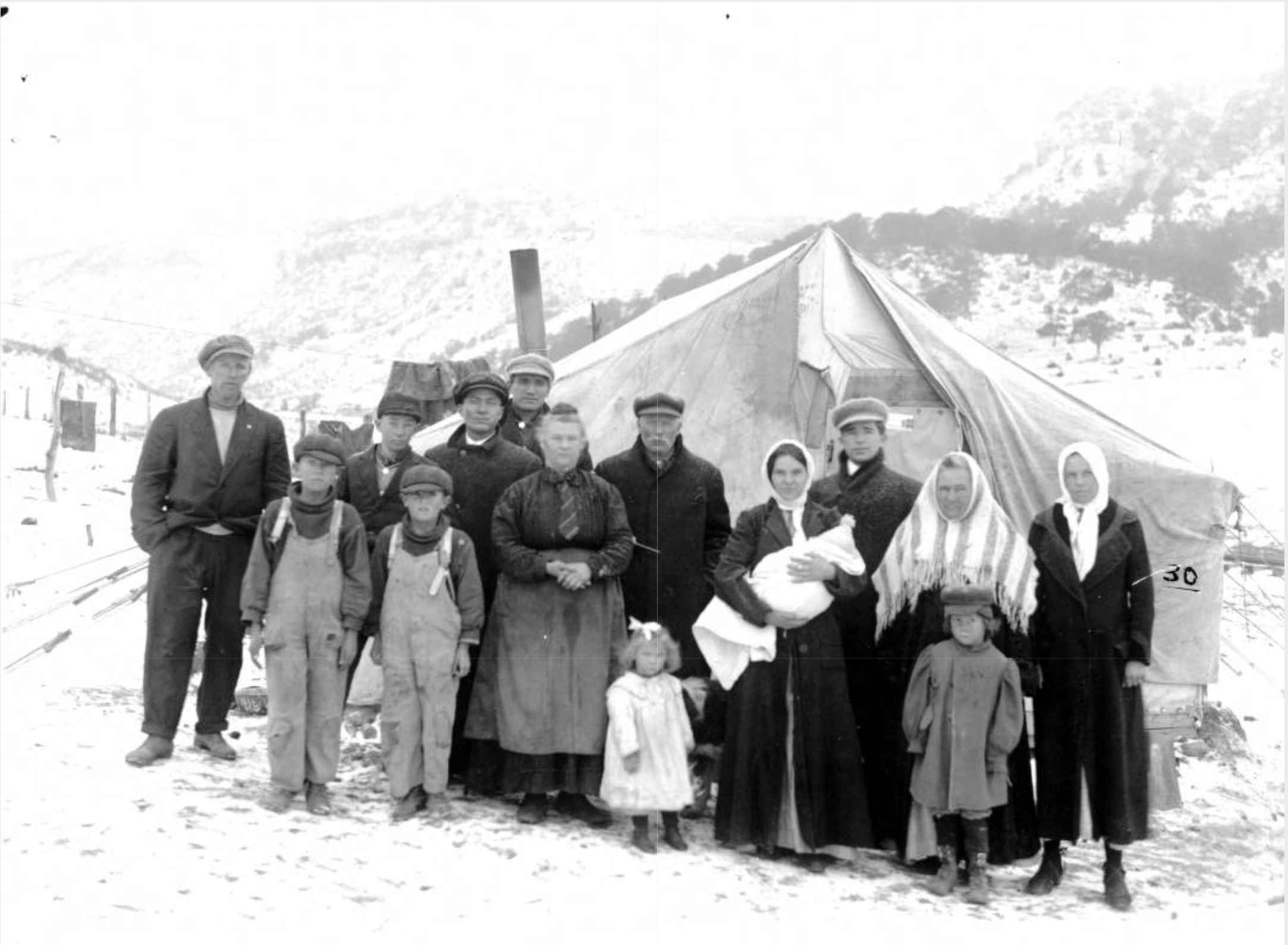
UMWA strikers at the Forbes Colony, 1914. After the 10 March destruction of the colony, Joseph Zanetell (light cap, in front of chimney) would lose two newborn twins to exposure. (Note: The Zanetell family's furnishings from the Forbes Colony survive on permanent display in the Colorado History Museum.)

Due to the influence of the Colorado National Guard and Greek Union leaders, such as Louis Tikas in Ludlow Colony, the strike had become relatively peaceful by the beginning of 1914. The strikers and the Guardsmen sat opposite each other at Ludlow, with brown tents for the soldiers appearing on the opposite side of the track from the white ones belonging to the colonists starting in November 1913.

There was still tension, though, and on 14 January Linderfelt was accused of hitting Tikas while at Ludlow in retaliation for Tikas not divulging the whereabouts of a boy related to an incident in which Linderfelt and his men ran into barbed wire on a path. The official report by the National Guard detachment commander at Aguilar to General Chase on 18 January denied the claim, as did a telegram to Governor Ammons sent personally from Linderfelt. Lawson, however, asserted in a telegram to Ammons that Linderfelt had used the "vilest of language" towards the boy in question and had said to the strikers "I am Jesus Christ, and my men on horses are Jesus Christs, and we must be obeyed." Lawson also suggested Linderfelt had acted with the intention of provoking the strikers to violence.

On 8 March 1914 the body of a strikebreaker, Neil Smith, was found on the train tracks near the Forbes tent colony, located near the then-emptied Rocky Mountain Fuel Company town of the same name, an incident that occurred as a congressional committee was touring the area. The National Guard claimed that the colony harbored the murderers and was "so established that no workmen [could] leave the camp at Forbes without passing along or through" the colony. In retaliation, the Guard destroyed the colony on 10 March, burning it to the ground while most inhabitants were away and arresting all 16 men living in the tents, an action that indirectly resulted in the deaths of two newborn children.

Mother Jones, who had already been arrested twice by the militia, again traveled south on 22 March in an effort to reach Trinidad. Arriving in Walsenburg by train, the militia arrested her and held her in a Huerfano County jail. At 76 years old, she was held for 26 days in the subterranean cell. Pro-union publications used this detention as a rallying call, exaggerating the squalid qualities of the cell and claiming she was an even older, more fragile woman than she was.

== Battle and Massacre at Ludlow ==
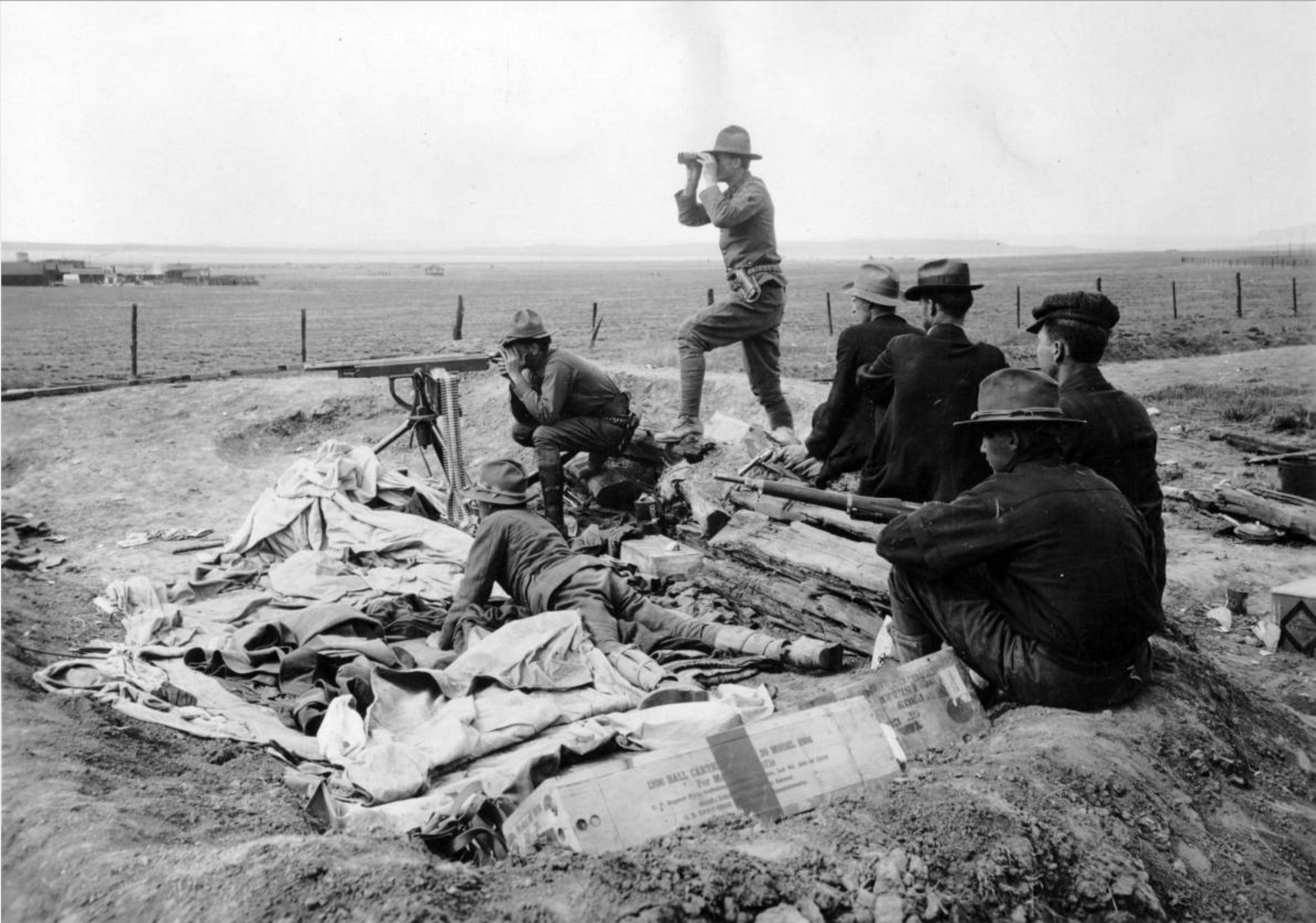
National Guardsmen with a M1895 machine gun on Water Tank Hill, an elevated position that overlooked the Ludlow tent colony, 1914.

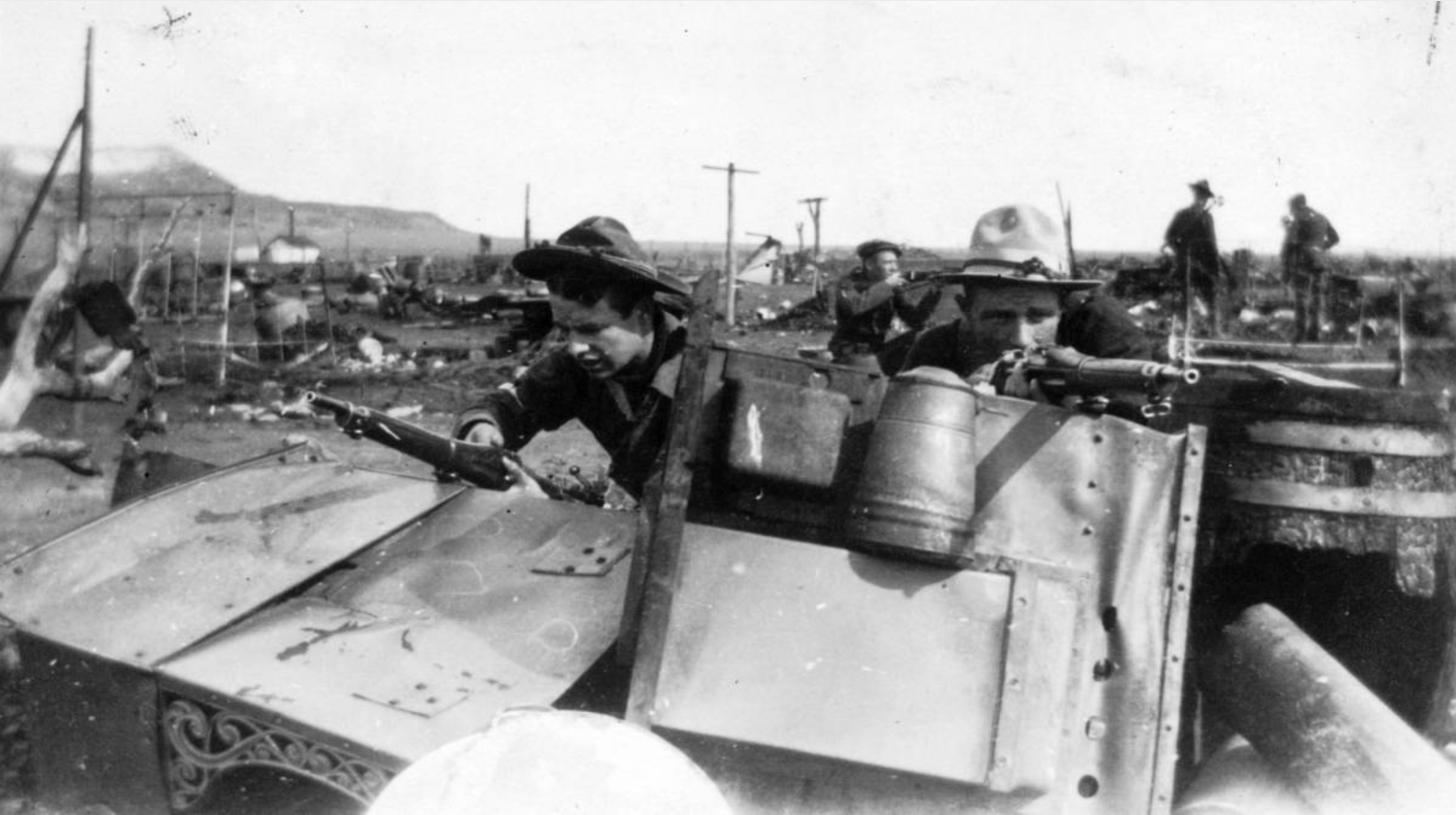
Guardsmen posing as though they are taking cover shortly following the Ludlow Massacre, 20 April 1914.

On the morning of April 20, 1914, the day after the Eastern Orthodox Church's Easter Sunday and after months of increased tension between the armed factions, the Ludlow Massacre occurred. The withdrawal of the majority of the National Guard had left only two companies of troops in the strike area, with these soldiers spread across several encampments at Berwind, Ludlow, and Cedar Hill. On Sunday, 19 April, it was reported that a group of union-aligned women playing baseball at Ludlow exchanged insults with National Guardsmen, one of whom is reported as saying to the women, "Go ahead, have your good time to-day, and to-morrow we will get your roast." On the morning of 20 April, Tikas was summoned by soldiers claiming a woman sought to speak to her husband, a supposed resident of the Ludlow Colony. Tikas refused the initial invitation to meet in the soldiers' tent. Major Patrick Hamrock, the Irish-born leader of the "Rocky Mountain Sharpshooters" and a veteran of the Wounded Knee Massacre, persuaded Tikas to meet at the Ludlow train stop. Tikas told his agitated fellow Greek strikers to remain calm. (Note: While the Greek and Slavic miners had a major impact on the events at Ludlow and elsewhere during the strike, a significant proportion of the strikers and residents in the mining colonies were of English and Welsh heritage, the latter including Mary T. O'Neal, reflecting both communities' lengthy involvement in Colorado mining operations. Additionally, among the strikers at Ludlow in particular, there were also Black families.)

Sensing the militia's intent to act that day after seeing machine guns placed above the colony and choosing to disobey Tikas, strikers took cover in hastily constructed fire positions. Accounts of who fired the first shot differ, but fighting began or escalated after the militia at Ludlow detonated warning charges to notify Linderfelt's troops stationed at Berwind Canyon and another detachment at Cedar Hill. In total, some 177 militia and soldiers participated in the fighting.

By 9:30 am, the gunfire had begun to reach its peak intensity. Families of the strikers sought shelter in cellars beneath their tents as the fighting raged through the morning and until past 5 pm. National Guardsmen fired a machine gun from Water Tank Hill, an elevated position above the colony that had served as an observation post for much of strike. A twelve year old, Frank Snyder, left his shelter and was hit by a bullet that removed much of his head, killing him instantly. National Guardsman Pvt. Martin was fatally shot in the neck. M. G. Low, a pumpman for the Colorado & Southern train that passed through the town, witnessed the fighting and moved a train engine to protect some of those fleeing the battle and directed them towards cover.

At the end of the battle, a fire began and the colony burnt down. Soon after the gunfire ended, Tikas and other strikers were found shot in the back along with those strikers who were killed in the combat. Eleven children and two women were found suffocated by smoke in one of the subterranean cellars. All together, at least 18 of the union side had been killed—including Snyder and those seeking shelter in the cellar—while Martin is the only confirmed casualty from the Guard. Due to the fighting and chaos, Rev. John O. Ferris, Episcopalian minister of Trinity Church in Trinidad and St. Mary's in Aguilar, and a small group of others from the nearby communities were among the few permitted into the still-smoldering tent colony. Ferris and his band would discover the dead in the cellar and extracted them to perform hasty Christian burials. Soon after the discoveries, a Red Cross party would visit and photograph the cellar.

During the 1915 Commission on Industrial Relations Congressional hearings on the massacre, Rockefeller maintained that he was not aware of any animosity among the deputized militia subsidized by CF&I, nor that had he ordered the massacre, despite accusations to the contrary from activists including Margaret Sanger. The national media lambasted Rockefeller, who had prior to the Ludlow Massacre claimed no responsibility for the strike and violence, saying "My conscience will acquit me."

== The "Ten Days War" ==
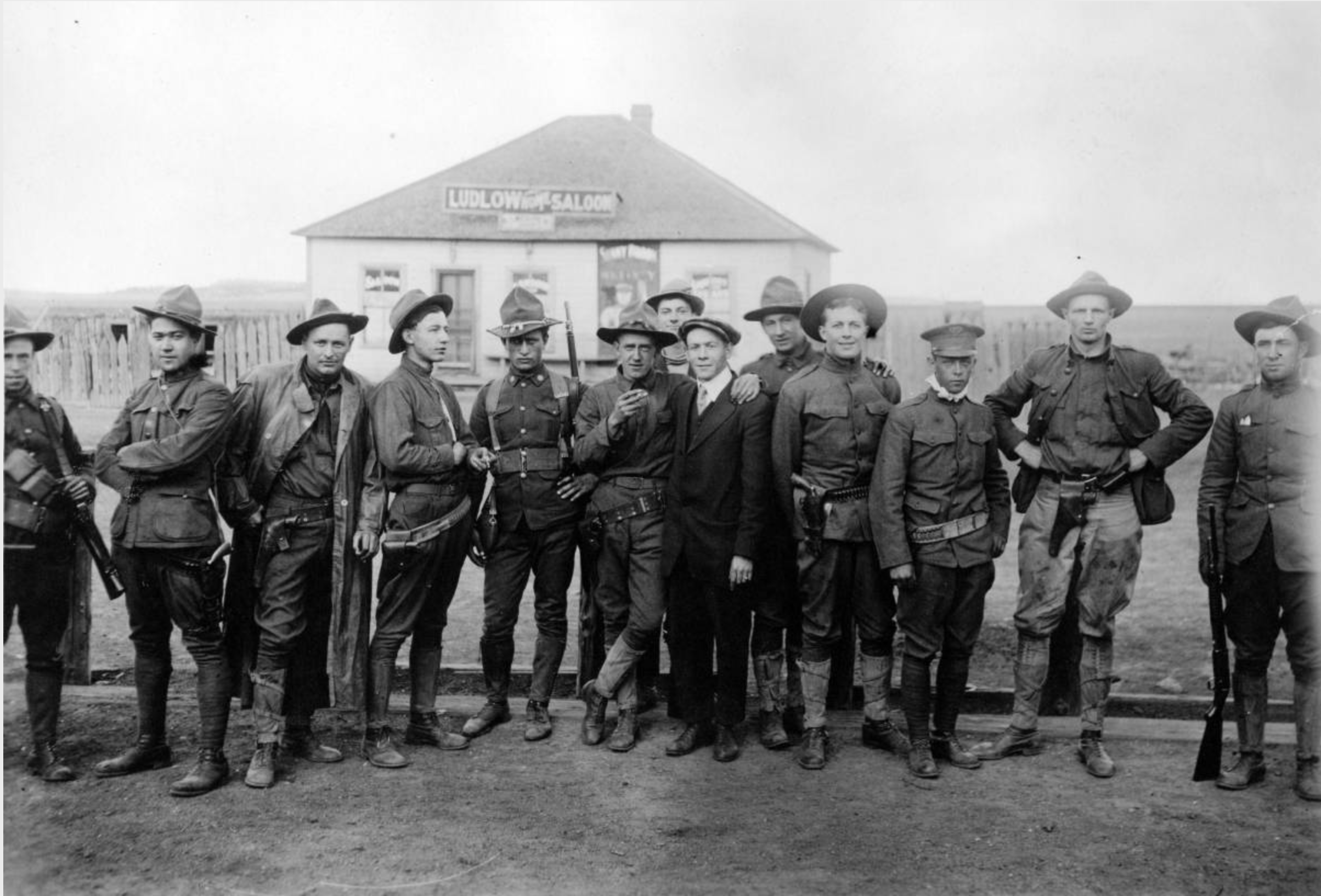
Colorado National Guard troops outside the Ludlow Home Saloon, April 1914.

The news of the massacre soon reached the other tent colonies, including the large group of strikers in Walsenburg. The response was a decentralized expedition throughout Southern and Central Colorado known as the "Ten Days War." At this point the union made an official "Call to Arms", a departure from their previous policy of suppressing violence on the part of the strikers. This led to widespread violence across the Southern Colorado Coalfield area, unlike the small pockets of violence that occurred in canyons in the early days of the strike.

Popular opinion began to side with the miners. Newspapers that had previously sided with the company and Ammons, such as the Daily Camera and Rocky Mountain News, began to sympathize with the strikers and blame "dilly-dallying" on Ammons' part for the deaths. The generally anti-union The New York Times declared the massacre "worse than the order sent to the Light Brigade into the jaws of death, worse in its effect than the Black Hole of Calcutta."

While strikers were divided on how to respond, some sought revenge on non-striking miners, attacking Southwestern Mine Co.'s Empire Mine on Wednesday, 22 April, only to relent after a 21-hour siege. Armed strikebreakers killed two strikers at the loss of the mine's superintendent. A minister named McDonald from nearby Aguilar heard the fighting and rightly feared the strikers intended to kill all those at the Empire Mine. Following the deaths of the two strikers and the discovery of a union organizer willing to discuss terms, McDonald and the Aguilar mayor negotiated a ceasefire that resulted in the strikers withdrawing. However, before the siege broke, national news outlets began erroneously reporting that the families trapped in the Empire Mine were likely suffocated. Three mine guards were killed at Delagua, where four attempts were made by strikers to take the town, and another was killed at Tabasco. These events led the sheriff of Las Animas County to send a telegram to Ammons, declaring that he had been militarily defeated by the miners and requested federal intervention.

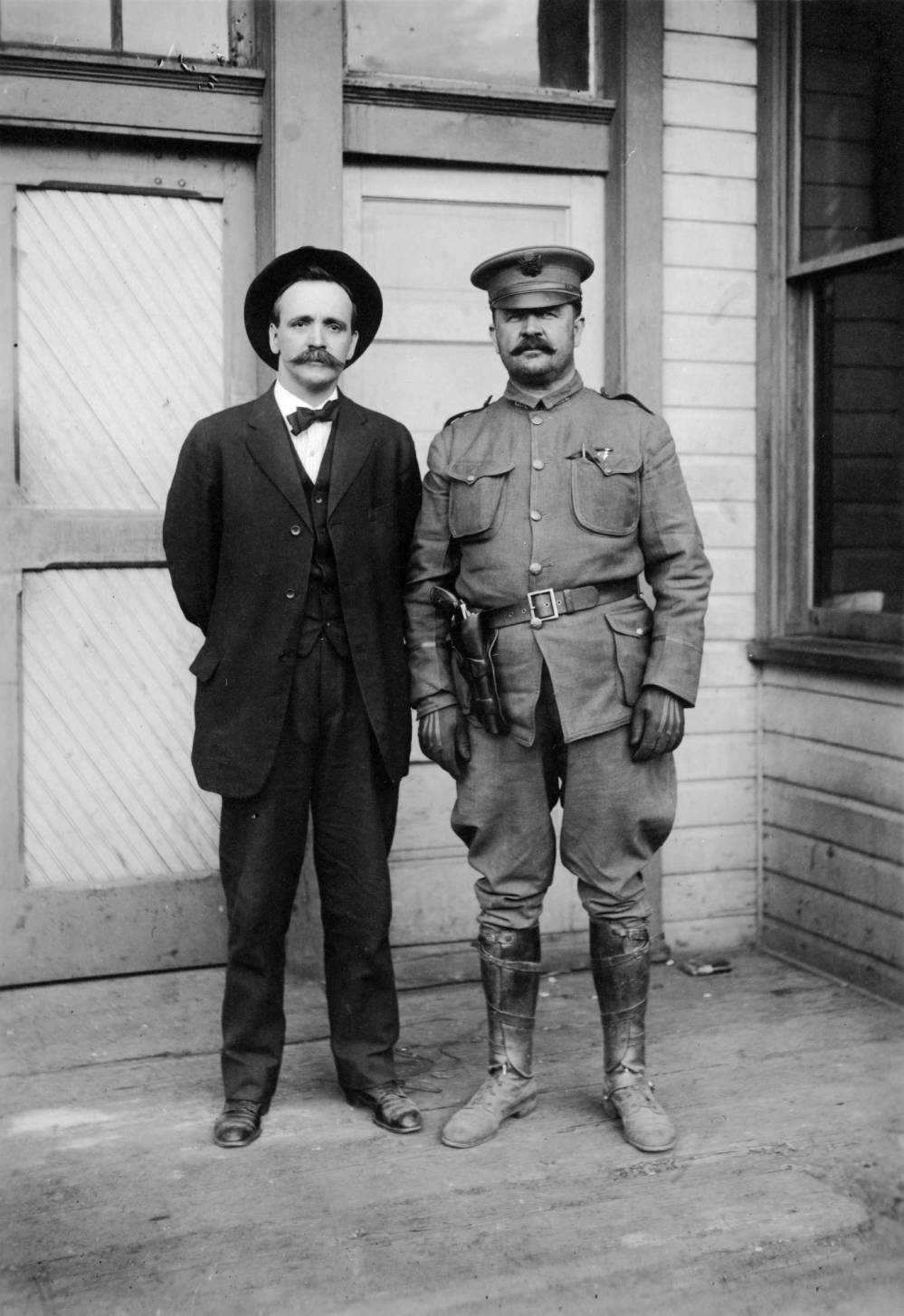
President John McLennan, who led UMWA District 15 at the start of the 1913–1914 strike, with Major Patrick Hamrock following the Ludlow Massacre.

By the evening of the 22nd, Lt. Gov. Fitzgarrald was attempting to secure a ceasefire through UMWA's influential Denver lawyer Horace Hawkins. The following day, John McLennan, the president of UMWA District 15 when the strike was declared, was arrested by militia at the Ludlow train stop on his way from Denver to Trinidad. Hawkins made a ceasefire conditional on McLennan's release, which was secured. Despite union anger at Hawkins for negotiating, they observed the truce along what had become a 175 miles (282 km) front.

At midnight on 22 April, a call went out for all National Guardsmen to head for the strike zone. Chase had claimed prior to Ludlow that he was able to muster 600 men to return to the field at a moment's notice, yet only 362 men reported for duty. Seventy-six soldiers of Troop C—nicknamed "Chase Troop" as two of the general's sons along with other family members were part of the unit—mutinied, as they had been forced to stay in an uncomfortable Guard armory on little pay since returning from their initial deployment to the strike zone. Troop C did not return to coalfields for the duration of the conflict. Two 3 inches (76 mm) field guns and 220 rounds of shrapnel shells were brought with the 23-car train of 242 soldiers going south from Denver on 23 April. Empty carts were attached to the front of the engines to protect against dynamite traps. A group of pro-strikers sought to deliver weapons by car before Chase's troops arrived in Walsenburg and, despite delays, managed to bring guns and ammunition to the strikers before the train full of troops reached the strike zone. The newly arrived troops were then spread out in attempts to bring the region under their control.

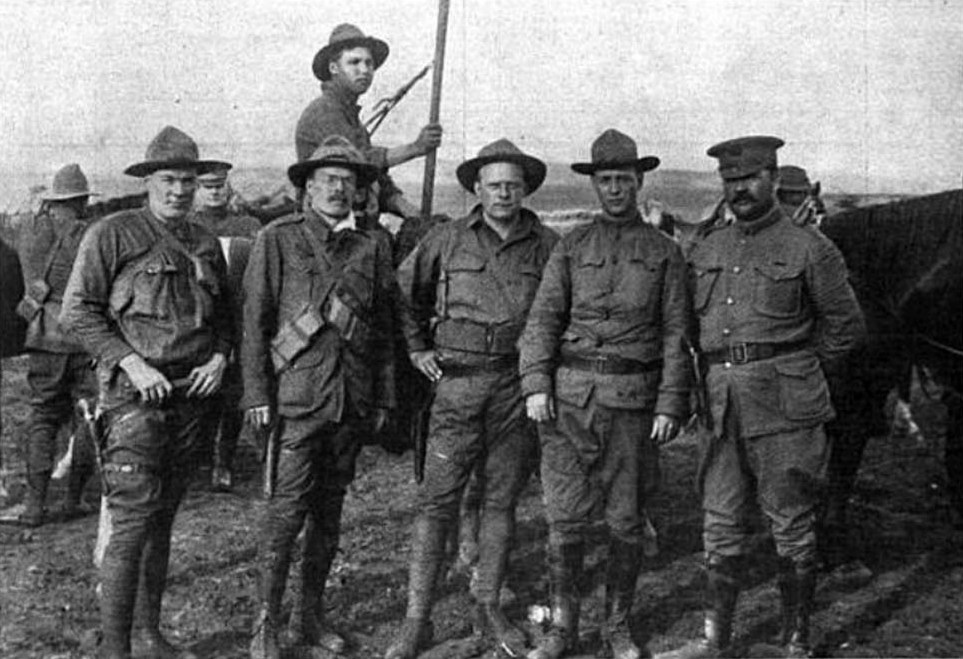
Lt. Karl Linderfelt (center) with two of his brothers (left), Lt. Lawrence, and Major Patrick Hamrock (right), pictured together in 1914.

Through the day on 25 April the Chandler Mine near Cañon City was fired upon, representing the first major breach of the truce declared days before. A force of an estimated one thousand armed strikers launched a coordinated assault on the town, culminating in its capture on 26 April. A non-striking miner was killed and a mine guard seriously injured before National Guardsmen arrived.

Following the renewed violence, the majority of Walsenburg's civilian population fled and sporadic fighting began to overrun the city. Striking Greek miners, dissatisfied with a perceived lack of response from union officials to Ludlow, began organizing guerrilla attacks in the town and mustered 300 strikers to attack the McNally Mine located nearby, killing one. With the return of open hostilities came an increased formalization of military operations on both sides, with the union and militia forces each publishing communiqués reporting casualties and advances while diminishing the claimed successes of their opponents.

A sit-in by over a thousand members of the Women's Peace Association—led by Alma Lafferty, Helen Ring Robinson, and Dora Phelps—paralyzed the Capitol building on 25 April. These women forced a "drawn and haggard" Ammons to send a request for U.S. President Woodrow Wilson to send federal troops to the strike zone. A rally attended by five to six thousand agitated protesters and Colorado senator—and later governor—Charles Thomas stood in front of the Capitol the next day. Despite the presence of dozens of police officers and a rainstorm, the crowds listened peacefully to speakers from the mines as well as the impassioned journalist, propagandist, and former Denver Police Commissioner George Creel. Among the demands of the crowd was the impeachment of Governor Ammons.

The northernmost battle took place on 28 April at the Hecla mine in Louisville. The mine was owned by the Rocky Mountain Fuel Company, which had hired the Baldwin-Felts to help protect its property between Denver and Boulder. During the ten-hour battle, Captain Hildreth Frost led a small contingent of troops that had been among those rotated off the southern front. Several mine guards were seriously injured during the fighting.

=== Battle of Walsenburg, 27–29 April ===
The large 27 April funeral for Tikas in Trinidad strained the militia forces of Colonel Edward Verdeckberg of the National Guard. Verdeckberg, a veteran of the 1903–1904 Cripple Creek Strike and commanding the troops in Walsenburg and Ludlow, was concerned that the funeral might spur rioting in Trinidad and stationed his troops in anticipation of an operation to retake the town. Despite the arrival of Chase's reinforcements bringing the total militia in the southern coalfields to roughly 650, these troops were disallowed from entering Trinidad in accordance to the truce. By this point, Trinidad was thoroughly under control of the strikers and was serving as a central command hub for their armed contingents. At 7 pm, with no reports of significant violence in Trinidad, Chase received word that perhaps hundreds of strikers were attacking the CF&I McNally mine near Walsenburg. Verdeckberg was ordered by Chase to take 60 men to Walsenburg to retake the town on the morning of the 29th.

The National Guard and mine guards from the McNally, Walsen, and Robinson mines fought strikers in the Battle of Walsenburg for control of the town and the hogback which overlooked it. Two strikers were killed on the 28th, including one by friendly fire. Verdeckberg was ordered to hold the town until federal troops arrived then retire back. Several men of this detachment—Lieutenant Scott, Private Wilmouth, and Private Miller—were wounded by gunfire in the afternoon, while Walsenburg-native and medic Major Pliny Lester was killed tending to either Scott or Miller. At 5 pm that day, an unarmed pro-union man on a motorcycle named Henry Lloyd was killed by strikers in an incident of mistaken identity. This and other attacks by the strikers led some in Colorado, particularly outside of Denver, to remain opposed to the strikers, with local papers carrying editorials describing them as "bandit Greek element" supported by "yellow" descriptions of "fictitious battles."

=== Battle of Forbes, 30 April ===
With Verdeckberg's force moved to Walsenburg and negotiations for disarmament once again underway, a group of 100 strikers moved from Trinidad in the night of 29 April, linking up with additional armed anti-militia forces to create a roughly 300-strong force. At 5 am on 30 April, they attacked the Rocky Mountain Fuel Company mine at Forbes, firing weapons into the company-aligned camp and setting buildings alight. The defenders were 18 non-union men who had with them an emplaced machine gun.

Caught unprepared, the superintendent of Forbes used a phone to call for militia forces to be sent from Ludlow to relieve the outnumbered garrison. With Verdeckberg gone, Hamrock answered the call and relayed the superintendent's pleas to Ammons and Chase. Ammons and Chase refused to send militia, believing the Forbes assault a feint to further thin National Guard troops. Strikers were initially repulsed by machine gun fire, but the weapon quickly became jammed, encouraging the attackers to charge into the camp and set most of the structures alight. The attackers were accused of threatening to dynamite the mine entrance, as the unarmed men, women, and children took cover there. None in the cave were killed. The fighting had ceased by 10 am, only hours before federal troops began arriving in the region. In total, nine of the Forbes camp were killed, including four Japanese strikebreakers. At least three strikers were killed by returning fire, including two by the machine gun.

On April 29, thirty-three mules burned alive in one of the company's stables.

=== Conclusion of the "Ten Days War" ===
Part-owner John D. Rockefeller Jr. refused President Wilson's offer of mediation, conditioned upon collective bargaining rights for the strikers, leading Wilson to exert pressure on Ammons and other elected officials in Colorado and threaten to deploy federal troops. The Mexican Revolution meant that any deployment of an already reduced and largely deployed Army would be a risky move. Earlier in April, the Tampico Affair had raised tensions and on 22 April U.S. sailors fought the Mexican military at the Battle of Veracruz. On 28 April, Wilson spoke with Secretary of War Lindley Garrison and ordered the Department of War to begin moving units towards Colorado while preparing to federalize National Guard units. Wilson would invoke the Insurrection Act of 1807 the same day for the first time since 1894 and for only the ninth time since the law's enactment. A total of 1,590 enlisted soldiers and 61 officers of the Army would ultimately be deployed to Colorado. Garrison's stated goal for the federal troops was to "preserve [...] an impartial attitude." Only after this intervention to disarm did the war end.

On 29 April, Lawson issued an order for remaining armed miners to stand down. On 2 May, a proclamation from Garrison was issued, stating that "all persons 'not in the military service of the United States'" were to disarm, although this statement was understood as only disarming the strikers, as Wilson had received assurances from Ammons that the militia was withdrawing and did not need to turn over their weapons. By the end of the Ten Days War, up to 54 people—including non-combatants—had been killed in the post-Ludlow violence.

== Final months of the strike, May–December 1914 ==
As federal troops poured into the striker region, President Wilson began drawing up his own plans for how to conclude the strike. President Wilson instructed Secretary of Labor William B. Wilson to begin negotiations with the union and return with recommendations regarding terms to end the strike. Secretary Wilson worked with mining union heads from across the country to create a plan for concluding the strike; the President felt that federal troops could not be withdrawn until the strikers were back to work. President Wilson received the Secretary of Labor's recommendations several months later and, on 5 September 1914, sent a proposed agreement to the two sides. In November, the United Mine Workers sent two executives, Benjamin F. Morris and Thomas J. Hagerty from the International Executive Board to discuss negotiations with the President's representatives in Indianapolis.

The agreement called for a three-year truce on the stipulation that both sides ceased acts of intimidation and that Colorado's state laws on mining were to be followed, along with contractual alterations.

The President's proposal was brought to a vote by a special convention of miners in Trinidad on 16 September which approved the agreement by a 10:1 margin. President Welborn of CF&I responded on 22 September, stating the company would agree to follow state law but dismissed the remainder of the proposals. Following this, negotiations again broke down. Another also unsuccessful effort by President Wilson to end the strike through diplomacy was launched in late November 1914, but by then the strike had begun to falter.

The strike continued until the union ran out of funds in December 1914. With the strike's end, President Wilson contacted Ammons to determine if federal troops were still needed. Ammons requested the soldiers stay in the southern part of the state but, with no further developments by 1 January 1915, Wilson authorized their withdrawal, which was completed by 10 January. While Wilson succeeded in bringing order to the situation, he had demonstrated support for the labor union and the miners' unconditional surrender to the companies was thus seen as a defeat for Wilson.

== Aftermath ==
"Whenever trouble arose between the workingmen and the employers, whenever the miners began to organize to support or enforce demands for improved conditions, the State, whether in control of a Republican or a Democratic administration, thereupon surrendered its right and duty to enforce the law and maintain order. It turned over this right and duty to the mining companies, themselves, who thereupon imported into the State or organized within the State crews of gunmen and of private detectives and the like, organized them as guards around their property and prepared for open warfare which such actions inevitably precipitated. Many of these special deputies and detectives were excellent men; but this has no more to do with the case than has the fact that many of the riotous striker were also excellent men. The point is that the State recognized in the contestants the right of private war."

— Theodore Roosevelt, Letter to Rep. Edward P. Costigan.

Fatalities during the strike are generally assumed to be under-reported, as Las Animas County coroner's office reports more bodies related to the strike than appear in contemporary news reports. The office recorded 232 violent deaths from the beginning of 1910 to March 1913 with only 30 deaths resulting in a trial, which a later congressional committee would claim demonstrated a pattern of disinterest in recording fatalities associated with the mining companies. Government and private investigations have suggested that this policy of under-reporting deaths in deference to the mining interests continued during the strike's violence. Modern and contemporary estimates of fatalities vary widely, but following the Ludlow Colony's destruction an estimated 30 strikebreakers, National Guard soldiers, and mine guards were killed while a handful of pro-union fighters are reported to have died. Clara Ruth Mozzor—a social worker who would later become the first female Assistant Attorney General of Colorado—wrote for International Socialist Review in 1914 that "waste and ruin, death and misery were the harvest of this war that was waged on helpless people. Mothers with babies at their breasts and babies at their skirts and mothers with babies yet unborn were the targets of this modern warfare." (Note: Mozzor was at her admittance to the bar in 1915 the youngest woman lawyer in Colorado and in 1917 became the first woman to serve as Assistant Attorney General of any U.S. state.)

Six mines and several company towns, including the abandoned Forbes, were damaged or destroyed. The Associated Press estimated the financial cost of the strike at $18 million (equivalent to $578,571,429 in 2025). CF&I lost $1.6 million with $5.6 million still on hand, while the UMWA spent $870,000. By 1915, CF&I mines had reached 70 percent of their pre-strike outputs. Pro-union publications lamented the failure to secure immediate significant structural change in the relationship between miners and the CF&I and criticized the Guard and militia's response and actions at Ludlow.

Major Patrick Hamrock and Lieutenant Karl Linderfelt were tried in separate courts-martial from the rest of the National Guard and militia involved in the suppression of the strike, as they faced additional charges of assault with a deadly weapon in relation to the deaths of strikers in custody at Ludlow, including Tikas. Hamrock was charged on 13 May 1914 with arson, manslaughter, and murder, for all of which he pleaded not guilty. Linderfelt admitted to striking Tikas with his Springfield rifle. The military court found Linderfelt guilty of the assault on Tikas, "but attach[ed] no criminality" to his actions.

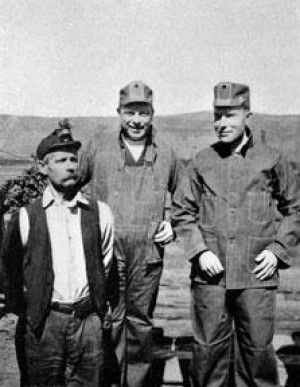
Rockefeller Jr. (right) and Mackenzie King (center) with a miner at the Valdez Mine during their 1915 tour of CF&I holdings.

In the weeks following the federal intervention, the district attorney of Las Animas County opted against trying any miners with murder for the attack on Forbes that occurred during Ten Days War unless "furnished with a list of the militiamen and mine guards who took part in the battle of Ludlow, with a view of prosecuting them on charges of murder and arson." In a Trinidad court, John Lawson was found guilty of murdering Nimmo by Judge Granby Hillyer in 1915 and sentenced to life imprisonment. The UMWA maintained Lawson's innocence, and his conviction was overturned by the Colorado Supreme Court in 1917. Of the 408 strikers charged with a crime—many with murder—there were four convictions. All four were overturned on technicalities. Four men charged in relation to Major Lester's death were acquitted following their trial being moved from Huerfano County to Castle Rock in Douglas County.

Rockefeller hired future Canadian prime minister Mackenzie King in June 1914 to help create a system by which miners could have internal representation within CF&I. Rockefeller also hired Ivy Lee, an early practitioner and pioneer of public relations, and met with Mother Jones. (Note: Rockefeller had initially been advised in the wake of the strike to only perform public outreach through Governor Ammons, but spoke to his friend Samuel Rea, president the Pennsylvania Railroad, and was told to contact Rea's personal assistant, Lee. Despite the historical weight given to Lee's efforts on Rockefeller's behalf—with some claiming the campaign was among the first acts of large-scale public relations—Lee's involvement was only done as a secondary job, as he was still working full-time for Rea through the whole project.) This saw Rockefeller and King taking a tour of the CF&I mining communities in September 1915, notably including the miners of Valdez, who had largely not participated in the strike. These efforts would evolve into the Colorado Industrial Plan, better known as the Rockefeller Plan and the archetype for employee representation plans, as well as the creation of a CF&I company union. Through his connections with the YMCA, Rockefeller sought to encourage moral reform and provide social services that would support the miners, resulting in the YMCA creating a Mining Department and building a branch in Pueblo to serve the workers at the CF&I Minnequa steel mill there. In 1917, the chairman of CF&I's board, Lamont Montgomery Bowers, took over the company at the behest of Rockefeller.

== Legacy ==
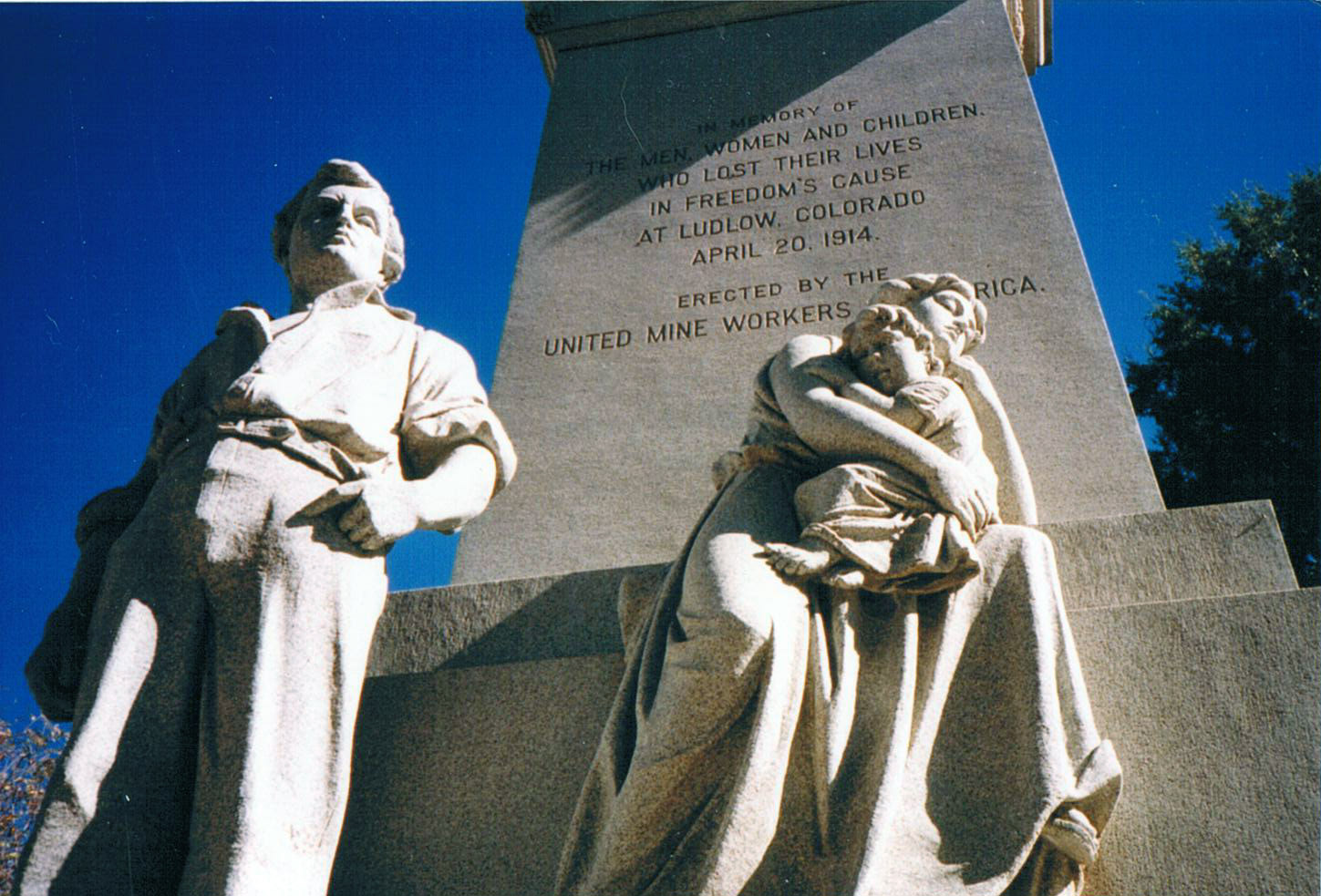
The Ludlow Monument in 2009 following repairs to the vandalized statues.

Frank Hayes, UMWA President from 1917 to 1919 and Lieutenant Governor of Colorado from 1937 to 1939, wrote a song in tribute to the striking miners entitled "We're Coming, Colorado" set to the tune of "Battle Cry of Freedom." Folk musician Woody Guthrie released "Ludlow Massacre" in 1944. Guthrie's song has been criticized by historians as perpetuating an inaccurate recounting of the events surrounding the Ludlow Massacre and the "Ten Days War."

The later Battle of Blair Mountain, also involving the Baldwin-Felts and UMWA, is considered the largest labor uprising in the U.S. by number of combatants. Contemporaneous accounts suggest the Blair Mountain strikers feared Baldwin-Felts would utilize a gun-equipped truck on their number, erroneously believing that the Death Special had been present at the Ludlow Massacre. Like the Colorado National Guard in 1913–1914, the West Virginia National Guard were drawn into the suppression of the strike at Blair Mountain.

Upton Sinclair, the author of the socialist activist novel The Jungle, wrote King Coal in 1917. The novel is set during the Colorado Coalfield War. He continued the story of King Coal’s protagonist, Hal Warner, with the novella The Coal War in 1917. This second text was rejected by publishers until 1974, after Sinclair’s death.

=== Academic appraisals ===
The conflict has also inspired many academic histories, among the first being Barron Beshoar's 1942 biography of John Lawson, Out of the Depths. In 1971, Mary T. O'Neal published Those Damn Foreigners, the only eyewitness account of the Ludlow Massacre. The Great Coalfield War by South Dakota Senator and 1972 presidential candidate George McGovern, co-authored with Leonard Guttridge, was published the same year as the former's presidential run. It was a revised version of McGovern's 1953 Ph.D. dissertation, The Colorado Coal Strike, 1913–1914, a study which had helped form some of McGovern's political sensibilities. Leftist historian Howard Zinn said Ludlow and the strike were "the culminating act of perhaps the most violent struggle between corporate power and laboring men in American history." In 1997, field work began on the University of Denver's Ludlow Massacre Archaeological Project, with research from the program published in multiple academic mediums.

In the Twenty-First Century, new histories and revaluations of the Colorado Coalfield War proposed new interpretations of the conflict and its outcomes. In particular, the interpretation of the Ludlow Massacre as a "massacre" became a matter of debate. While emphasizing the role of strikers as "agents" in the instigation of the fighting in his 2008 book Killing for Coal, Thomas Andrews has repeatedly supported the characterization of the events of 20 April 1914 as a massacre, a view supported by other academic accounts of the war. This view was contradicted by Scott Martelle in his 2007 book Blood Passion, with Martelle later defending his perspective by contending that evidence does not support the view that National Guard started the tent colony fire with the intention of killing non-combatant strikers.

=== Ludlow Monument ===
The UMWA purchased a 40-acre lot that contained the Ludlow Colony and some of the land around it and began work on the Ludlow Monument at the site in 1916. It was dedicated in 1918. The Ludlow Monument stood in relative obscurity for many years, with the only marker pointing drivers on I-25 towards the site being a sign installed by the UMWA. In the 1990s, a government-installed highway sign pointing to the Ludlow townsite and monument was installed. Following significant damage from vandalism in 2003, a celebration of the monument's restoration occurred on 5 June 2005 with roughly 400 people, including UMWA President Cecil Roberts, in attendance. The Ludlow Monument was dedicated as a National Historic Landmark on 28 June 2009.

Three years after the "Ten Days War", on 27 April 1917, a Victor-American Fuel Company mine in Hastings, near the former Ludlow camp, caught fire, killing 121 miners. They are commemorated by a marker nearby the monument to the victims of the Ludlow Massacre. Victor-American mines had been targeted during the strike, and some were destroyed during the last week of April 1914.

On 19 April 2013, Colorado governor John Hickenlooper signed an executive order creating the Ludlow Centennial Commemoration Commission in preparation for the hundredth anniversary of the Massacre a year later. A Greek Orthodox-led ecumenical service was held at the memorial site on 20 April 2014, which was coincidentally Easter in both the Western and Eastern calendars.

== See also ==
- Cripple Creek miners' strike of 1894
- Colorado Labor Wars
- 1927–1928 Colorado Coal Strike
- Columbine Mine massacre
- Copper Country strike of 1913–14
- Denver Streetcar Strike of 1920
- Steelworks Museum
