= Clara Ruth Mozzor =

American lawyer

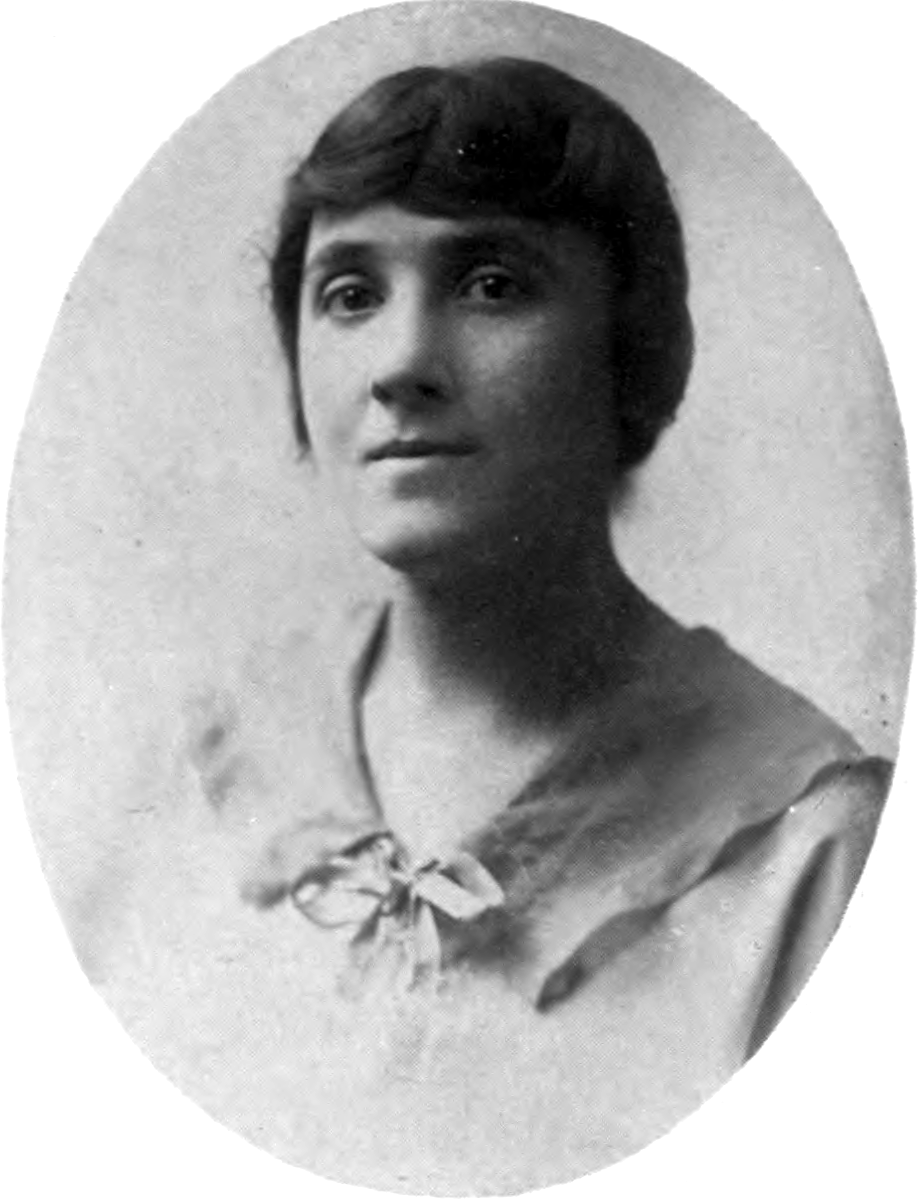
- Clara Ruth Mozzor, from a 1917 publication.
- Born: 1892; Providence, Rhode Island
- Died: After 1937
- Occupation: Lawyer
- Known for: Assistant attorney general in Colorado, 1917-1921

Clara Ruth Mozzor (1892 – died after 1937) was an American lawyer. She became Assistant Attorney General of Colorado in 1917, the first woman to serve in that role in any American state.

== Early life ==
Mozzor was born to Russian Jewish immigrant parents Peter and Celia Mozzor, in Providence, Rhode Island; she was raised in Denver, Colorado. She graduated from East Denver High School in 1909, and attended the University of Denver, and completed her education at the University of Colorado Law School in 1915.

== Career ==
Mozzor taught school as a young woman, helped to organize a settlement house in Denver, and wrote for newspapers. In 1913, she was a delegate to the Children's Welfare Congress held in Boston.

In 1914, during the Colorado Coalfield War, Mozzor wrote about visiting the scene of the Ludlow Massacre, two days after the event. "Waste and ruin, death and misery were the harvest of this war that was waged on helpless people," she wrote, for the International Socialist Review. "Mothers with babies at their breasts and babies at their skirts and mothers with babies yet unborn were the targets of this modern warfare."

Mozzor was admitted to the Colorado bar in 1915. She was the youngest woman lawyer in Colorado, and she became Assistant Attorney General of Colorado in 1917, the first woman to hold that position in any American state. She worked with Mary C. C. Bradford to raise money for Colorado soldiers during World War I, and she arranged for a vaudeville troupe to entertain the soldiers based in camps near Denver.

After marriage, Clara Mozzor Neuhaus lived in Omaha, and was active on the Nebraska state board of the League of Women Voters, and, as a doctor's wife, in the state chapter of the women's auxiliary of the American Medical Association.

== Personal life ==
Clara Mozzor married German-born psychiatrist George Emile Neuhaus in 1922. They lived in Nebraska and had daughters Ruth and Geisa, before Dr. Neuhaus died in 1938.
