= Leonard Guttridge =

English historian

Leonard Francis Guttridge (27 August 1918 – 7 June 2009) was an English historian and author.

== Biography ==
Guttridge was born on 27 August 1918 in Bournemouth, England. During World War II, he served as an aircraft mechanic in the British Royal Air Force. He immigrated to Washington, D.C., United States, in 1946, initially to work at the Indian Embassy. His first book, Jack Teagarden: the Story of a Jazz Maverick, which he co-authored with Jay Smith, was published in 1960. His subsequent books included The Commodores (1969), also co-authored with Smith; The Great Coalfield War (1972), co-authored with George McGovern and based on McGovern's Ph.D. thesis regarding the Colorado Coalfield War, Icebound: The Jeannette Expedition's Quest for the North Pole (1986), and Dark Union: the Secret Web of the Profiteers, Politicians, and Booth Conspirators That Led to Lincoln's Death (2003), co-authored with Ray Neff. Dark Union describes multiple conspiracy theories surrounding the assassination of Abraham Lincoln. Among its controversial claims were that an individual named "Boyd" was killed at Garrett's farm, the location where John Wilkes Booth is generally considered to have been killed, and that Booth escaped. The book also asserts that Booth then traveled to India, changed his name to John B. Wilkes, and accumulated considerable wealth there before his death in 1883. Guttridge died on 7 June 2009 at St. Marys Health Center in Topeka, Kansas.
