= Mary O'Neill =

Mary O'Neill may refer to:

- Marykate O'Neil (born 1968), American indie pop singer-songwriter
- Mary O'Neill (Canadian politician) (born 1941), Canadian member of the Legislative Assembly of Alberta
- Mary Devenport O'Neill (1879–1967), American poet
- Mary O'Neill (fencer) (born 1965), American Olympic fencer
- Mary-Anne O'Neill (born 1955), Australian politician

== See also ==
- Mary O'Neal (disambiguation)
- O'Neill (surname)
