= Mary Thomas O'Neal =

American labor activist (1887–c.1974)

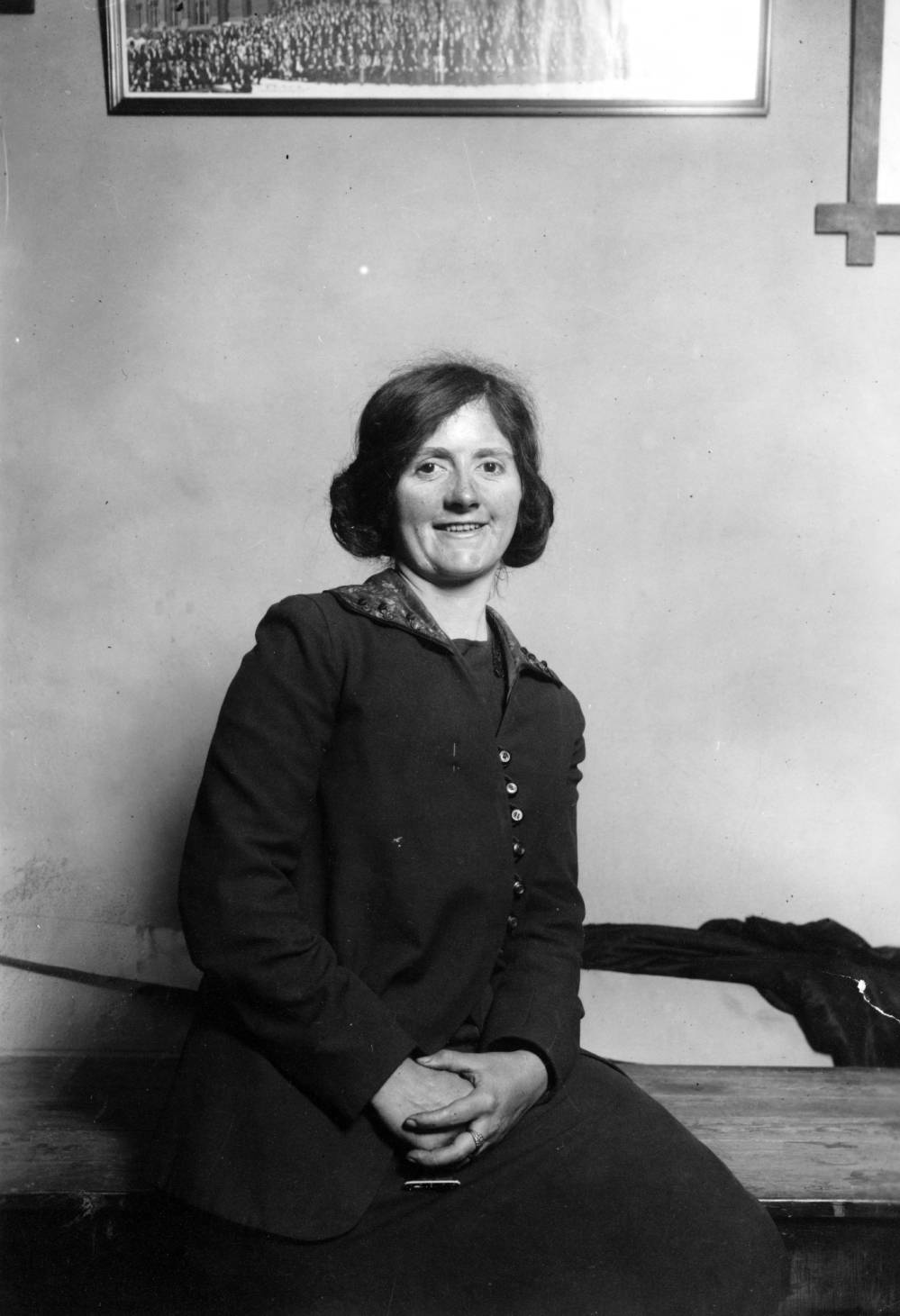
Mary O'Neal (Thomas), 1914

Mary Hannah Williams Thomas O'Neal (1887 – after 1974) was a Welsh-born American labor activist who wrote the only eyewitness memoir of the Ludlow Massacre, part of the Colorado Coalfield War.

== Early life ==
Mary Hannah Williams was born at Nantymoel, in the Ogmore Valley, South Wales, to parents James Williams and Mary A. Williams. Her father was a coal miner. She was married at age 17 to Tom Thomas, an American-born miner. She was the mother of two daughters when she moved to Colorado with her children in 1913, looking for her estranged miner husband.

== In the American West ==
At Ludlow, Colorado, Mary Thomas was soon involved with ongoing United Mine Workers of America efforts to organize the miners, including her singing to the strikers. She was arrested in riots in February 1914, and spent eleven days in jail. Thomas later said she had led the camp's women and children to safety at a nearby ranch when the militia attacked their tent city in April 1914, and arranged for them to be housed and fed. She lost all her own possessions in the attack, valued at $1,500 in press accounts. Arrested and detained, she used Welsh in her jailhouse conversations with Tom Thomas, knowing that the listening guards were unlikely to comprehend them. She also led fellow prisoners in singing union anthems.

After her release from jail, the union sent her and her young daughters to Washington D. C. to speak on her experiences, to raise awareness and cultivate allies for the miners' cause while a congressional committee investigated the violence during the strike. She traveled with a party including Judge Ben B. Lindsey, stayed at Hull House as a guest of Jane Addams, and met with President Woodrow Wilson and other officials to discuss conditions at Ludlow. In May 1914, she testified before the United States Commission on Industrial Relations in New York City.

Mary Thomas lived in Utah and Nevada after the events at Ludlow and her visit to Washington D. C. She worked as a waitress and later ran a restaurant and dance hall. She married again, to Don O'Neal, in Nevada.

== Later years ==
Mary Thomas (O'Neal) at the time of her interview in 1974

Mary Thomas O'Neal moved to Los Angeles later in life, and opened a clothing shop. After World War II she visited Wales again, with her second husband. In 1950 she attended a union commemoration at the Hollywood Palladium, and in 1965 she spoke at a memorial program at Ludlow. She wrote a memoir, Those Damn Foreigners (1971), considered the only "published eyewitness account of the Ludlow massacre." She lived in the Hollywood Knickerbocker Hotel as an old woman, and experienced memory loss before she died, probably in the 1970s.

Barbara Yule wrote a one-woman play about Mary Thomas, For Tomorrow We May Die, which was performed by Tanya Perkins in Colorado in 2015.
