= Starkville, Colorado =

Town in Colorado, United States

- Town
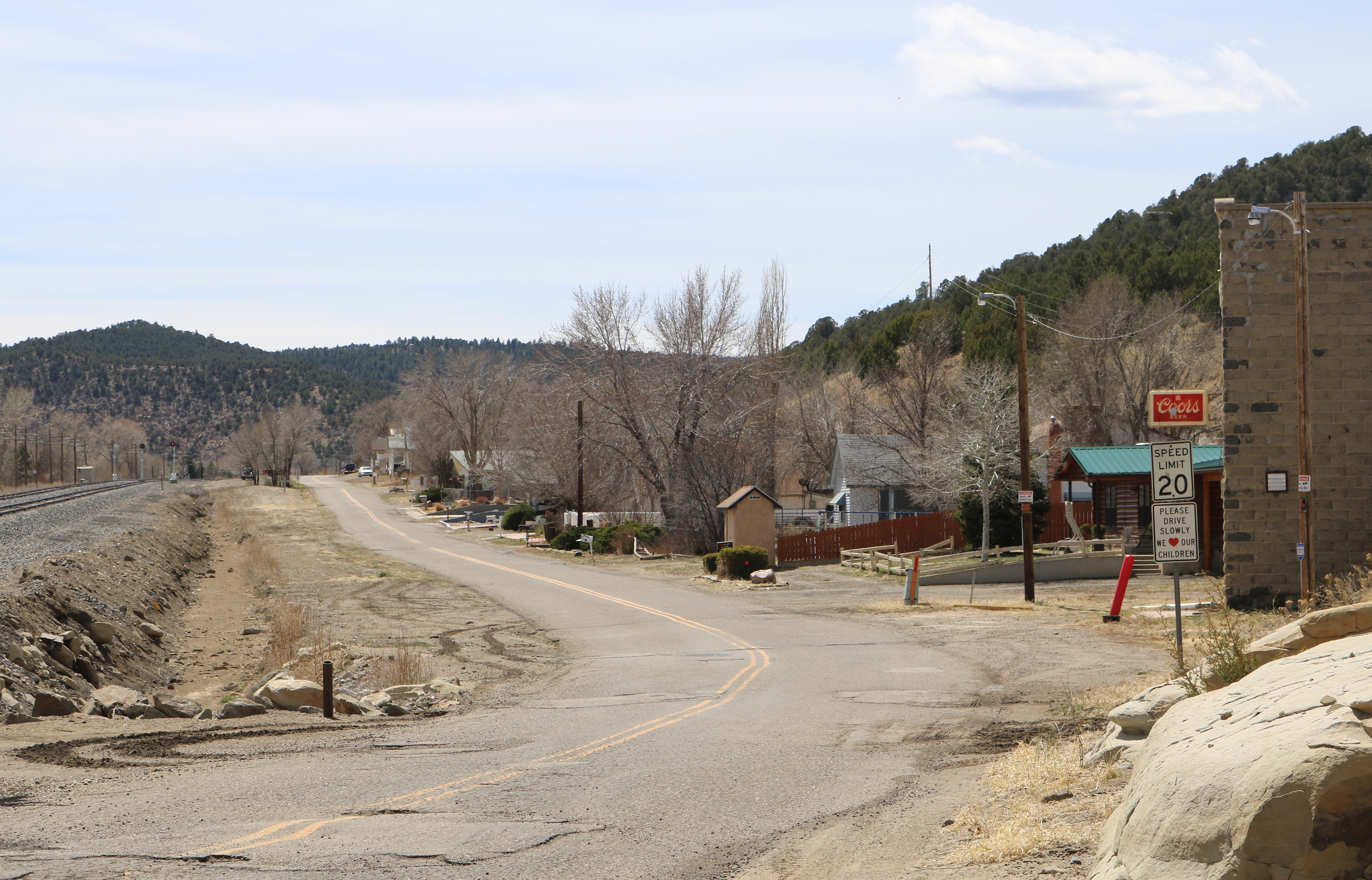
- East Railroad Avenue (shown) serves as Starkville's main street.

- Location of Starkville in Las Animas County, Colorado
- Coordinates: 37°07′01″N 104°31′24″W
- Country: United States
- State: Colorado
- County: Las Animas
- Incorporated: March 2, 1954
- Named for: Albert G. Stark

Government
  - Type: Statutory Town

Area
  - Total: 0.073 sq mi (0.19 km^{2})
  - Land: 0.073 sq mi (0.19 km^{2})
  - Water: 0 sq mi (0.00 km^{2})
- Elevation: 6,355 ft (1,937 m)

Population (2020)
  - Total: 62
  - Density: 739.9/sq mi (285.69/km^{2})
- Time zone: UTC-7 (Mountain (MST))
  - Summer (DST): UTC-6 (MDT)
- ZIP code: 81082
- Area code: 719
- GNIS feature ID: 2413331
- FIPS code: 08-73715

Starkville is a statutory town in Las Animas County, Colorado, United States. The population was 62 at the 2020 census.

== History ==
The town was named for Albert G. Stark, a coal mine owner.

The community was formerly a company-owned coal-mining town owned and operated by the Colorado Fuel and Iron Company. On October 8, 1910, an explosion at the Starkville mine killed 56 miners. Exactly a month later, an explosion at the nearby Victor-American Fuel Company mine in Delagua killed 76. Miners from Starkville aided in the recovery efforts.

== Geography ==
According to the United States Census Bureau, the town has a total area of 0.1 square miles (0.26 km^{2}), all of it land. Starkville is 4 miles (6.4 km) south of Trinidad and 8 miles (13 km) from the border with New Mexico at Raton Pass. In the 19th century the Santa Fe Trail passed through the community. Starkville is adjacent to Interstate 25 and the Atchison, Topeka and Santa Fe Railroad.

== Demographics ==
Historical population
Census	Pop.	Note	%±
1890	928		—
1960	261		—
1970	166		−36.4%
1980	127		−23.5%
1990	104		−18.1%
2000	128		23.1%
2010	59		−53.9%
2020	62		5.1%
U.S. Decennial Census

=== 2010 census ===
At the 2010 census, there were 59 people, 26 households, and 30 families living in the town. There were 35 housing units. The racial makeup of the town was 55.9% White, 1.7% Native American, 37.3% from other races, and 3.4% from two or more races. Hispanic or Latino of any race were 72.9% of the population.

Of the 26 households 23.1% had children under the age of 18 living with them, 46.2% were married couples living together, 11.5% had a female householder with no husband present, and 34.6% were non-families. 30.8% of households were one person and 11.5% were one person aged 65 or older. The average household size was 2.27 and the average family size was 2.76.

The age distribution was 22.1% under the age of 19, 6.8% from 20 to 24, 22.1% from 25 to 44, 35.7% from 45 to 64, and 13.6% 65 or older. The median age was 44.5 years.

The median household income was $46,250 and the median family income was $51,250.

=== 2000 census ===
At the 2000 census there were 128 people, 42 households, and 30 families living in the town. The population density was 1,245.1 inhabitants per square mile (480.7/km^{2}). There were 53 housing units at an average density of 515.6 units per square mile (199.1 units/km^{2}). The racial makeup of the town was 71.88% White, 3.91% Native American, 14.84% from other races, and 9.38% from two or more races. Hispanic or Latino of any race were 64.06%.

Of the 42 households 31.0% had children under the age of 18 living with them, 61.9% were married couples living together, 9.5% had a female householder with no husband present, and 26.2% were non-families. 21.4% of households were one person and 11.9% were one person aged 65 or older. The average household size was 3.05 and the average family size was 3.55.

The age distribution was 27.3% under the age of 18, 10.2% from 18 to 24, 26.6% from 25 to 44, 25.8% from 45 to 64, and 10.2% 65 or older. The median age was 35 years. For every 100 females, there were 96.9 males. For every 100 females age 18 and over, there were 106.7 males.

The median household income was $42,708 and the median family income was $50,000. Males had a median income of $30,417 versus $19,844 for females. The per capita income for the town was $14,297. There were 5.3% of families and 10.1% of the population living below the poverty line, including 18.2% of under eighteens and 22.2% of those over 64.

== See also ==
- Raton Pass
- Santa Fe National Historic Trail
