= Primero, Colorado =

Ghost town in Las Animas County, Colorado

Primero
- Mining ghost town
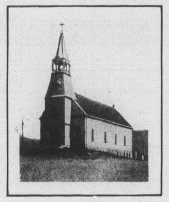
- Catholic church in Primero built by CF&I, 1914

- Location within the state of Colorado
- Coordinates: 37°08′33″N 104°44′30″W
- Country: United States
- State: Colorado
- County: Las Animas
- Elevation: 6,814 ft (2,077 m)
- Time zone: UTC-7 (Mountain (MST))
  - Summer (DST): UTC-6 (MDT)
- ZIP codes: 81233
- GNIS feature ID: 194641

Primero is a ghost town in Las Animas County, Colorado, United States. The community was a company coal mining town for the Colorado Fuel and Iron Company during the early 20th century.

== Description ==
The mining community was one of the first in the region, hence the name. In 1921, the mine employed roughly 275 miners. The town eventually came to contain 175 total buildings, including one Catholic and one Protestant church, a high school, and other amenities. The Protestant church, Union Protestant, was dedicated in April 1917 and hosted cultural events along with worship.

The coal produced at the Primero mine was largely employed in steel manufacturing, including at the CF&I plants at Pueblo–the Minnequa Steel Works–and Segundo. The closing of the steel works had an adverse effect on the demand for coal from the Primero mine, playing a role in the 1921 labor dispute between CF&I miners and the Company. During the duration of its operation, the mine produced 8,177,567 tons of coal.

== History ==
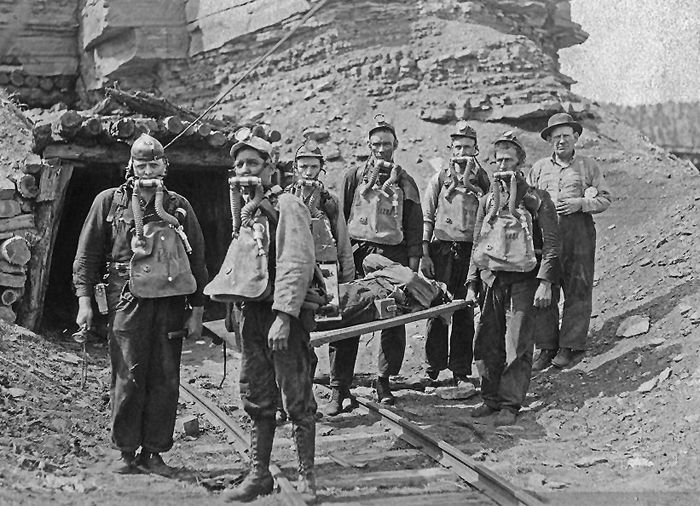
Miners in Primero recover casualties from the 31 January 1910 explosion that killed 75 at the Colorado Fuel & Iron mine

A post office called Primero was established in 1901, and remained in operation until 1933.

An explosion at the Primero mine killed 75 miners on 31 January 1910. The mine explosion has been cited as a relevant example of the unsafe conditions prevalent in CF&I mines in the years prior to the 1913-1914 Strike. On 8 November 1910, an explosion at the Victor-American Fuel Company mine at Delagua killed 76. Miners from Primero helped for survivors and recover bodies from the rubble.

In September 1913, a strike was called by the independent United Mine Workers of America union against CF&I. Over the next several months, sporadic violence saw deaths, including Primero. The violence escalated to 20 April 1914, when Colorado National Guard and company-supported militia committed the Ludlow Massacre against striking miners, leading to further violence in what is known as the Colorado Coalfield War.

Following the strike, CF&I–helmed by John D. Rockefeller Jr. and under the advisory of future Prime Minister of Canada William Lyon Mackenzie King–implemented a series of reforms intended to promote support for the Company. Among these were investments in new town infrastructure in communities owned by CF&I. Among the structures built was a Catholic church, which, until the completion of the nearby Protestant church, housed the liturgies of multiple denominations. Bishop John Henry Tihen, bishop of the Diocese of Denver, visited the church in Primero in May 1921. During the visit, he confirmed 17 children in the town.

During World War I, at least 48 men from Primero joined the United States military. The town also contributed $34,900 ($550,000 in 2015) in liberty bonds during the Third Liberty Loan.

In 1921, a labor dispute over pay changes saw miners strike for several months, from 23 August through November. During the strike–referred to by the Company as a "closure"–saw a large number of the mine's employees leaving Primero. In part, the fight over the wages pertained to whether those at Primero would be represented by their choice of the UMWA–membership of which was then prohibited by CF&I–or the company union that was a part of the Company's Industrial Representation Plan. Ultimate, Colorado's Industrial Commission sided with the company in prohibiting membership to the UMWA and enforcing CF&I's wages that were negotiated with the company union.

The town was depopulated in 1928, and by 1 August 1933 all assets were either sold or dismantled.

== See also ==
- Segundo, Colorado, the second Spanish numerically named town established by Colorado Fuel & Iron
- Tercio, Colorado, the third Spanish numerically named town established by Colorado Fuel & Iron
