= Primero (disambiguation) =

Primero may refer to:

- Primero, a 16th-century gambling card game
- Primero River, a river in Cordoba, Argentina
- Primero, Colorado, a ghost town
- Primero, Ponce, Puerto Rico, a barrio in the municipality of Ponce, Puerto Rico
