= John R. Lawson =

Union leader and businessman

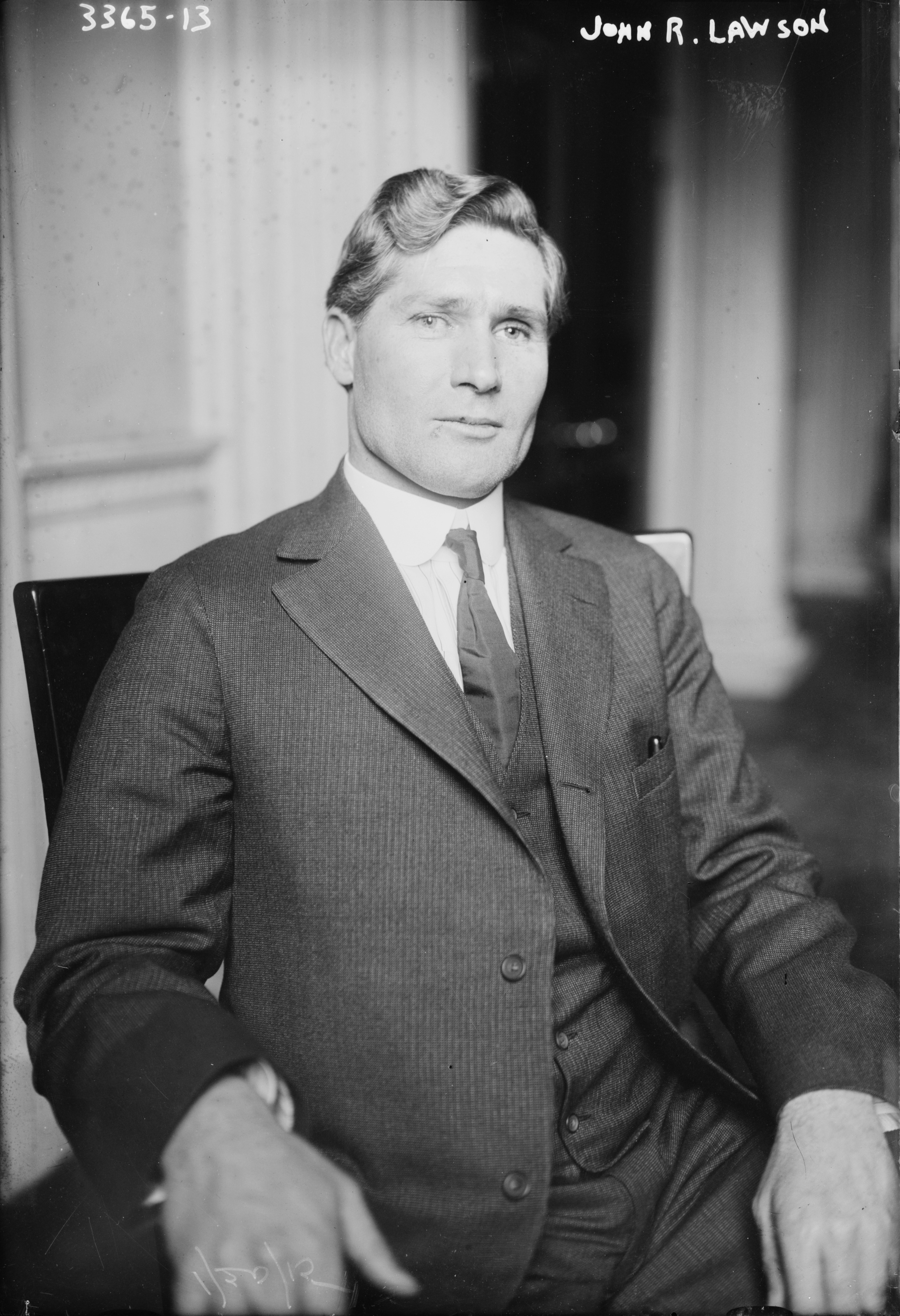
Lawson in 1915

John Rankin Lawson (March 5, 1871 – May 12, 1945) was a Colorado union leader and businessman. He was the leader of District 15 of the United Mine Workers of America (UMWA) at the time of the Colorado Coalfield War and the Ludlow Massacre. He was convicted on May 3, 1915, of the murder of a deputy sheriff who died at Ludlow during the massacre at a trial held in Trinidad, Colorado and sentenced to life at hard labor, but freed on appeal to the Colorado Supreme Court in June 1917. He served as president of the Colorado Federation of Labor and on the International Executive Board of the United Mine Workers. He was a vice-president and director of the Rocky Mountain Fuel Company (CF&I).

== Life ==
Born to Scottish parents in Pennsylvania in 1871, Lawson was raised in a union household by a father who was at various times part of the Knights of Labor and United Mine Workers. At age 10, Lawson began work as a "trapper boy," preventing the build-up of dangerous gases in the enclosed spaces of a mine. Lawson was sent to Philadelphia at 17 to aid his brother in stone-working.

After working at mines in Rosenburg, Oregon and Rock Springs, Wyoming, Lawson moved to Walsen (near Walsenburg, Colorado), Colorado with his father in 1896. After moving to another CF&I owned and operated town–New Castle–he joined the UMWA when a local chapter was founded there in 1898. Lawson was elected to the International Executive Board of the UMWA in 1906 and served as a board member through 1917.

Lawson participated in strikes in 1900, 1903-1904 (in what is known as the Cripple Creek Strike), 1910, and in the major 1913–1914. During the Cripple Creek Strike–on the night of 17 December 1903–Lawson's family home was among those of other strikers that were dynamited in what some historians believe was an attack executed by mine operators. His daughter Fern was not injured in the explosion, but is reported to have been thrown from her crib by the force of the blast. Local minor mine owner Perry C. Coryell, had previously shot and seriously injured Lawson five months prior with a shotgun in New Castle, near where Coryell owned a mine in Garfield County.

Lawson as an officer as UMWA Executive Board Officer, 1915.

During the 1913-1914 strike against CF&I, Lawson was involved in activities both pertaining to organizing peaceful elements of the UMWA strike as well as formally ordering armed striking miners to attack targets, such as the Colorado and Southern Railway that passed near Ludlow.

Following years of strikes which ended in relative failure, Lawson joined the Rocky Mountain Fuel Company as vice president, serving in that position from 1927 to 1939.

== Commission on Industrial Relations ==
In 1915, Lawson testified before the Commission on Industrial Relations denouncing John D. Rockefeller Jr. for his ignorance regarding conditions at his coal mines and camps in Colorado describing local elections in the Rockefeller-controlled company towns in Colorado where election judges counted the votes of sheep, mules, and even box cars. He also testified that on the night of December 17, 1903, his home in New Castle, Colorado, and those of 4 other union organizers had been dynamited.

== Notes ==
- Beshoar, Barron B., Out of the Depths: The Story of John R. Lawson, A Labor Leader, The Colorado Labor Historical Committee of the Denver Area Labor Federation (1st edition, April, 1942; 4th printing Golden Bell Press, Denver, 1980), trade paperback, 372 pages
