= Victor-American Fuel Company =

Former coal mining company

Victor-American Fuel Company, also styled as the Victor Fuel Company, was a coal mining company, primarily focused on operations in the US states of Colorado and New Mexico during the first half of the 20th century. Prior to a 1909 reorganization, the business was known as the American Fuel Company.

== Company history ==
Company president John C. Osgood took the lead of the company in 1903 after being forced out of another company he had founded, Colorado Fuel and Iron Company, by future part-owner John D. Rockefeller. Behind the Colorado Fuel and Iron Company, the Victor-American Fuel Company was the second-largest coal company in the state–and the wealthiest owned by Coloradans–during the first decades of the 20th century. During the 1913-1914 Colorado Coalfield War, strikebreakers and mine guards working for Victor-American that had been hired in response to the United Mine Workers of America-led labor uprising were targeted in attacks.

== Operations ==
Like other Colorado coal mining companies of the era, Victor-American operated company-owned mining towns that housed its workers across many sites. Victor-American acquired mining sites throughout Colorado, establishing towns to support operations. These mines include Bowen, Chandler, Delagua, Hastings, Pinnacle Mine in the Oak Creek fields, and Wadge Mine. Some of these mines were home to significant Asian-American populations, which occasionally were utilized as strikebreakers against collectivizing White miners, especially at Chandler.

By 1987, Victor-American had registered itself as a corporation in Maine.

== List of mining disasters ==
At the Bowen Mine near Trinidad, Colorado, an explosion of dust ignited by giant powder on 7 August 1902 killed 13 people.

On 8 November 1910, at Delagua, an explosion at the Victor-American coal mine killed 76 miners. A group of recovery parties were gathered from the nearby mining communities at Hastings, Berwind, and others. Miners from Primero and Starkville, both CF&I towns that had suffered a major disaster earlier that year (the latter exactly a month earlier), rushed to send help.

The Hastings Mine Disaster took place on 27 April 1917, killing 121 miners at the Victor-American mine. The Hastings mine was not far from Ludlow, site of the Ludlow Massacre, the most violent point in the 1913-1914 Colorado Coalfield War that saw some Victor-American property damaged by armed striking miners.

At Delagua on 27 May 1927, six miners were killed in an explosion of the No. 3 shaft, the same shaft that had collapsed in 1910.

On 27 January 1942, 34 miners were killed at the Victor-American Wadge Mine on Mount Harris in Routt County.
