= Josephine Roche =

Colorado businesswoman, Progressive Era activist, New Deal administration official

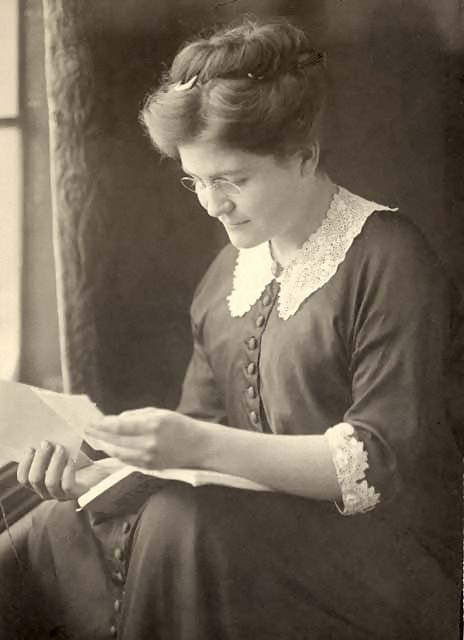

United States Assistant Secretary of the Treasury
- In office December 1, 1934 – November 1, 1937
- President: Franklin D. Roosevelt
- Preceded by: Thomas Hewes
- Succeeded by: John Wesley Hanes II

Personal details
- Born: Josephine Aspinwall Roche; December 2, 1886 Neligh, Nebraska, U.S.
- Died: July 1, 1976 (aged 89)
- Party: Progressive (until c. 1920); Democratic
- Spouse: Edward Hale Bierstadt (m. 1920; div. 1922)
- Education: Vassar College (BA); Columbia University (MSW)

Josephine Aspinwall Roche (December 2, 1886 – July 1976) was an American humanitarian, industrialist, Progressive Era activist, and politician. As a New Deal official she helped shape the modern American welfare state. She was inducted into the Colorado Women's Hall of Fame in 1986.

== Background ==
Josephine Roche was born in Neligh, Nebraska, and raised in Omaha, attending private girls' schools there before matriculating at Vassar College in 1904. There she double-majored in economics and classics, and participated in basketball and track clubs. After graduating in 1908, Roche earned a master's degree in social work in 1910 from Columbia University.

== Career ==
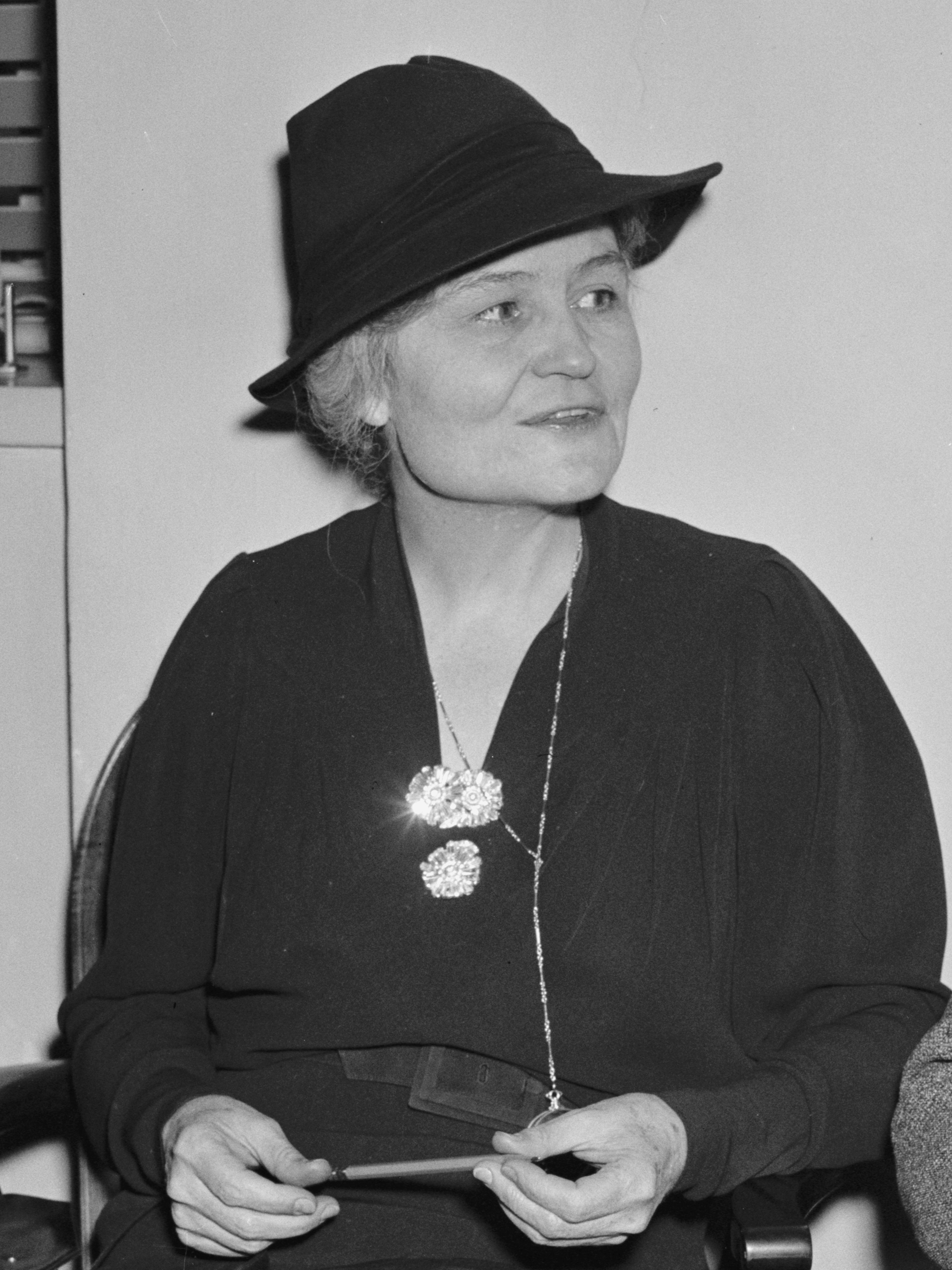
Josephine Roche on 31 October 1938 at conference on U.S. Health Plan in Washington, DC

In 1906, her parents, John and Ella Roche, moved to Denver, where much of her life's work would be centered. Roche volunteered for social causes in both New York City and Denver, studied cost of living issues, and in 1912 returned to Denver full-time to become that city's first female police officer. However, her tenure there was short-lived, as her zealous prosecution of sumptuary laws and prostitution caused the city's more lenient law enforcement community to force her resignation.

Over the following decade, Roche held a number of jobs in Denver and Washington, D.C., including serving as chair of the Colorado Progressive Party and campaigning against child labor in the sugar beet industry. While in Washington, she was briefly married to author Edward Hale Bierstadt, a colleague at the Foreign Language Information Service, of which she was the director; the marriage lasted from 1920 to 1922 and ended in divorce. In 1925, she returned to Colorado due to her father's failing health, and in 1927 inherited his holdings in the Rocky Mountain Fuel Company, a coal mining company which he had founded. By 1929, she had purchased a majority interest in the company and became president. She then proceeded to enact a variety of pro-labor policies, including an invitation for the United Mine Workers of America (UMWA) to return to Colorado and unionize her mines, 15 years after her father and other coal mine owners had broken the unions in the aftermath of the Ludlow Massacre of 1914.

In 1934, Roche left Rocky Mountain Fuel to run for Governor of Colorado. After being defeated in the Democratic Party primary by Edwin C. Johnson, president Franklin D. Roosevelt appointed her as Assistant Secretary of the Treasury. She held that post from 1934 until 1937. In 1936, she had John L. Lewis, president of the UMWA and also of the nascent Congress of Industrial Organizations (CIO) meet with New Deal legal expert Lee Pressman, later an admitted Communist and alleged Soviet spy.

In 1937, she resigned to return to Colorado and run Rocky Mountain Fuel following the death of its president. However, the company was too much impacted by a variety of economic forces, and declared bankruptcy in 1944. The company was ordered by bankruptcy court to liquidate assets and all mines ceased operation but the liquidation was not completed. Roche continued in control of the defunct company and the remaining assets and moved to Washington, D.C. Roche became president of Rocky Mountain Fuel Company in 1950 and maintained control of the company's non-liquidated assets until her death in 1976.

Beginning in 1948, Roche served as one of three directors of the United Mine Workers' welfare and retirement fund. In 1968, the union and its leadership were sued for mismanagement of the fund. The mismanagement charge was eventually proven in court, forcing Roche to step down in 1971.

Over the course of her life, Roche was honored by a number of business and civic organizations, and received honorary degrees from Smith College, Oglethorpe University, Mount Holyoke College, and the University of Colorado.

== Welfare reform ==
Roche was a leader in health care reform, but organized efforts to launch national health insurance failed repeatedly—most notably in 1916, 1938–40, and 1943. Roche headed the New Deal insurance campaign in 1938-40, which had the best chance of success. From her position as Roosevelt's assistant secretary of the treasury, Roche led an interdepartmental study team and convened a 1938 conference to address national health. However, after the conference, Roosevelt withdrew his support. The major legislation proposed by the liberal leader in the Senate, Robert F. Wagner, died in 1940 in the face of opposition from the Conservative coalition. Opposition from the American Medical Association and private insurance companies was intense. Historian C. Richard Mulcahy argues that Roche herself was responsible for the 1938-40 failure. She did not try to develop a national support base and she did not provide a rationale for establishing health care as a national right.

Reformers hoped Roche would become the administrator of the new Federal Security Agency in 1939, but President Franklin Roosevelt passed her over. Her poor performance in building support for national health insurance annoyed FDR. She had wide contacts but they worked at cross purposes and there was no self-contained and unified female network.

== Tributes ==
In Lafayette, Colorado, two Boulder County housing projects have been named after Roche: Josephine Commons affordable senior housing, with October 2011 groundbreaking and first residents in summer 2012, and the Aspinwall Development, adjacent to the Josephine Roche Open Space. Both housing projects are located on land previously owned by the Rocky Mountain Fuel Company.
