= Chandler, Colorado =

Ghost town in Fremont County, Colorado, USA

- Ghost town
- Location of Chandler, Colorado Chandler (Colorado)
- Coordinates: 38°22′23″N 105°12′02″W
- Country: United States
- State: Colorado
- County: Fremont
- Elevation: 5,738 ft (1,749 m)

Population (2020)
  - Total: 0
- Time zone: UTC−07:00 (MST)
  - Summer (DST): UTC−06:00 (MDT)
- ZIP code: Cañon City 81212
- Area code: 719
- GNIS pop ID: 204919

Chandler is an extinct coal company town located south of the Lincoln Park area near Cañon City in Fremont County, Colorado, United States.

== History ==
Chandler was a company coal mining town owned and operated by the Victor-American Fuel Company. It is located south of State Highway 115 along a county road named Chandler Road, west of Williamsburg, Colorado and north of Rockvale, Colorado. The Chandler, Colorado, post office operated from August 4, 1890, until October 31, 1942. It was originally homesteaded in the 1880s, and the last ore was hauled out in 1942. The town is now completely depopulated. Chandler was home to a significant Asian-American mining population.

== See also ==
- Front Range Urban Corridor
- List of ghost towns in Colorado
