= Rocky Mountain Fuel Company =

Former Colorado coal mining company

- Type: Private
- Founded: July 1894
- Defunct: 2006
- Successor: Goodridge & Marfell

The Rocky Mountain Fuel Company was a coal mining company located in Colorado, operating mines in Louisville, Lafayette, and other locations northwest of Denver. The company also operated mines in Las Animas, Routt, Garfield and Gunnison counties. During the 1930s, the company was the second-largest producer of coal by volume in the state of Colorado. However, the company was severely impacted by the Great Depression, declining productivity of local coal deposits, and the increased popularity of natural gas, and went bankrupt in 1944.

== Background ==
=== Predecessor ===
Founded in the 1870s as Goodridge & Marfell by Henry Goodridge (1832 – ?) and Erie, Colorado pioneer Hiram Marfell (1840–1904), both immigrants from England, the coal dealership was incorporated in 1890 as Stewart Coal & Lime Company, located in Denver. Stewart Coal & Lime Company was purchased in 1893 by the dashing former Nebraska farmer Edgar Edmund Shumway (1862–1914), who launched his coal dealership Shumway & Company in 1891. Shumway's partner in the purchase was Joseph Mitchell Jr. (1847–1921), owner of the New Mitchell mine in Lafayette, Colorado. Mitchell's father, Joseph Sr., was the superintendent at the mine and lived in Lafayette.

=== Founding ===
In July 1894, Shumway and Mitchell changed the name of the company from Stewart Coal & Lime Company to Rocky Mountain Fuel Company, operating at 1609 Curtis in Denver. Fifteen years later and owning eight Southern Colorado and Western Slope coal mines in Rockvale, Sopris, Trinidad, Maitland and Cardiff, E.E. Shumway — sans Joseph Mitchell Jr. — incorporated under the laws of Wyoming as Rocky Mountain Fuel Company of Wyoming in 1910.

== History ==
In October 1911, RM Fuel purchased the Northern Coal and Coke Company for $5 million from owners F.F. Struby, G.A. Easterly and C.B. Kountze. At its peak in 1898, Northern Coal Co. executives boasted assets exceeding $30 million. RM Fuel borrowed $1 million and raised another $3.8 million via a bond sale to purchase Northern Coal assets that included 2,500 acres of coal land, nine coal mines, several company stores and Denver coal yards. The mines purchased included the Simpson, Rex, Industrial, Vulcan and Nonpareil mines in Boulder County and the coal rights associated with or formerly held by Empire Coal Company, Aguilar Coal and Mining Company, Louisville Coal Mining Company, Imperial Coal Mining Company and Union Pacific Coal Company. The sale also included 214 residential lots in Louisville, 25 residential lots in Lafayette, 1,150 pit cars, 80 air mining machines, 26 horses, 29 wagons and 140 mules.

Company President E.E. Shumway died in 1914 from injuries sustained while investigating the aftermath of the disastrous 1913 explosion that killed 37 miners at the Coryell Vulcan mine in Garfield County. David W. Brown (1860–1922), who joined RM Fuel in about 1900, succeeded Shumway.

Company financial statements from 1920 show that RM Fuel and its nine-store mercantile division, the Rocky Mountain Stores Company, was managed by D. W. Brown and had over $12 million in assets, $3.5 million in debt and employed 845 people. The company was producing one million tons of coal each year.

John J. Roche (1848–1927), a lawyer and banker by trade, interviewed for a position at Rocky Mountain Fuel Company in 1906, then moved his family from Nebraska to Denver in 1907 to join RM Fuel, replacing company Secretary-Treasurer H.E. Stewart. Roche eventually became Vice-President and Treasurer of the company, and took over management of RM Fuel after the death of D.W. Brown in June 1922. The largest stockholder in the company, Roche died in 1927 and left an $128,000 estate.

== Demise ==
The company is notable among the many coal mine operators in the same region at the time for its leadership by Josephine Roche. She inherited a minority stock ownership from her father upon his death in 1927, becoming vice president of the company in 1928 and president by 1929. Roche was a dedicated believer in labor unions, and soon after becoming president she invited the United Mine Workers of America back to Rocky Mountain Fuel Company's mines, offering top pay and taking actions to repair labor-management relations. This was to the great chagrin of fellow mine owners, who broke the unions in 1914 after years of intense and often violent disputes, culminating in events such as the Columbine Mine and Ludlow Massacres. Roche's pro-labor policies, however, were effective – within a few years, the company's productivity per worker was the best in the state. After leaving the company in 1934 to enter politics, Roche returned in 1937, but even with the active support of her workers she was unable to save the company, which folded in 1944.

The company was ordered by bankruptcy court to liquidate assets and all mines ceased operation but the liquidation was not completed. Roche continued in control of the reorganized company and the remaining assets and moved to Washington, D.C. Roche became president of Rocky Mountain Fuel Company in 1950 and maintained control of the company's non-liquidated assets until her death in 1976.

John R. Lawson, unionist and United Mine Workers of America leader during the 1903 Cripple Creek strike and 1913-14 Coalfield War, served as vice president of the company from 1927 to 1939. Still holding valuable land, water rights and mineral rights, the RM Fuel experienced a resurgence of sorts in the 1970s under direction of Gerald “Jerry” R. Armstrong, who was RM Fuel president from 1973 to 2006.
