= Loutra, Rethymno =

Village on Crete, Greece

Coordinates: 35.35630°N 24.58605°E

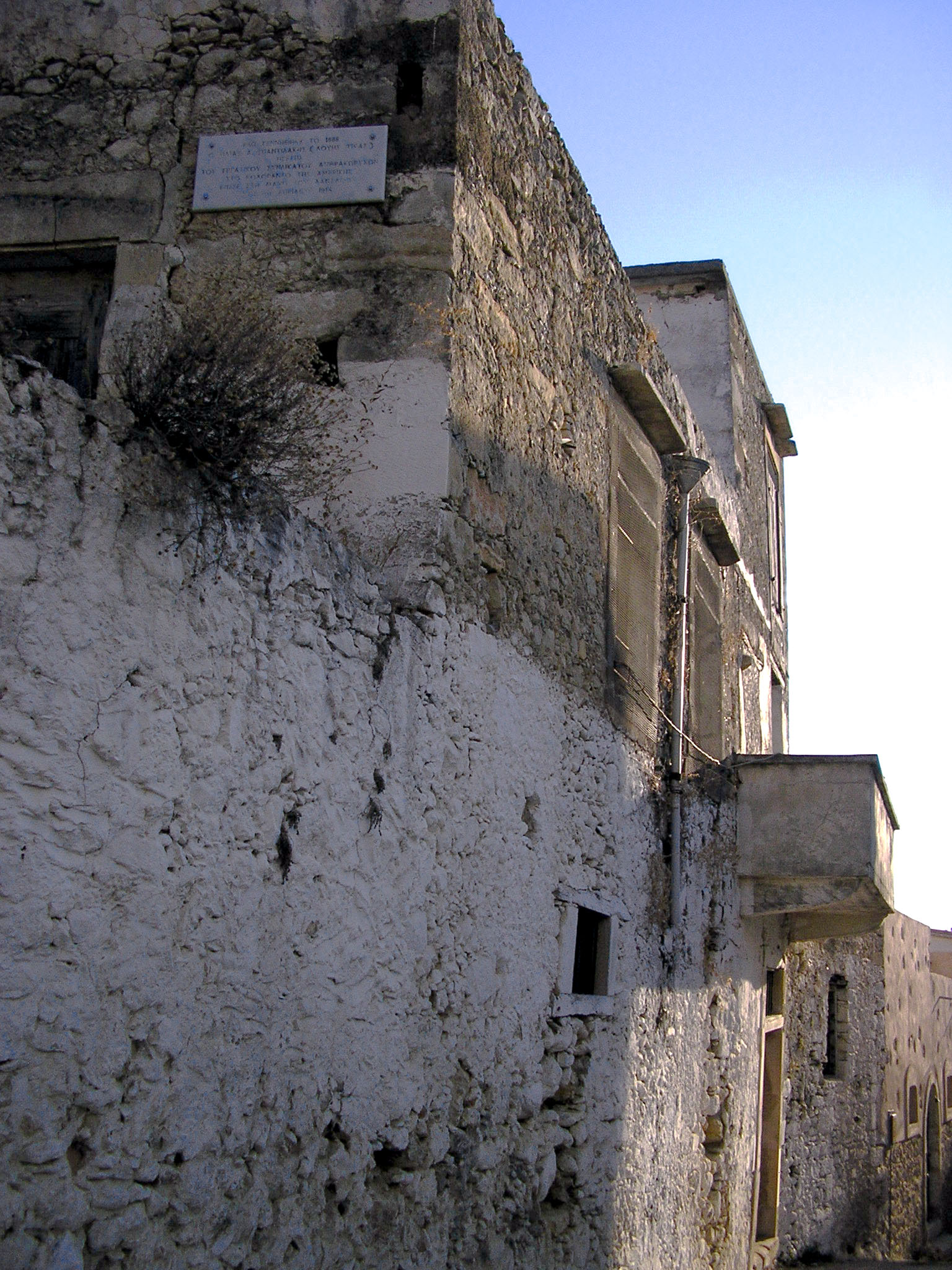
House of Louis Tikas in the village of Loutra, Rethymno regional unit, Crete.

Loutra (Greek: Λουτρά or Λουτρά Ρεθύμνου) is a medieval village of central Crete, Rethymno regional unit, Rethymno municipality, Arkadi municipal unit. It is situated 2 km from the Bay of Rethymno and 8 km from the town of Rethymno.

The village lies on the main road from Pigi to Arkadi and continuing eastwards for a further 1.5 km. Loutra is referred to by the same name (Lutra) in Venetian sources of the 16th century. The village owes its name to the baths ( Loutrà in Greek) of the inhabitants of the village Aliakes, which was close by but has disappeared today. Elsewhere in the sources it is called Lustra or Lucia. Loutra is situated in the midst of olive groves, and is characterized by its narrow cobbled streets and bougainvillea plants, Venetian buildings and the blazons of the Kallergi family.

Visitors of Loutra have the opportunity to visit the fabrika (old oil mill), which was used a few decades ago for oil pressing, the medieval fountain with the Turkish inscription, and the house of Ilias Spantidakis (a.k.a. Louis Tikas), leader of a workers' union of coalminers in Colorado, USA. In the central square of the village of Loutra is found the Villa Kallergi.

The village was once occupied by Cretan Muslims who were replaced in 1922 by Greek refugees from Asia Minor. Outside the village, a little track leads to the church of Agios Panteleimon and the memorial to Loutra inhabitants executed by the Nazis during the Axis occupation of Greece in World War II.

The monasteries of Arkadi and Arsani are also in the vicinity.

== Climate ==
Loutra has a hot-summer Mediterranean climate (Köppen climate classification: Csa). Loutra experiences hot, dry summers and mild winters with substantial precipitation.

Climate data for Loutra
Month	Jan	Feb	Mar	Apr	May	Jun	Jul	Aug	Sep	Oct	Nov	Dec	Year
Mean daily maximum °C (°F)	14.22 (57.60)	14.73 (58.51)	16.39 (61.50)	19.73 (67.51)	23.61 (74.50)	27.89 (82.20)	29.33 (84.79)	28.80 (83.84)	27.30 (81.14)	23.63 (74.53)	19.25 (66.65)	15.67 (60.21)	21.71 (71.08)
Daily mean °C (°F)	11.66 (52.99)	11.74 (53.13)	12.73 (54.91)	16.01 (60.82)	19.93 (67.87)	24.02 (75.24)	26.02 (78.84)	25.45 (77.81)	23.37 (74.07)	19.54 (67.17)	15.22 (59.40)	12.77 (54.99)	18.20 (64.77)
Mean daily minimum °C (°F)	8.19 (46.74)	8.12 (46.62)	9.04 (48.27)	11.44 (52.59)	14.11 (57.40)	18.10 (64.58)	20.49 (68.88)	20.45 (68.81)	18.35 (65.03)	14.38 (57.88)	12.68 (54.82)	10.11 (50.20)	13.79 (56.82)
Average precipitation mm (inches)	117.55 (4.63)	91.13 (3.59)	74.7 (2.94)	28.29 (1.11)	13.15 (0.52)	3.81 (0.15)	1.30 (0.05)	1.56 (0.06)	15.17 (0.60)	58.11 (2.29)	91.95 (3.62)	111.03 (4.37)	607.75 (23.93)
Mean monthly sunshine hours	110.24	124.93	174.89	231.99	299.13	348.58	359.09	331.10	277.32	203.96	136.44	104.65	2,702.32
Source: Hellenic National Meteorological Service
