= Delagua, Colorado =

Ghost town in Las Animas County, Colorado, US

- ghost town
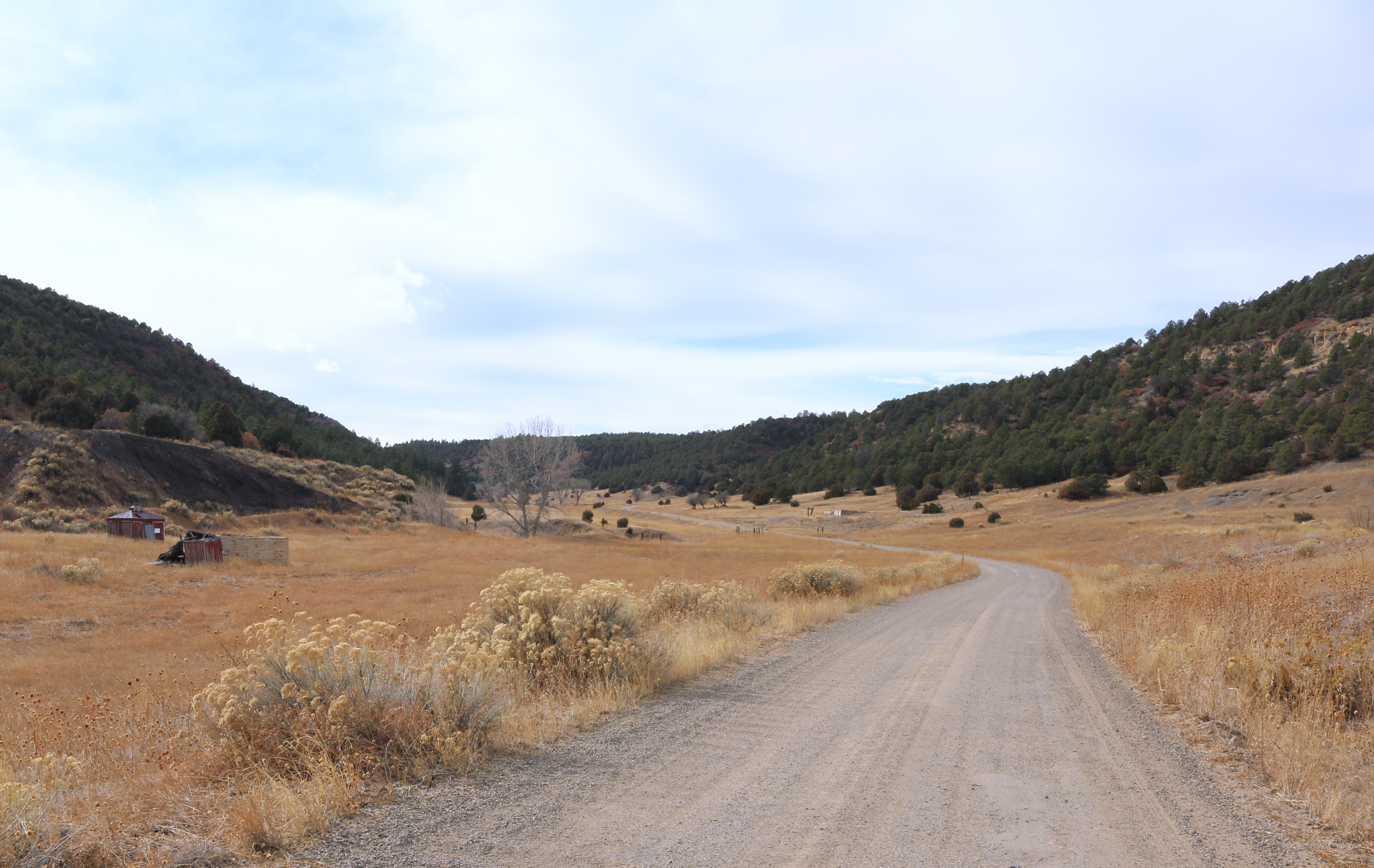
- The Delagua site and County Road 44

- Location of Delagua, Colorado. Delagua (Colorado)
- Coordinates: 37.3400°N 104.6630°W
- Country: United States
- State: Colorado
- County: Las Animas
- Elevation: 6,686 ft (2,038 m)
- Time zone: UTC−07:00 (MST)
  - Summer (DST): UTC−06:00 (MDT)
- ZIP code: Trinidad 81082
- Area code: 719
- GNIS place ID: 194549

Delagua is an extinct town in Las Animas County, Colorado, United States. The town site is about 5 miles (8 km) south of Aguilar. It served as a company-owned coal-mining town for the Victor-American Fuel Company.

== History ==
The Delagua post office operated from April 30, 1903, until May 31, 1954. The Trinidad, Colorado, post office (ZIP code 81082) now serves the area.

Delagua is a name derived from Spanish meaning "of the water" (and it refers to the 'canon of the water'). Delagua was incorporated as a town in 1903, and its post office opened the same year. The Colorado and Southeastern Railway was extended to serve the mine and town.

=== Delagua Mine ===
Delagua developed around the Delagua bituminous coal mine, opened in 1903 and operated by the Victor American Fuel Company. It was located in Canon Del Agua, situated approximately three miles west of the Hastings Mine, the site of a mine explosion in 1917, and 8 miles (13 kilometers) west of the site of the Ludlow Massacre, which occurred in 1914. As of 1922, it was the largest mine in Colorado, and at its peak employed at least 900 men.

=== Delagua Social Club ===
In October 1917, the Delagua Mine was considered one of the "largest and finest 'mining camps' in the state". By 1916, the saloon and dance hall had been converted into the Delagua Social Club, complete with "three first class pool tables and one billiard table", a soda fountain, bowling alleys, a stage that featured a motion picture show twice weekly and, at least, 250 members, in 1917.

=== Mine explosion ===
At the Delagua Mine on November 8, 1910, an explosion (loud enough to be heard three miles away in Hastings) killed 76 miners. Safety inspectors later determined that the blast was an explosion of gas and dust, caused by the open flame of a head lamp. One month earlier, a similar explosion at the Starkville Mine claimed 57, which combined with the lives lost in the Delagua disaster resulted in 136 deaths in Las Animas County, in just one month.

A smaller disaster on May 27, 1927, killed six.

Delagua was also the site of armed conflict between strikers and strike-breakers during the Colorado Coalfield War in 1914. A Colorado House of Representatives subcommittee heard testimony that strikebreaking workers were lured to the Delagua mine, under false pretenses, and held there by force.

The mine was abandoned in 1969.

Historical population
Census	Pop.	Note	%±
1910	958		—
1920	1,035		8.0%
1930	1,021		−1.4%
1940	422		−58.7%
1950	239		−43.4%

== See also ==
- List of ghost towns in Colorado
- List of populated places in Colorado
- List of post offices in Colorado
