= Louis Tikas =

Greek American miner and union leader

- Born: Elias Anastasios Spantidakis; 13 March 1886; Loutra, Crete Eyalet, Ottoman Empire
- Died: 20 April 1914 (aged 28); Ludlow, Colorado, U.S.
- Cause of death: Gunshot wounds
- Occupations: Miner, union leader
- Known for: Involvement in Ludlow mine strike

Louis Tikas (Greek: Λούης Τίκας), born Elias Anastasios Spantidakis (Greek: Ηλίας Αναστάσιος Σπαντιδάκης; 13 March 1886 – 20 April 1914), was the main labor union organizer at the Ludlow camp during the 14-month strike known as the Colorado Coalfield War in southern Colorado, between September 1913 and December 1914; described as "the bloodiest civil insurrection in American history since the Civil War". He was shot and killed during the Ludlow Massacre, the bloodiest event of the strike, on 20 April 1914.

== Biography ==
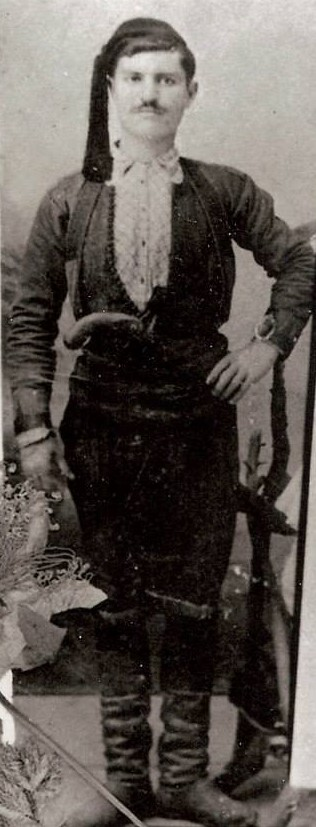
Louis Tikas just before his departure for America in 1906

Tikas was born Elias Anastasios Spantidakis in Loutra, Crete, on 13 March 1886. During his teenage years, Tikas came to embrace Greek nationalism. In 1905, he participated in the Theriso revolt with Eleftherios Venizelos. He later described his fellow Greek strikers in Ludlow as ready to fight "just as their fathers and brothers... have fought the Turks". After the revolt failed, he migrated to the United States in 1906.

In 1910, the year Tikas filed his citizenship papers in the United States, he was part owner of a Greek coffeehouse on Market Street in Denver. He worked as a miner–strikebreaker in Colorado's Northern (Coal) Field but ended up leading a walkout by 63 fellow Greeks at the mine in Frederick, Colorado. Tikas was chased from the northern field, shot, and wounded by Baldwin-Felts detectives as he escaped through the back door of a boarding house in Lafayette, Colorado, in January 1910.

At the eve of the First Balkan War in 1912, he sought to travel to Greece in order to join the Greek Army. However, he could not do so because of family duties. One historian describes Tikas' attitude as "grinding his teeth" for being unable to go back to Greece. By the end of 1912, he was an organizer for the United Mine Workers of America.

He was shot and killed during the Ludlow Massacre, the bloodiest event of the strike, on April 20, 1914, the day after (Greek Orthodox) Easter. Nineteen people were killed during the massacre, including two women and eleven children and one National Guardsman.

Tikas met with Major Pat Hamrock on the day of the massacre in response to allegations of a man being held against his will in the camp. The militia placed machine guns on the hills and Tikas, anticipating trouble, ran back to camp. But fighting broke out, lasting all day. By 7:00 pm, the camp was aflame. Tikas remained in the camp the entire day and was there when the fire started. Lieutenant Karl Linderfelt, an opponent of Tikas' during much of the strike, broke the butt of his rifle over Tikas' head. Tikas was later found shot to death, one bullet through his back, another in his hip, a third glancing off his hip and traveling vertically through his body; it was determined that he bled to death. The film Palikari honors his death.

A statue of Louis Tikas was dedicated at the Miner's Memorial on Main Street in Trinidad, Colorado on June 23, 2018.

== Ludlow Massacre ==
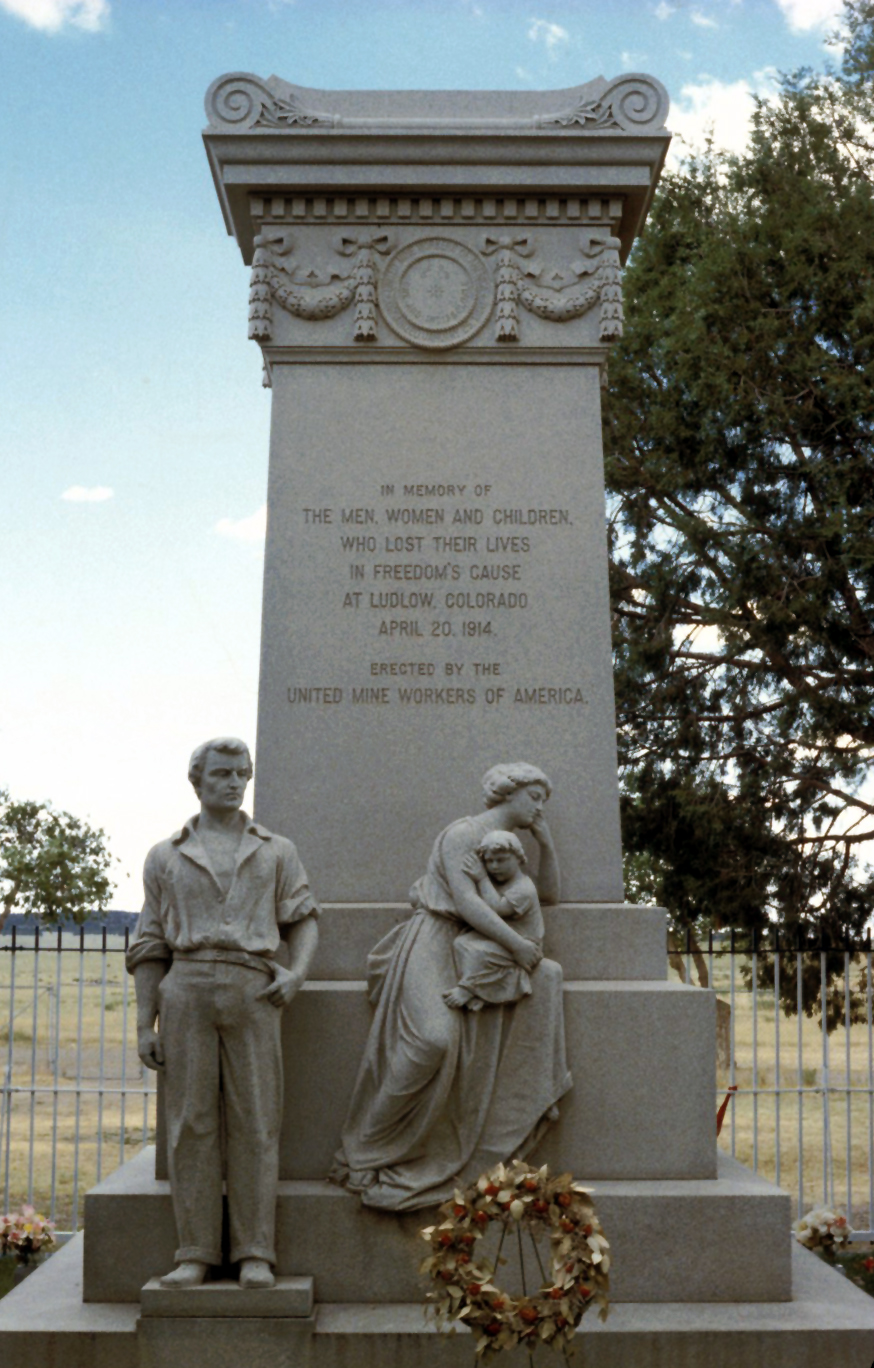
The Ludlow Monument, which was erected by the United Mine Workers of America; a statue of Louis Tikas can be seen on the left.

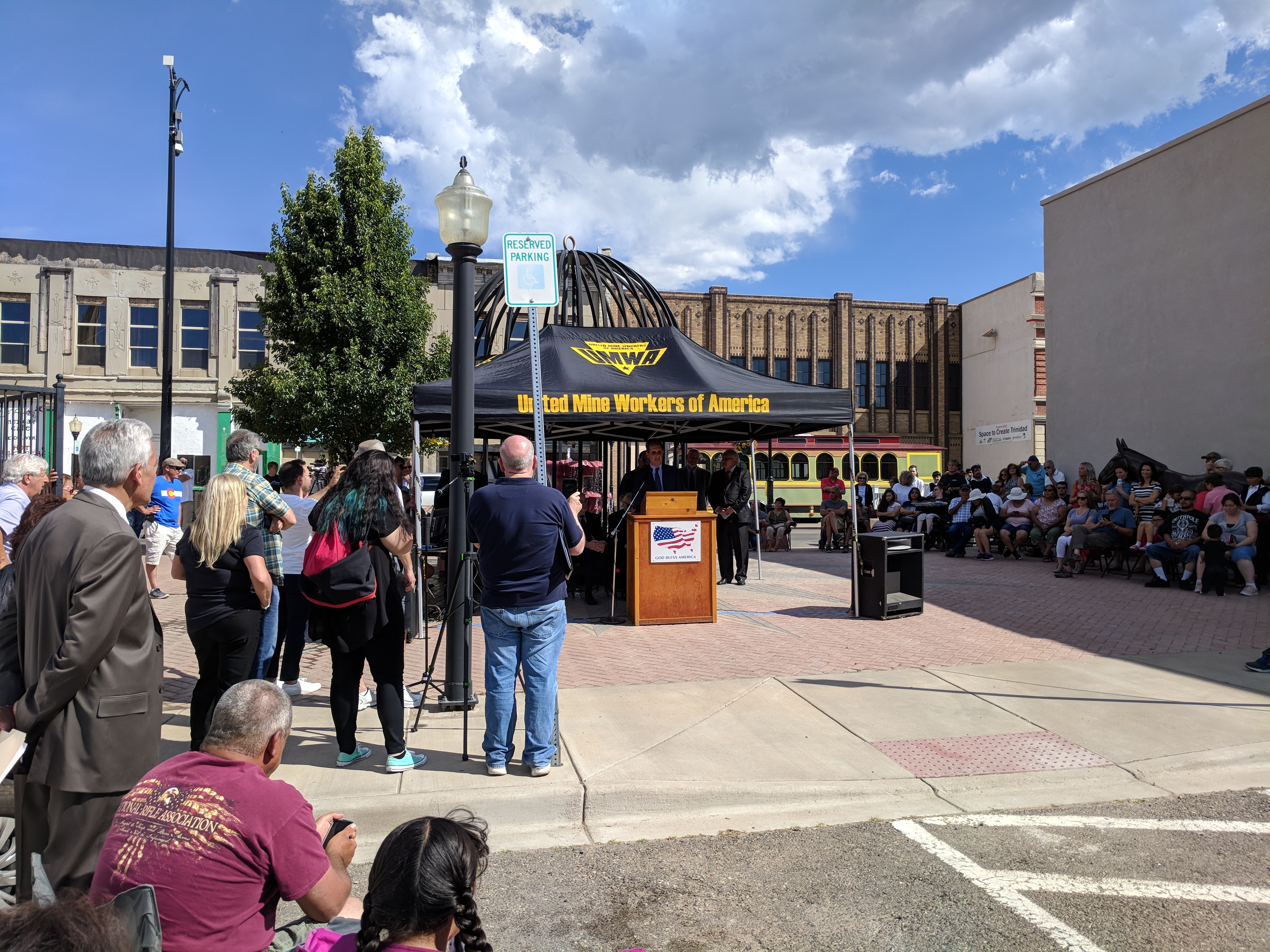
Ceremony dedicating the Tikas Bronze in Trinidad, Colorado on 23 June 2018.

On 20 April 1914, while Tikas was meeting with Major Patrick J. Hamrock, the militia commander in charge of Company B, troopers—as instructed by superiors—located themselves atop Water Tank Hill, just south of Ludlow in response to spotting armed Greek miners milling about. Many armed colonists spotted the militiamen and moved to key points where they could closely watch activities atop the small hill. Other colonists feared something was awry and scurried about for cover. Suddenly the sound of rifle fire echoed through the nearby hills. Neither the militia nor the colonists knew who fired these shots, but an exchange of gunfire began, as both confused colonists and militiamen believed they were coming under attack.

The militia were badly outnumbered by the colonists, but had certain advantages, including a choice location and a machine gun. The spray from the gun drove armed strikers back toward the tents, and provided excellent coverage for guardsmen advancing toward the tents. Meanwhile, Company A reinforcements, along with Lt. Karl Linderfelt, arrived with another machine gun to offer support to Company B. The colonists now faced two automatic weapons and about 150 guardsmen. Machine gun and rifle fire forced women and children colonists to take refuge in storage cellars beneath the tents. This offered some protection but advancing guardsmen eventually forced the cellars' occupants to abandon the underground shelters and to evacuate to the east of the colony site to some hills locally called the "Black Hills" for protection. By late afternoon, it was clear that the militia would overrun the colony site, and everyone would have to abandon the site and join those who had already fled to the Black Hills. Meanwhile, a deserted tent burst into flames and, within a short time, more tents began to burn. At the same time, the militiamen overran and took command of the colony site.

By early morning, 21 April 1914, the colony site––previously covered by hundreds of tents––revealed nothing more than charred rubble remains of the tents. The bodies of two women and eleven children––victims of asphyxiation––were found huddled within a cellar. Five strikers, two other youngsters, and at least four men associated with the militia also died. Though the Ludlow battle ended on the night of 20 April 1914, sporadic violence continued for days after. Battles that took place at various coal camps claimed many more lives. In late April, federal troops moved into southern Colorado, almost immediately restoring peace. The strike, however, continued through early December, finally coming to an end without resolution. Despite the heavy loss of lives and property, the strikers' efforts and losses weren't entirely in vain. The effects of the strike and the violence encouraged state and federal lawmakers to pass legislation that, in the long run, would help hasten improvements in conditions for working miners.

The Ludlow Monument, erected by the United Mine Workers of America a couple years after the massacre, stands near the site to commemorate the dead strikers and their families.

== See also ==
- Murder of workers in labor disputes in the United States

== Sources ==
- Debs, Eugene V. "Louis Tikas: Ludlow's Hero and Martyr", Labor & Freedom (St. Louis, 1916), pp. 33–37. Originally published in Appeal to Reason (4 September 1915). Retrieved 5 May 2014.
- Papanikolas, Zeese (1982). Buried Unsung: Louis Tikas and the Ludlow Massacre. University of Nebraska Press (published 1991). ISBN 978-0-8032-8727-3.
