= Ludlow, Colorado =

Ghost town in Las Animas County, Colorado, United States

Ludlow
- Ghost town
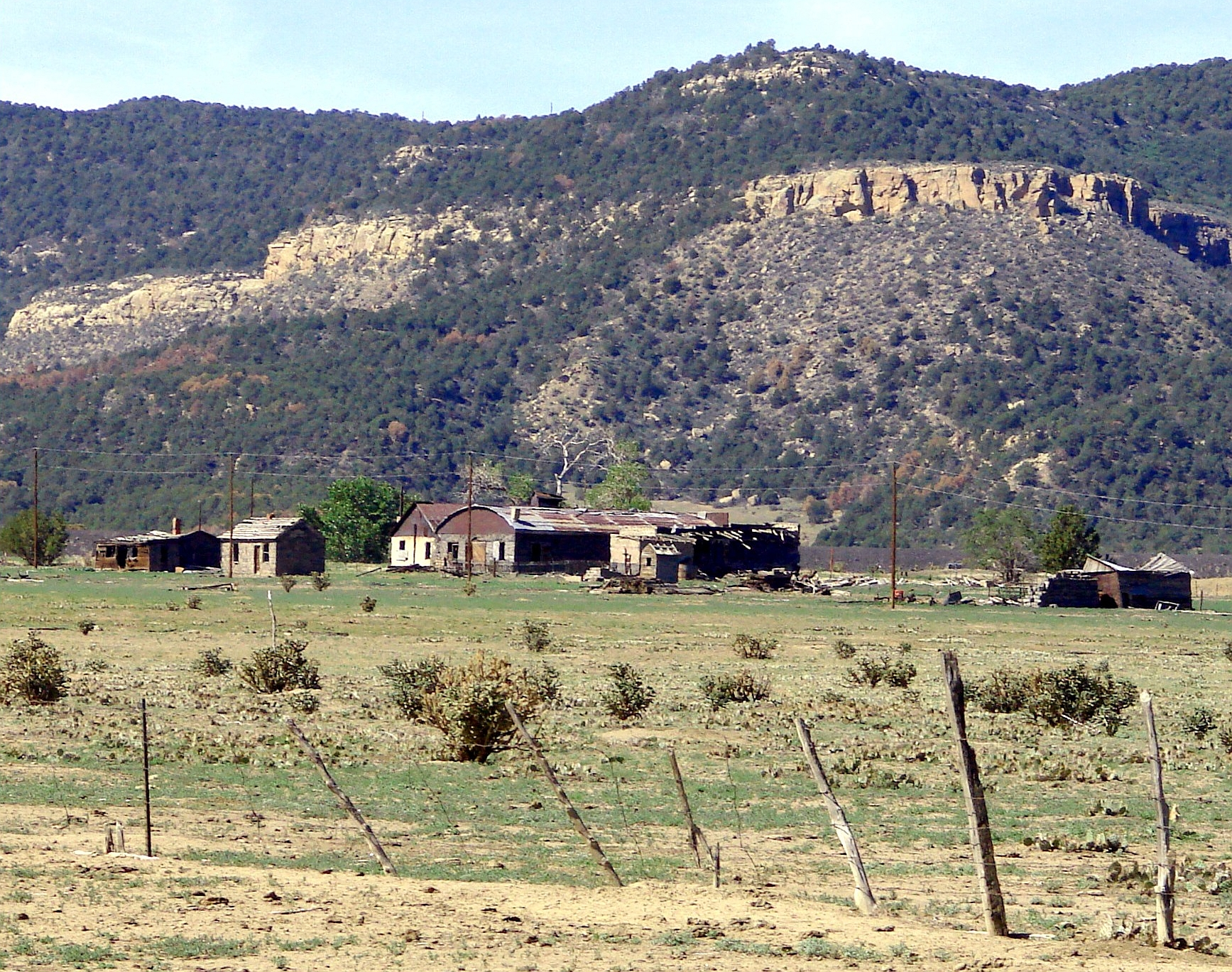
- Ludlow in 2013

- Location within the state of Colorado
- Coordinates: 37°20′00″N 104°34′59″W
- Country: United States
- State: Colorado
- County: Las Animas
- Elevation: 6,283 ft (1,915 m)
- Time zone: UTC-7 (Mountain (MST))
  - Summer (DST): UTC-6 (MDT)
- ZIP codes: 81055
- GNIS feature ID: 194575

Ludlow is a ghost town in Las Animas County, Colorado, United States. It was the site of the Ludlow Massacre–part of the Colorado Coalfield War–in 1914. The town site is located at the entrance to a canyon in the foothills of the Sangre de Cristo Mountains. It is located along the western side of Interstate 25 approximately 12 miles (19 km) north of the town of Trinidad. Nearby points of interest include the Ludlow Monument, a monument to the coal miners and their families who were killed in the 1914 massacre, the Hastings coke ovens, and the Victor American Hastings Mine Disaster Monument.

Robert Adams made a series of photographs in Ludlow in 1981. In June 2009, the Ludlow Tent Colony Site was dedicated as a National Historic Landmark by Department of the Interior in a ceremony attended by Governor Bill Ritter following approval in January of that year.

== History ==
A road and standard-gauge railroad was built through Ludlow in 1888 by the Denver, Texas, and Fort Worth Railroad, which would later become the Colorado & Southern.

=== Ludlow Massacre ===
On 20 April 1914, after months of sporadic violence and the withdrawal of a larger contingent of troops a few days before, Colorado National Guardsmen and local militia fired on strikers participating in the United Mine Workers of America strike against the Rockefeller-owned Colorado Fuel and Iron company. Roughly 20 occupants of the colony, including at least 12 women and children, were killed — mostly by smoke inhalation in the ensuing conflagration. Also among the dead was Greek labor-organizer Louis Tikas. A single Guardsman is known to have been killed by gunfire from the strikers. The violence at Ludlow sparked the most intense period of violence of the Colorado Coalfield War, which lasted until President Woodrow Wilson ordered troops into Colorado to end the fighting on 29 April.

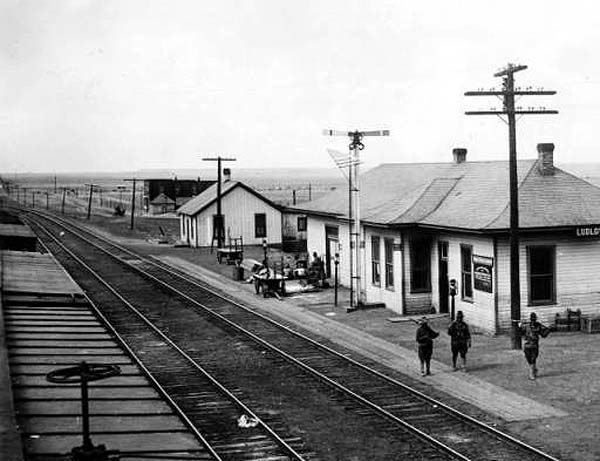
Militiamen near the Colorado & Southern railway station in Ludlow, Colorado in 1913 during the early stages of the Colorado Coalfield War.

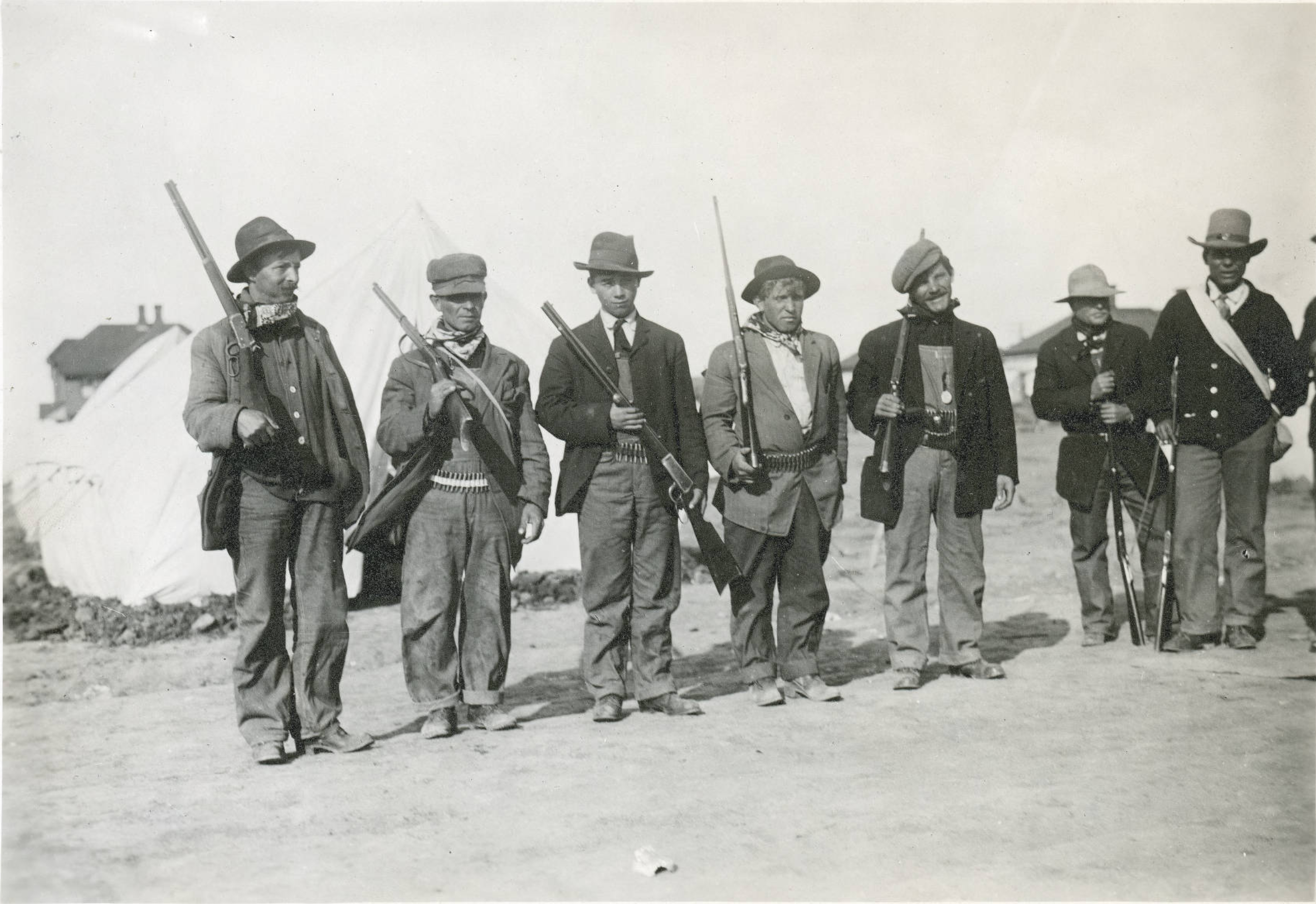
Armed strikers at the Ludlow tent colony during the Colorado Coalfield War.
