= Hastings mine explosion =

1917 disaster in Colorado, US

Coordinates: 37°20′0″N 104°36′0″W

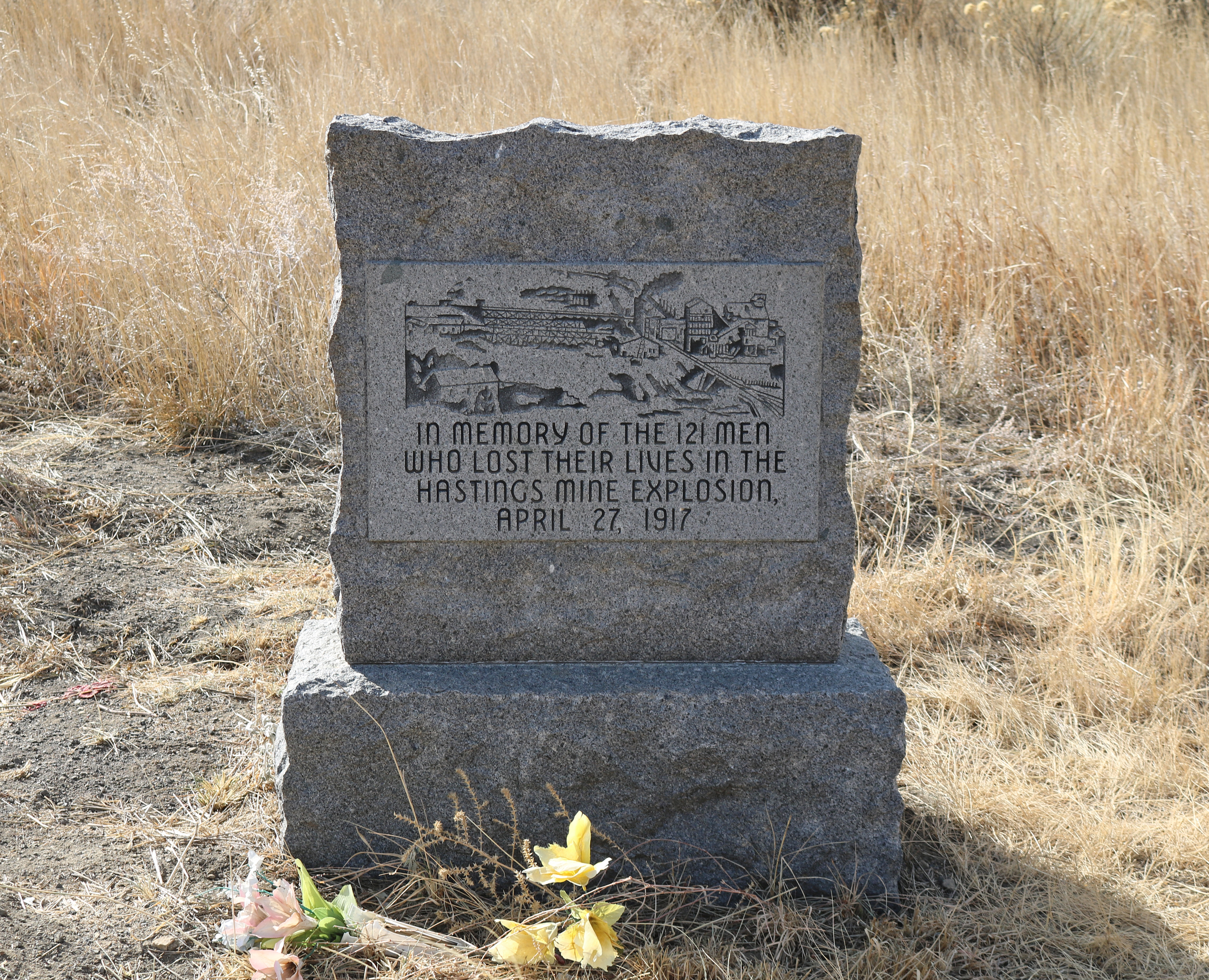
The monument in 2021

The Hastings mine explosion was a fire at the Victor-American Fuel Company coal mine in Hastings, Las Animas County, Colorado, on April 27, 1917, in which 121 people died. A small monument marks the location, on County Road 44, about 1.5 km west of the Ludlow Monument, which commemorates those who died in a massacre during the Colorado Coalfield War. In June 1912, twelve miners were killed in an explosion at the same mine.

== Cause ==
A coroner's jury found that Hastings mine inspector David Reese caused the explosion when, deep in the mine, he opened his oil-burning, key-lock safety lamp (which generated light by burning the oil on a wick) to attempt to re-light it. Reese's body was found with matches in his pants pocket, a violation of mine-safety laws.
