= Ludlow Massacre =

April 1914 massacre during the Colorado Coalfield War

- Part of Colorado Coalfield War
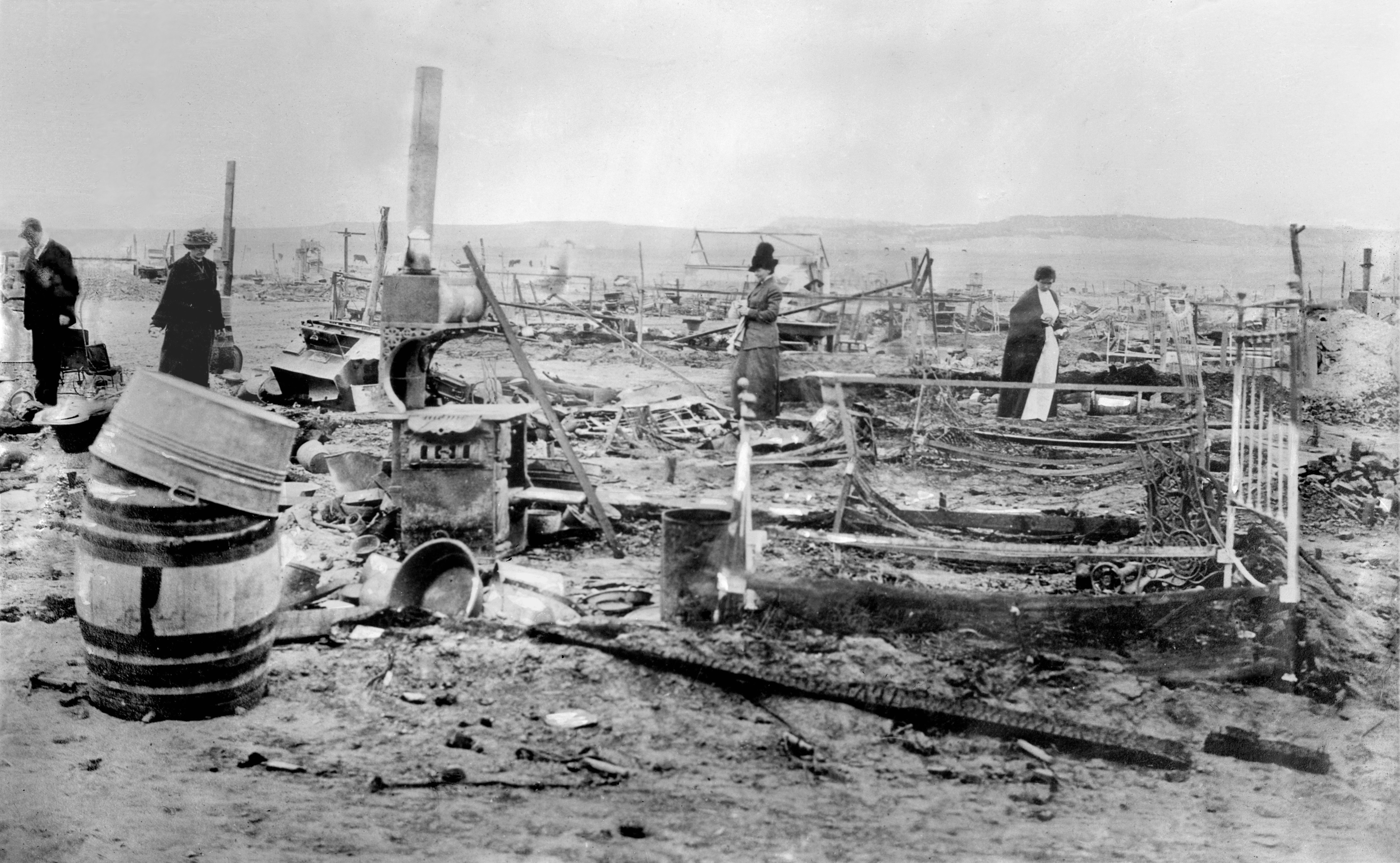
- Ruins of the Ludlow Colony following the massacre
- Date: April 20, 1914
- Location: Ludlow, Colorado, U.S. 37°20′21″N 104°35′02″W
- Methods: Machine guns, fire
- Result: Tent colony burned, Tikas and roughly 20 other residents killed. Ten days of increased fighting followed by federal military intervention.

Parties
United Mine Workers of America (UMWA)	Colorado Fuel and Iron Company; Colorado National Guard; Hired Strikebreakers

Lead figures
Louis Tikas (Organizer, UMWA) †; James Fyler (Financial Secretary, UMWA); John R. Lawson	Karl Linderfelt; Patrick J. Hamrock; Gen. John Chase; John D. Rockefeller Jr.

Casualties and losses
Deaths: Contemporary reports: 20 (12 children, 8 adults), including 1 bystander Modern estimate: at least 19 (12 children and 2 women) and at least 5 strikers, including Tikas	Deaths: Contemporary reports: 3 or 4 Modern estimate: 1

The Ludlow Massacre was a mass killing perpetrated by anti-striker militia during the Colorado Coalfield War. Soldiers from the Colorado National Guard and private guards employed by Colorado Fuel and Iron Company (CF&I) attacked a tent colony of roughly 1,200 striking coal miners and their families in Ludlow, Colorado, on April 20, 1914. Approximately 21 people were killed, primarily miners' wives and children. John D. Rockefeller Jr. was a part-owner of CF&I who had recently appeared before a United States congressional hearing on the strikes, and he was widely blamed for having orchestrated the massacre.

The massacre was the seminal event of the 1913–1914 Colorado Coalfield War, which began with a general United Mine Workers of America strike against poor labor conditions in CF&I's southern Colorado coal mines. The strike was organized by miners working for the Rocky Mountain Fuel Company and Victor-American Fuel Company. Ludlow was the deadliest single incident during the Colorado Coalfield War and spurred a ten-day period of heightened violence throughout Colorado. In retaliation for the massacre at Ludlow, bands of armed miners attacked dozens of anti-union establishments, destroying property and engaging in several skirmishes with the Colorado National Guard along a 225-mile (362 km) front from Trinidad to Louisville. From the strike's beginning in September 1913 to intervention by federal soldiers under President Woodrow Wilson's orders on April 29, 1914, an estimated 69 to 199 people were killed. Historian Thomas G. Andrews declared it the "deadliest strike in the history of the United States."

The Ludlow Massacre was a watershed moment in American labor relations. Historian and author Howard Zinn described it as "the culminating act of perhaps the most violent struggle between corporate power and laboring men in American history". Congress responded to public outrage by directing the House Committee on Mines and Mining to investigate the events. Its report, published in 1915, was influential in promoting child labor laws and an eight-hour work day. The Ludlow townsite and the adjacent location of the tent colony, 18 miles (29 km) northwest of Trinidad, Colorado, is now a ghost town. The massacre site is owned by the United Mine Workers of America, which erected a granite monument in memory of those who died that day. The Ludlow tent colony site was designated a National Historic Landmark on January 16, 2009, and dedicated on June 28, 2009. Subsequent investigations immediately following the massacre and modern archeological efforts largely support some of the strikers' accounts of the event.

== Background ==
The Ludlow tent colony prior to the massacre. The caption reads: "Ludlow, a canvas community of 900 souls, was riddled with machine guns shooting 400 bullets a minute. Then the tents were burned. The site is private property leased by the miners' union, which has supported the colony seven months."

Areas of the Rocky Mountains have veins of coal near the surface, providing significant and relatively accessible reserves. In 1867, these coal deposits caught the attention of William Jackson Palmer, then leading a survey team planning the route of the Kansas Pacific Railway. The rapid expansion of rail transport in the United States made coal a highly valued commodity, and it was rapidly commercialized.

At its peak in 1910, the coal mining industry of Colorado employed 15,864 people, 10% of jobs in the state. Colorado's coal industry was dominated by a handful of operators. Colorado Fuel and Iron was the largest coal operator in the west and one of the nation's most powerful corporations, at one point employing 7,050 people and controlling 71,837 acres (290.71 km^{2}) of coal land. John D. Rockefeller purchased a controlling stake in the Colorado Fuel & Iron Company in 1902, and nine years later he turned over his controlling interest in the company to his son, John D. Rockefeller Jr., who managed the company from his offices at 26 Broadway in New York.

Mining was dangerous and difficult work. Colliers in Colorado were constantly threatened by explosions, suffocation, and collapsing mine walls. In 1912, the death rate in Colorado's mines was 7.06 per 1,000 employees, compared to a national rate of 3.15. In 1914, the United States House Committee on Mines and Mining reported:

Colorado has good mining laws and such that ought to afford protection to the miners as to safety in the mine if they were enforced, yet in this State the percentage of fatalities is larger than any other, showing there is undoubtedly something wrong in reference to the management of its coal mines.

Miners were generally paid according to tonnage of coal produced, but so-called "dead work", such as shoring up unstable roofs, was often unpaid. The tonnage system drove many poor and ambitious colliers to gamble with their lives by neglecting precautions and taking on risk, often with fatal consequences. Between 1884 and 1912, mining accidents killed more than 1,700 in Colorado. In 1913 alone, 110 men died in mine-related accidents.

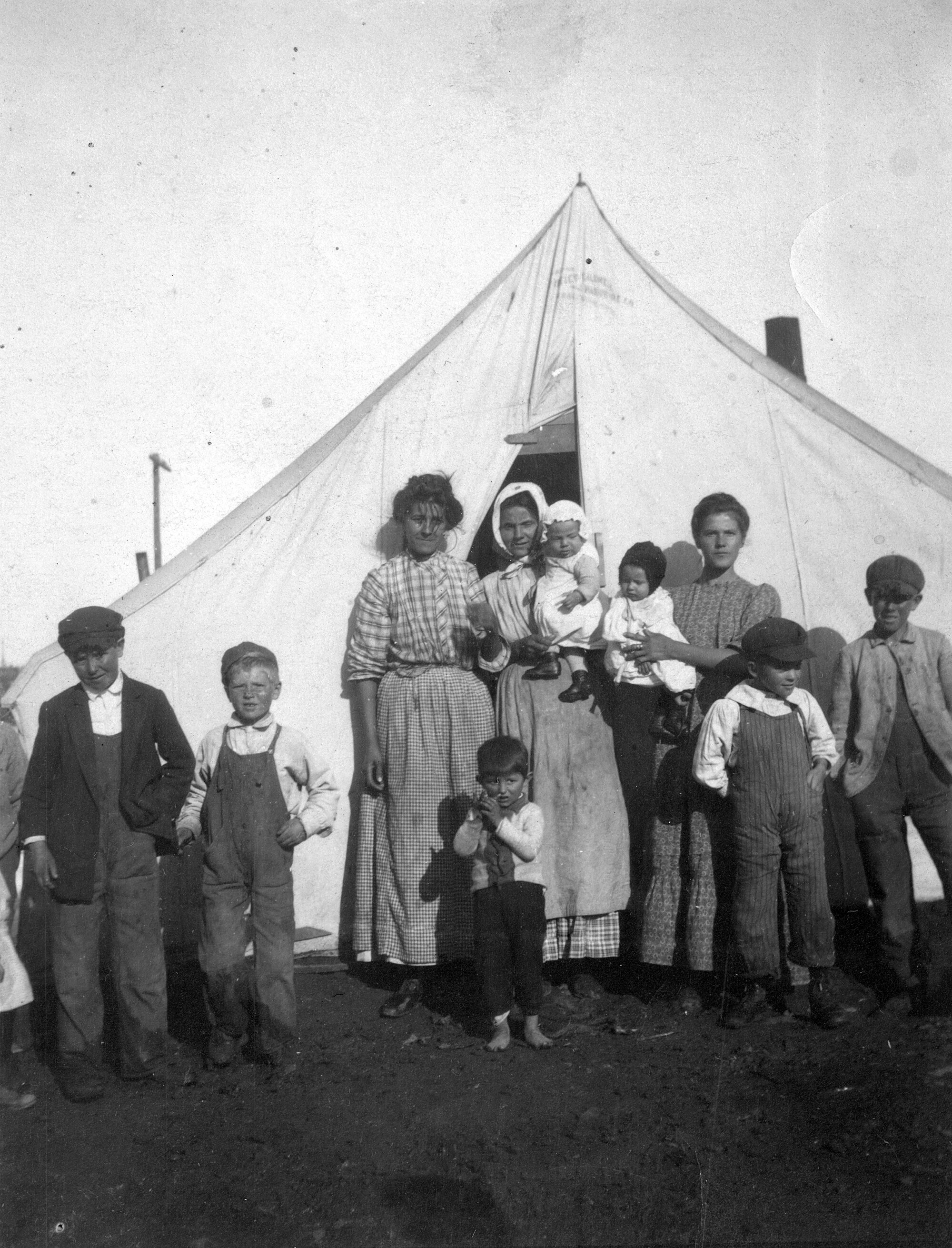
Three women, wives of striking coal miners, and their children stand outside of a tent at the Ludlow colony.

Colliers had little opportunity to air their grievances. Many resided in company towns, in which all land, real estate, and amenities were owned by the mine operator, and which were expressly designed to inculcate loyalty and quell dissent. Welfare capitalists believed that anger and unrest among the workers could be placated by raising colliers' standard of living, while subsuming it under company management. Company towns indeed brought tangible improvements to many colliers' lives, including larger houses, better medical care, and broader access to education. But owning the towns gave companies considerable control over most aspects of workers' lives, and they did not always use this power to augment public welfare. Historian Philip S. Foner has described company towns as "feudal domain[s], with the company acting as lord and master. ... The 'law' consisted of the company rules. Curfews were imposed. Company guards—brutal thugs armed with machine guns and rifles loaded with soft-point bullets—would not admit any 'suspicious' stranger into the camp and would not permit any miner to leave." Miners who came into conflict with the company were often summarily evicted from their homes.

Frustrated by working conditions they found unsafe and unjust, colliers increasingly turned to unions. Nationwide, organized mines boasted 40% fewer fatalities than nonunion mines. Colorado miners repeatedly attempted to unionize after the state's first strike in 1883. The Western Federation of Miners organized primarily hard-rock miners in the gold and silver camps during the 1890s.

Beginning in 1900, the United Mine Workers of America began organizing coal miners in the Western states, including southern Colorado. The union decided to focus on the Colorado Fuel & Iron Company because of its harsh management tactics under the conservative and distant Rockefellers and other investors. To break or prevent strikes, the coal companies hired strikebreakers, mainly from Mexico and Southern and Eastern Europe. The Colorado Fuel & Iron Company mixed immigrants of different nationalities in the mines to discourage communication that might lead to organization.

== Strike ==
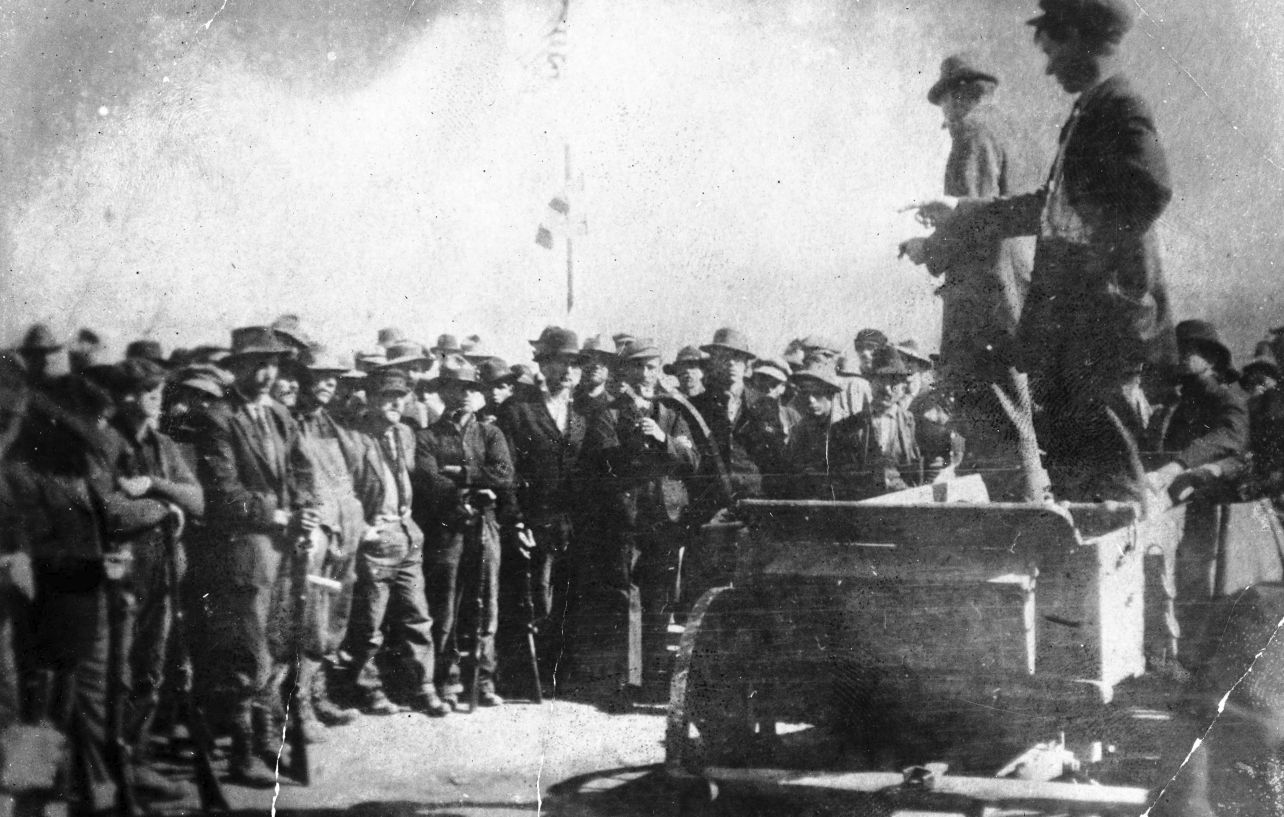
Speakers at the Ludlow strike stand in an open top car and rally the striking workers.

Suffering attempts to suppress union activity, the United Mine Workers of America secretly continued its unionization efforts in the years leading up to 1913. Eventually, the union presented a list of seven demands:

1. Recognition of the union as bargaining agent
2. Compensation for digging coal at a ton rate based on 2,000 pounds (previous ton rates were of long tons of 2,200 pounds)
3. Enforcement of the eight-hour workday law
4. Payment for "dead work" (laying track, timbering, handling impurities, etc.)
5. Weight checkmen elected by the workers (to keep company weightmen honest)
6. Right to use any store, and to choose their boarding houses and doctors
7. Strict enforcement of Colorado's laws (such as mine safety rules, abolition of scrip), and an end to the company guard system

The major coal companies rejected the demands. In September 1913, the United Mine Workers of America called a strike. Those who went on strike were evicted from their company homes and moved to tent villages prepared by the union. The tents were built on wood platforms and furnished with cast-iron stoves on land the union had leased in preparation for a strike.

Baldwin–Felts armored car known as the "Death Special" with mounted M1895 machine gun.

When leasing the sites, the union had selected locations near the mouths of canyons that led to the coal camps in order to block any strikebreakers' traffic. The company hired the Baldwin–Felts Detective Agency to protect the new workers and harass the strikers.

Baldwin–Felts had a reputation for aggressive strikebreaking. Agents shone searchlights on the tent villages at night and fired bullets into the tents at random, occasionally killing and maiming people. They used an improvised armored car, mounted with a machine gun the union called the "Death Special", to patrol the camp's perimeters. The steel-covered car was built at the Colorado Fuel & Iron Company plant in Pueblo, Colorado, from the chassis of a large touring sedan. Confrontations between striking miners and working miners, whom the union called scabs, sometimes resulted in deaths. Frequent sniper attacks on the tent colonies drove the miners to dig pits beneath the tents to hide in. Armed battles also occurred between (mostly Greek) strikers and sheriffs recently deputized to suppress the strike: this was the Colorado Coalfield War.

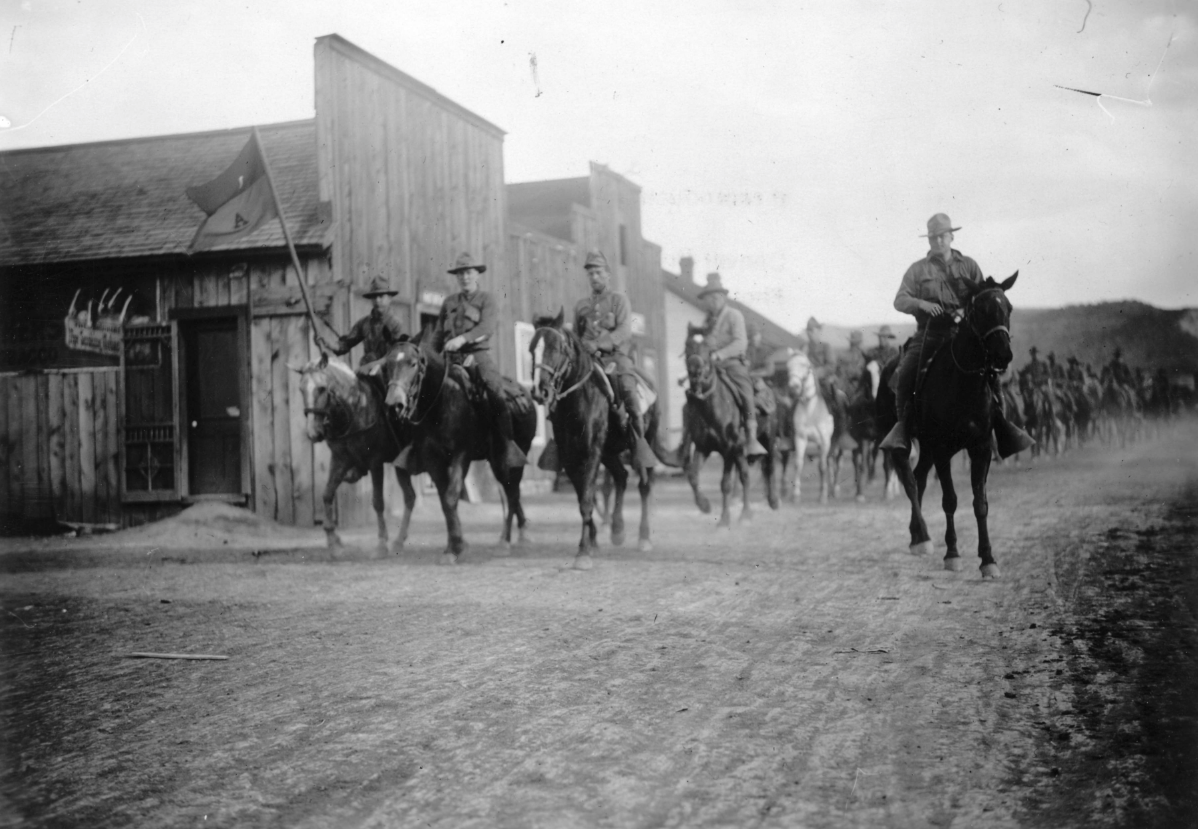
Lt. Karl Linderfelt and the Colorado state militia, ride in on horseback to suppress the strike.

As strike-related violence mounted, Colorado governor Elias M. Ammons called in the Colorado National Guard on October 28. At first, the Guard's appearance calmed the situation, but the Guard leaders' sympathies lay with company management. Guard Adjutant-General John Chase, who had served during the violent Cripple Creek strike 10 years earlier, imposed a harsh regime. On March 10, 1914, a replacement worker's body was found on the railroad tracks near Forbes, Colorado. The National Guard said the strikers had murdered the man. In retaliation, Chase ordered the Forbes tent colony destroyed. The attack was launched while the residents were attending a funeral of two infants who had died a few days earlier. Photographer Lou Dold witnessed the attack, and his images of the destruction often appear in accounts of the strike.

The strikers persevered until the spring of 1914. By then, according to historian Anthony DeStefanis, the National Guard had largely broken the strike by helping the mine operators bring in nonunion workers. The state had also run out of money to maintain the Guard, and Ammons decided to recall them. He and the mining companies, fearing a breakdown in order, left one company of Guardsmen in southern Colorado. They formed a new company called "Troop A", which consisted largely of Colorado Fuel & Iron Company mine camp guards and mine guards hired by Baldwin–Felts, who were given National Guard uniforms.

== Massacre ==
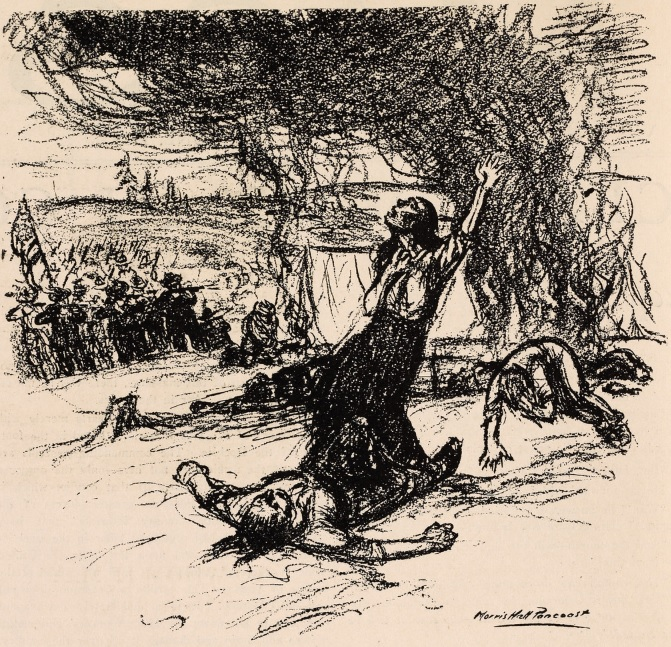
In a sketch of the massacre from 1914, by Morris Hall Pancoast, a woman gasps for air while tents burn and Colorado state militiamen fire their rifles.

On the morning of April 20, the day after some in the tent colony celebrated Orthodox Easter, three Guardsmen appeared at the camp ordering the release of a man they claimed was being held against his will. The camp leader, Louis Tikas, left to meet with Major Patrick J. Hamrock at the train station in Ludlow village, 1/2 mile (800 m) from the colony. While this meeting was progressing, two militias installed a machine gun on a ridge near the camp and took positions along a rail route about half a mile south of Ludlow. Simultaneously, armed Greek miners began flanking to an arroyo. When two of the militias' dynamite explosions – detonated to draw support from the National Guard units at Berwind and Cedar Hill – alerted the Ludlow tent colony, the miners took up positions at the bottom of the hill. When the militia opened fire, hundreds of miners and their families ran for cover.

The fighting raged for the entire day. The militia was reinforced by non-uniformed mine guards later in the afternoon. At dusk, a passing freight train stopped on the tracks in front of the Guards' machine-gun placements, allowing many of the miners and their families to escape to an outcrop of hills to the east called the Black Hills. By 7 p.m., the camp was in flames, and the militia descended on it and began to search and loot it. Tikas had remained in the camp the entire day and was still there when the fire started. He and two other men were captured by the militia. Tikas and Lt. Karl Linderfelt, commander of one of two Guard companies, had confronted each other several times in the previous months. While two militiamen held Tikas, Linderfelt broke a rifle butt over his head. Tikas and the other two captured miners were later found shot dead. Tikas had been shot in the back. Their bodies lay along the Colorado and Southern Railway tracks for three days in full view of passing trains. The militia officers refused to allow them to be moved until a local of a railway union demanded they be taken away for burial.

During the battle, four women and 11 children hid in a pit beneath one tent, where they were trapped when the tent above them was set on fire. Two of the women and all the children suffocated. These deaths became a rallying cry for the United Mine Workers of America, who called the incident the Ludlow Massacre.

Julia May Courtney reported different numbers in her contemporaneous article "Remember Ludlow!" for the magazine Mother Earth. She said that, in addition to men who were killed, a total of 55 women and children had died in the massacre. According to her account, the militia:

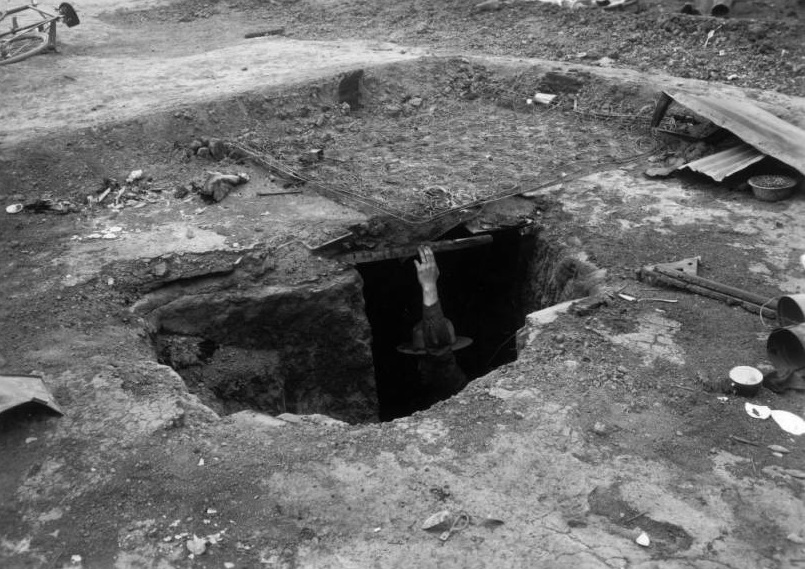
Underground shelter in which women and children died during a fire set by the Colorado National Guard.

fired the two largest buildings—the strikers' stores—and going from tent to tent, poured oil on the flimsy structures, setting fire to them. From the blazing tents rushed the women and children, only to be beaten back into the fire by the rain of bullets from the militia. The men rushed to the assistance of their families; and as they did so, they were dropped as the whirring messengers of death sped surely to the mark ... into the cellars—the pits of hell under their blazing tents—crept the women and children, less fearful of the smoke and flames than of the nameless horror of the spitting bullets. One man counted the bodies of nine little children, taken from one ashy pit, their tiny fingers burned away as they held to the edge in their struggle to escape ... thugs in State uniform hacked at the lifeless forms, in some instances nearly cutting off heads and limbs to show their contempt for the strikers. Fifty-five women and children perished in the fire of the Ludlow tent colony. Relief parties carrying the Red Cross flag were driven back by the gunmen, and for twenty-four hours the bodies lay crisping in the ashes, while rescuers vainly tried to cross the firing line.

Some reports say a second machine gun was brought in to support the estimated 200 Guardsmen who participated in the engagement, and that a Colorado and Southern train's operators purposely put their engine between a machine gun and the strikers as a shield against National Guard fire.

A board of Colorado military officers described the events as beginning with the killing of Tikas and other strikers in custody, with gunfire largely emanating from the southwestern corner of the Ludlow Colony. Guardsmen stationed on "Water Tank Hill"—the name for the machine gun position—fired into the camp. The Guardsmen reported having seen women and children withdrawing the morning before the battle and said they thought the strikers would not have begun firing if they had women still with them. The board's official report commended the "truly heroic behavior" of Linderfelt, the guardsmen, and the militia during the battle and blamed the strikers for any civilian casualties during the engagement, despite those killed being family members of the strikers. The report also blamed the looting that occurred afterward on "Troop 'A'", a unit composed largely of non-uniformed mine guards who had been integrated into the Guard.

In addition to the miners and their family members, three regular members of the National Guard and one other militiaman were reported killed in the day's fighting by contemporary accounts. However, modern historians assert that only one of the militia's number, a private named Martin of the National Guard, was killed. Martin was fatally shot in the neck, presumably by strikers.

== Aftermath ==
In the aftermath of the massacre came the Ten Days War, part of the wider Colorado Coalfield War. As news of the deaths of women and children spread, the leaders of organized labor issued a call to arms. They urged union members to get "all the arms and ammunition legally available". Subsequently, the coal miners began a large-scale guerrilla war against the mine guards and facilities throughout Colorado's southern coalfields. In the town of Trinidad, the United Mine Workers of America openly and officially distributed arms and ammunition to strikers at union headquarters.

Over the next ten days, 700 to 1,000 strikers "attacked mine after mine, driving off or killing the guards and setting fire to the buildings." At least 50 people, including those at Ludlow, were killed during the ten days of fighting between the guards and miners. Hundreds of state militia reinforcements were rushed to the coalfields to regain control of the situation. The fighting ended only after President Woodrow Wilson sent in federal troops. The troops disarmed both sides, displacing and often arresting the militia in the process. The Colorado Coalfield War produced a total death toll of approximately 75.

The United Mine Workers of America finally ran out of money, and called off the strike on December 10, 1914. In the end, the strikers' demands were not met, the union did not get recognition, and many striking workers were replaced. 408 strikers were arrested, 332 of whom were indicted for murder.

Of those present at Ludlow during the massacre, only John R. Lawson, leader of the strike, was convicted of murder, and the Colorado Supreme Court eventually overturned the conviction. Twenty-two National Guardsmen, including 10 officers, were court-martialed. While Linderfelt was found responsible for the deaths of Tikas and other strikers that exhibited execution-style injuries, he and all others were acquitted.

An Episcopalian minister, Reverend John O. Ferris, pastored Trinity Church in Trinidad and another church in Aguilar. He was one of the few pastors in Trinidad permitted to search and provide Christian burials to the deceased victims of the Ludlow Massacre.

== Victims ==
External videos
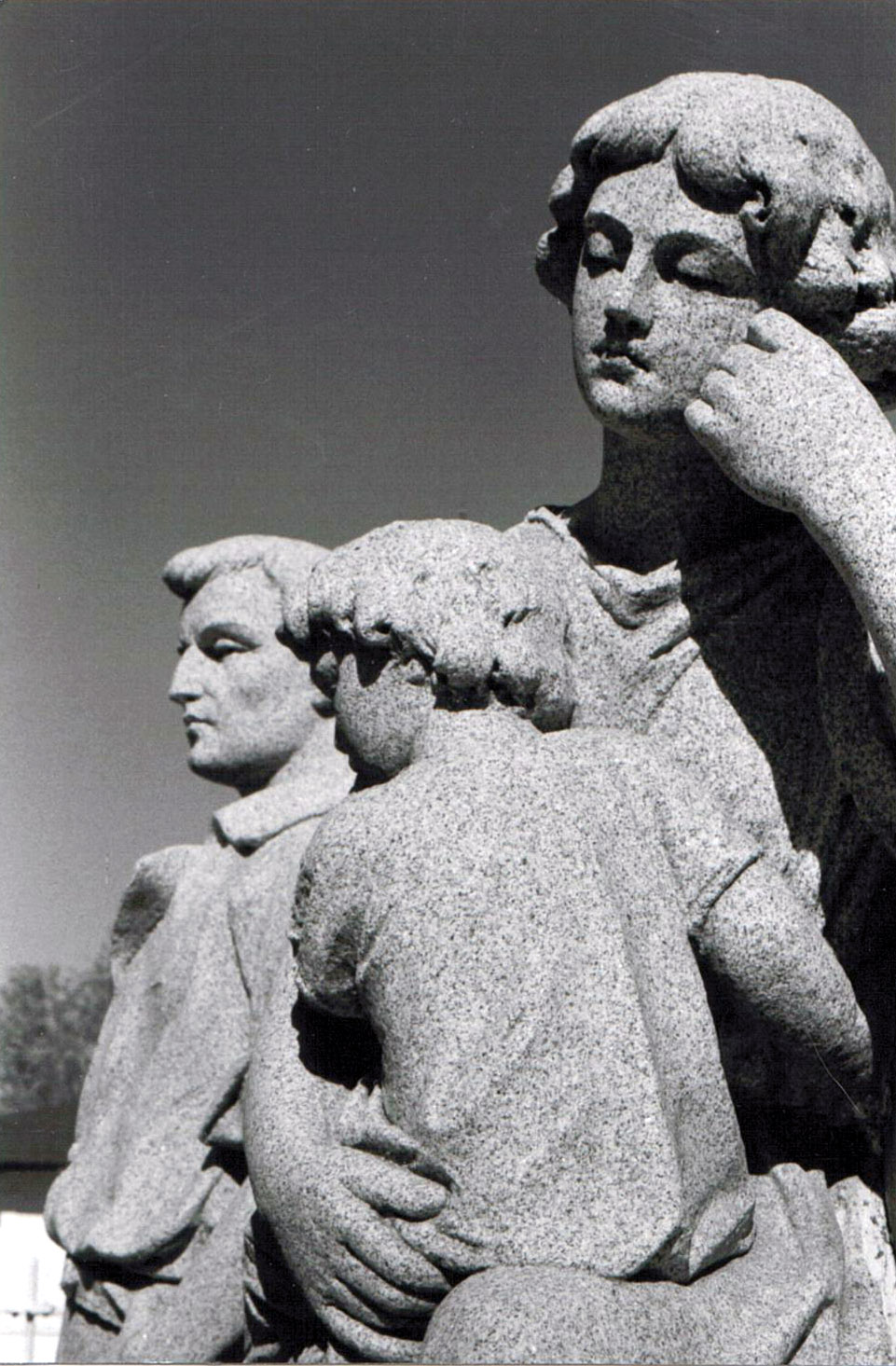
- Children of Ludlow , C-SPAN, 15:14

Name	Also reported as	Age (years)	Cause of death
Cardelima Costa	Fedelina/Cedilano Costa	27	asphyxiation, fire, or both
Charles Costa	Charlie Costa	31	shot
Cloriva Pedregone	Gloria/Clovine Pedregon[e]	4 months	asphyxiation, fire, or both
Elvira Valdez		3 months	asphyxiation, fire, or both
Eulala Valdez	Eulalia Valdez	8	asphyxiation, fire, or both
Frank Bartolotti	Frank Bartoloti/Bartalato	Unknown	shot
Frank Petrucci		6 months	asphyxiation, fire, or both
Frank Rubino		23	shot
Frank Snyder	William Snyder Jr.	11	shot
James Fyler		43	shot
Joseph "Joe" Petrucci		4	asphyxiation, fire, or both
Louis Tikas	Elias Anastasiou Spantidakis, Ηλίας Αναστασίου Σπαντιδάκης,	29	shot
Lucy Costa		4	asphyxiation, fire, or both
Lucy Petrucci		2.5	asphyxiation, fire, or both
Mary Valdez		7	asphyxiation, fire, or both
Onafrio Costa	Oragio Costa	6	asphyxiation, fire, or both
Patria Valdez	Patricia/Petra Valdez	37	asphyxiation, fire, or both
Primo Larese (bystander)	Presno Larce	Unknown	shot
Rodgerlo Pedregone	Roderlo/Rogaro Pedregon[e]	6	asphyxiation, fire, or both
Rudolph Valdez	Rodolso Valdez	9	asphyxiation, fire, or both

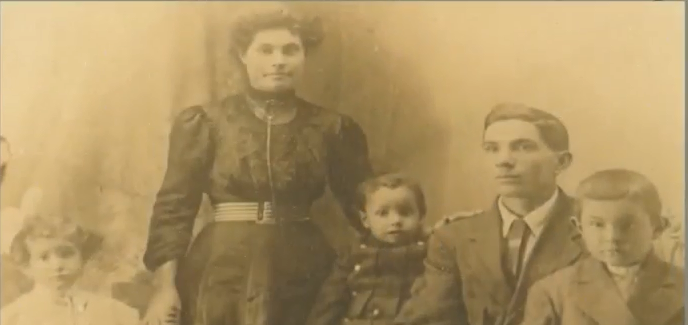
The Costa family, pictured before the Ludlow Massacre. Four members of this family were killed in the massacre, three by asphyxiation, fire, or both.

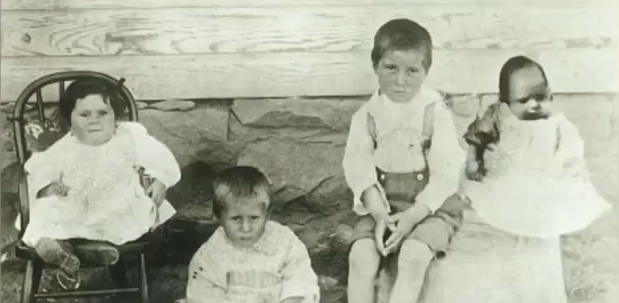
The children of the Petrucci family, all of whom died at the Ludlow Tent Colony.

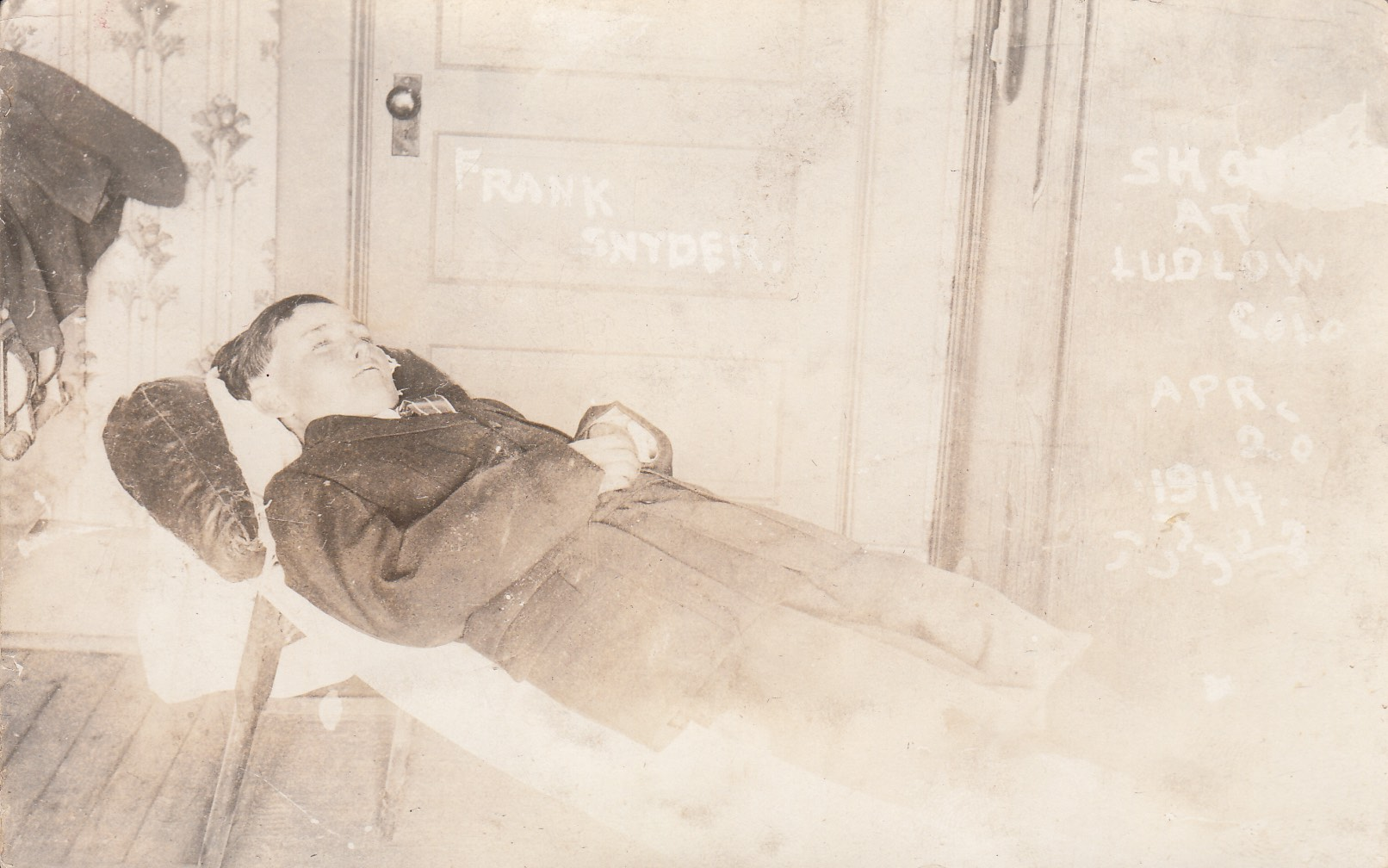
William "Frank" Snyder Jr. – Shot in his family's tent during the initial battle on 20 April 1914.

== Legacy ==
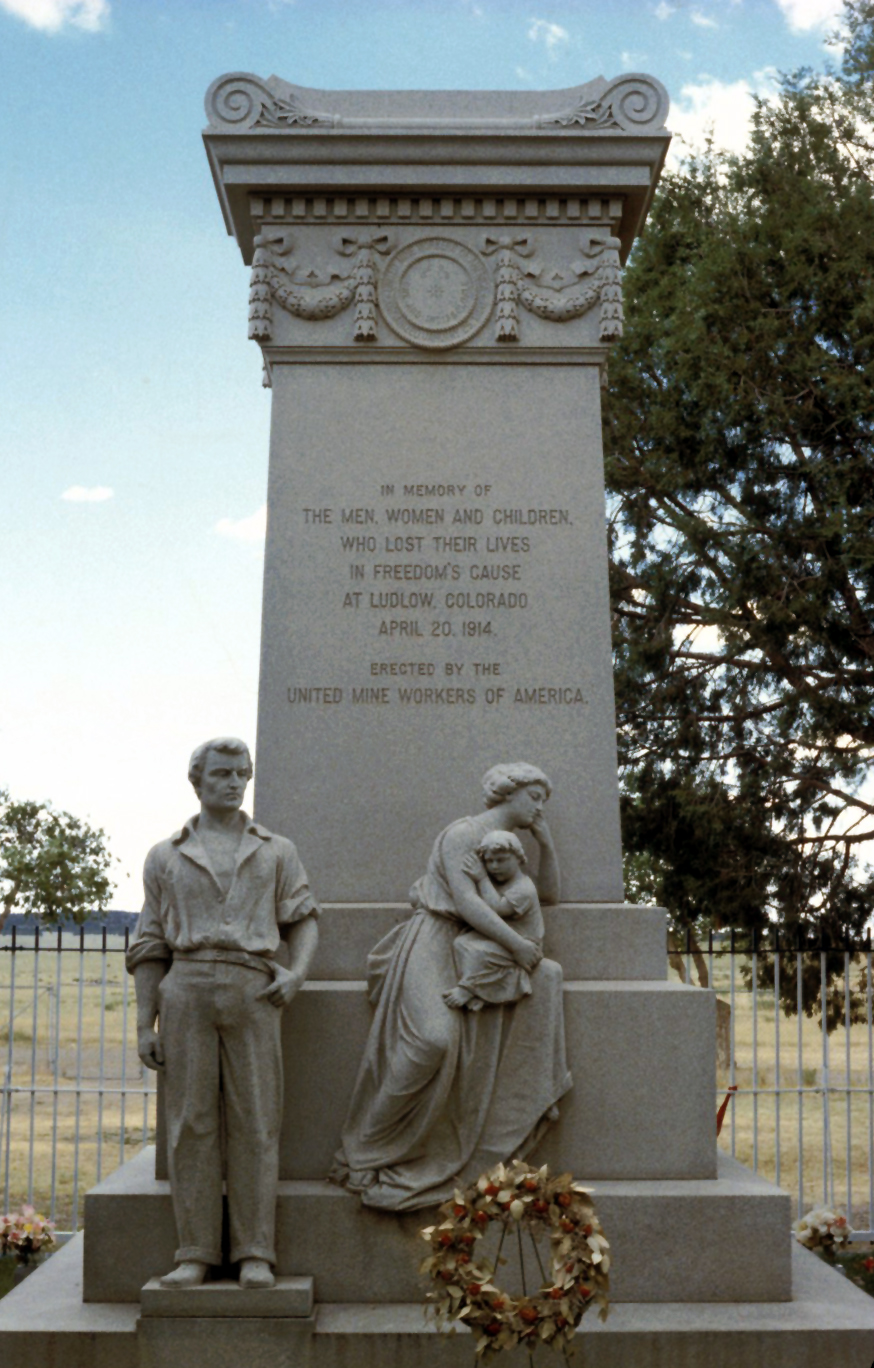
Ludlow Monument was erected by the United Mine Workers of America.

The massacre sparked nationwide reproach for the Rockefellers, especially in New York, where protesters demonstrated outside of the Rockefeller building in New York City. Protesters led by Ferrer Center anarchists Alexander Berkman and Carlo Tresca followed when Rockefeller Jr. fled 30 miles (48 km) upstate to the family estate near Tarrytown. In early July, a failed bomb plot on the Tarrytown estate ended with a dynamite explosion in East Harlem and three dead anarchists. The New York City Police Department inaugurated its bomb squad within a month. Bomb plots continued throughout the rest of the year.

Although the UMWA failed to win recognition from the company, the strike had a lasting effect both on conditions at the Colorado mines and on labor relations nationally. John D. Rockefeller Jr. engaged W. L. Mackenzie King, a labor relations expert and future Canadian Prime Minister, to help him develop reforms for the mines and towns. Improvements included paved roads and recreational facilities, as well as worker representation on committees dealing with working conditions, safety, health, and recreation. He prohibited discrimination against workers who had belonged to unions and ordered the establishment of a company union. The miners voted to accept the Rockefeller plan.

Rockefeller Jr. also brought in pioneer public relations expert Ivy Lee, who warned that the Rockefellers were losing public support and developed a strategy that Rockefeller followed to repair it. Rockefeller had to overcome his shyness, go to Colorado to meet the miners and their families, inspect the homes and the factories, attend social events, and listen closely to the grievances. This was novel advice, and attracted widespread media attention. The Rockefellers were able both to resolve the conflict, and present a more humanized version of their leaders.

Over time, Ludlow has assumed "a striking centrality in the interpretation of the nation's history developed by several of the most important left-leaning thinkers of the 20th century." Historian Howard Zinn wrote his master's thesis and several book chapters on Ludlow. George McGovern wrote his doctoral dissertation on the subject. In 1972, the same year as his U.S. presidential campaign, he published this dissertation with the help of historian Leonard Guttridge under the title The Great Coalfield War.

A United States Commission on Industrial Relations (CIR), headed by labor lawyer Frank Walsh, conducted hearings in Washington, D.C., collecting information and taking testimony from all the principals, including Rockefeller Sr., who testified that, even after knowing that guards in his pay had committed atrocities against the strikers, he "would have taken no action" to prevent his hirelings from attacking them. The commission's report endorsed many of the reforms the unions sought, and provided support for bills establishing a national eight-hour workday and a ban on child labor.

== In other media ==
Several popular songs have been written and recorded about the events at Ludlow. American folk singer Woody Guthrie's is "Ludlow Massacre", Red Dirt country singer Jason Boland's "Ludlow", and Irish musician Andy Irvine's is "The Monument (Lest We Forget)".

Upton Sinclair's novel King Coal is loosely based on the origin and aftermath of the Ludlow Massacre. Thomas Pynchon's 2006 novel Against the Day contains a chapter on the massacre.

American writer and Colorado Poet Laureate David Mason wrote what he calls a verse-novel, Ludlow (2007), inspired by the labor dispute. Composer Lori Laitman's opera Ludlow is based on Mason's book. The University of Colorado's New Opera Works presented Act I of the opera in June 2012, directed by Beth Greenberg.

== Commemorations ==
- Ludlow Tent Colony Site
- U.S. National Register of Historic Places
- U.S. National Historic Landmark
- Area: 40 acres (16 ha)
- Built: 1913
- Architects: Sullivan, Hugh
- NRHP reference No.: 85001328

Significant dates
- Added to NRHP: June 19, 1985
- Designated NHL: January 16, 2009

=== Memorial ===
In 1916, the United Mine Workers of America bought the site of the Ludlow tent colony. Two years later, they erected the Ludlow Monument to commemorate those who died during the strike. It was fabricated by the Jones Brothers Company of Barre, Vermont, using local granite and was commissioned by Sam Falsetto, president of the United Mine Workers of Trinidad, Colorado. The Springfield Granite Company served as the contractor. The monument was damaged in May 2003 by unknown vandals. The repaired monument was unveiled on June 5, 2005, with slightly altered faces on the statues.

=== National Historic Landmark ===
The tent colony site was listed on the National Register of Historic Places in 1985, was designated a U.S. National Historic Landmark in 2009. Although the area continued to be occupied by mine workers and their families after the events of May 1914, they relocated, leaving the original encampment site relatively undisturbed. The site is consequently one of the best-preserved archaeological remains of such an encampment, and the monument is one of the earliest to commemorate a labor action of this type. The site is the first of its kind to be investigated by archeologists.

On May 7, 2003, vandals attacked the monument cutting off the solid granite/marble head of the male figure and the arm of the female figure. The missing parts were never recovered but replaced in 2005 with funding from private donations.

=== Centennial ===
On April 19, 2013, Colorado Governor John Hickenlooper signed an executive order to create the Ludlow Centennial Commemoration Commission. The group worked to develop programming in the state, such as lectures and exhibits, to commemorate the Ludlow workers' struggle and raise awareness of the massacre. It worked with Colorado museums, historical societies, churches and art galleries, and supplied programming in 2014.

== Historical investigation ==
=== Archaeology ===
In 1996, the 1913–1914 Colorado Coalfield War Project began under the leadership of Randall H. McGuire of Binghamton University, Dean Saitta of University of Denver, and Philip Duke of Fort Lewis College, who later formed the Ludlow Collective. Their team conducted excavations of the territory of the former tent colony and surrounding areas.

== Gallery ==
Relevant images
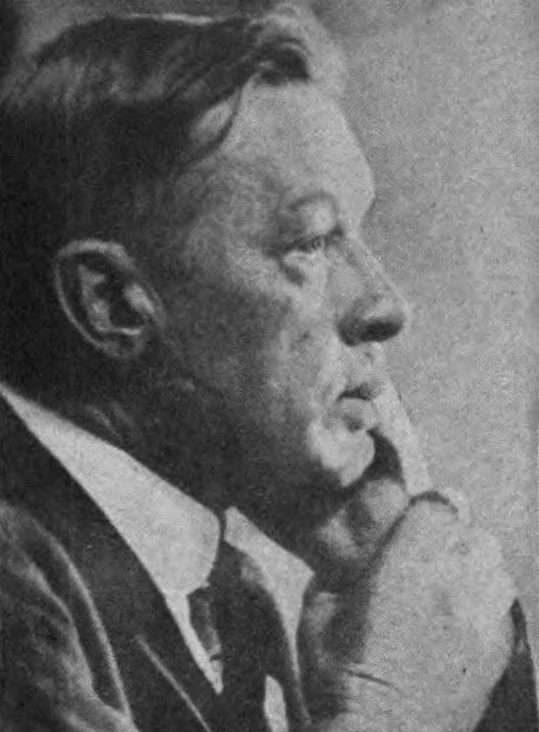
Jesse F. Welborn, president of the Colorado Fuel and Iron Company.

John R. Lawson, United Mine Workers Executive Board Officer.

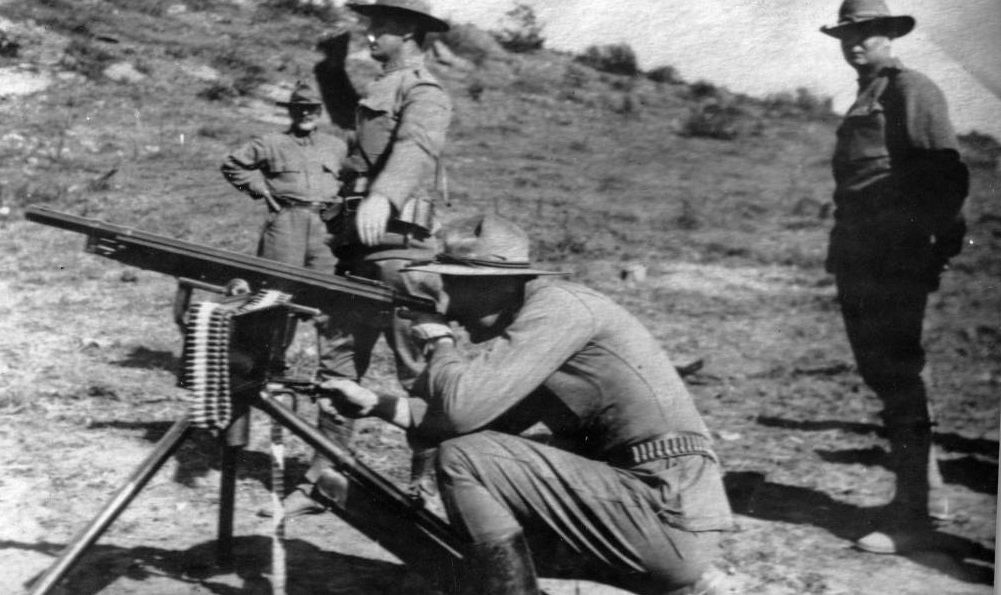
Colorado National Guard using a tripod-mounted M1895 Colt-Browning machine gun

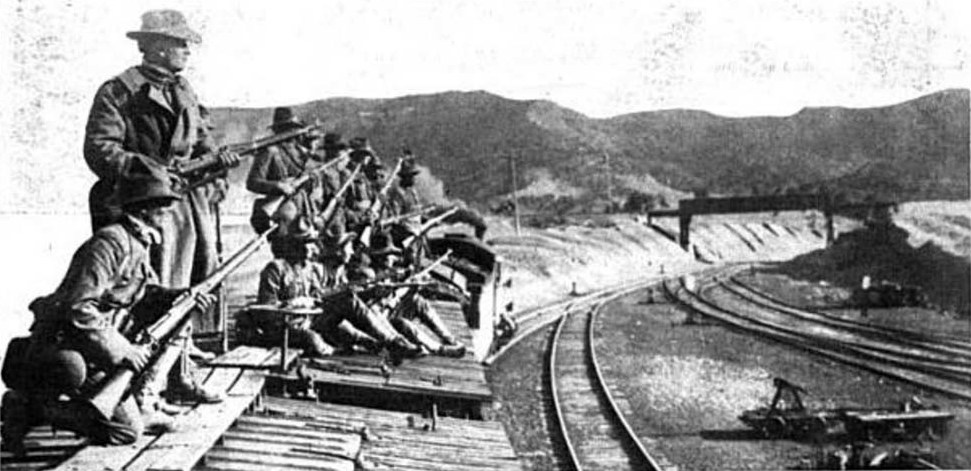
Colorado National Guard soldiers entering the strike zone.

Soldiers of the Colorado National Guard deployed in Ludlow.

Photo from The Survey, 1915, shows "a closer view of the destruction wrought at Ludlow."

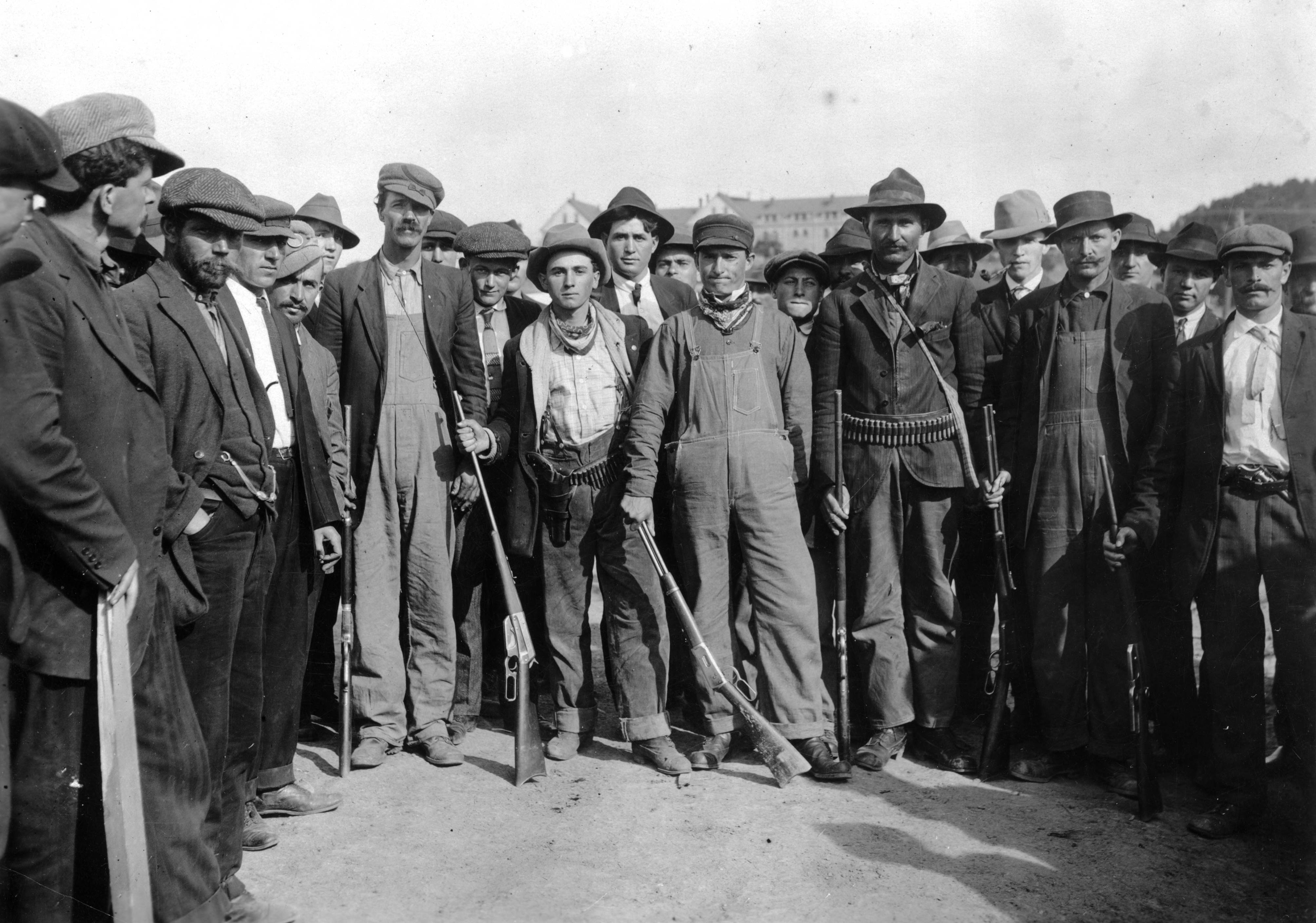
Armed United Mine Workers of America strikers, Ludlow 1914.

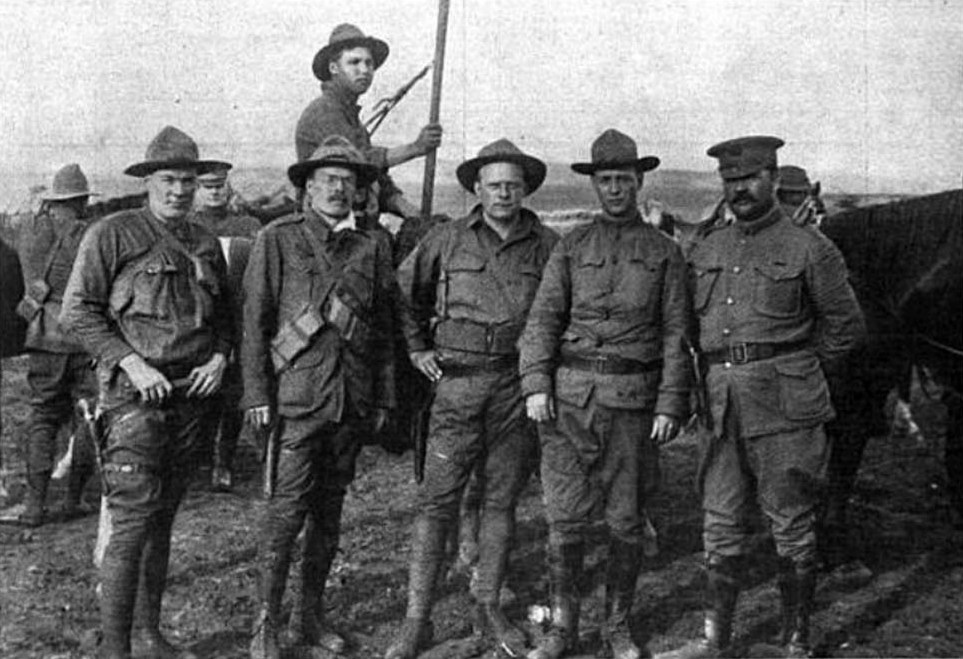
Karl Linderfelt, center. Photo caption reads: "Officers of the Colorado National Guard. From left to right: Captain R. J. Linderfelt, Lieut. T. C. Linderfelt, Lieut. K. E. Linderfelt, (who faced the charge of assault upon Louis Tikas, the dead strike leader), Lieut. G.S. Lawrence and Major Patrick Hamrock. The last three were in the Ludlow battle of April 20, 1914."

Colorado National Guard General John Chase.

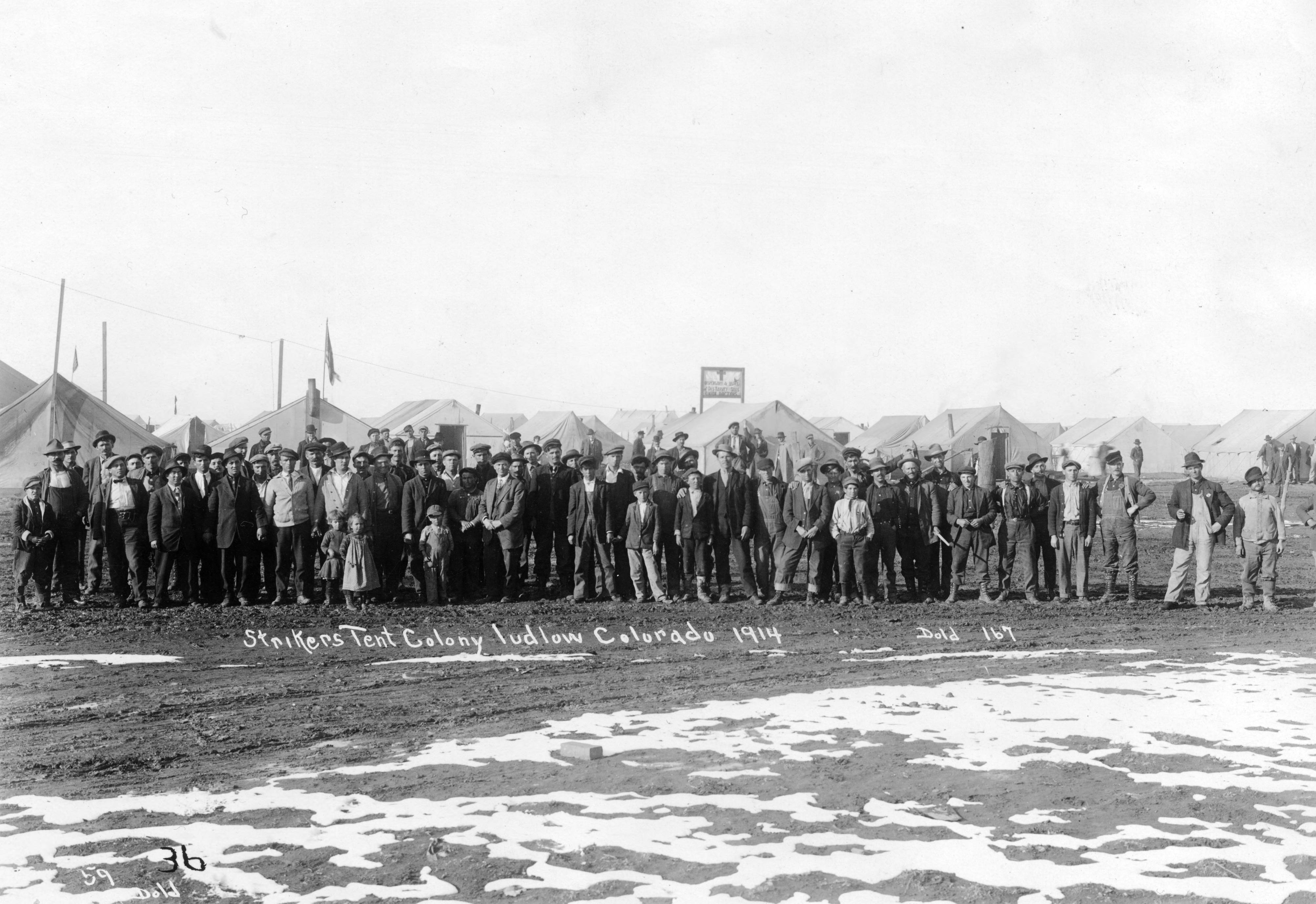
A group of Ludlow strikers in front of the Ludlow tent colony site.

== See also ==
- Coal Wars
- Colorado Labor Wars
- Columbine Mine Massacre of 1927
- Labor history of the United States
- Labor movement
- Labor unions
- Labor unions in the United States
- List of battles fought in Colorado
- List of incidents of civil unrest in the United States
- List of massacres in the United States
- List of worker deaths in United States labor disputes
- Ludlow Massacre (song)
- Mary Thomas O'Neal
- Union violence
