= South Pueblo, Colorado =

South Pueblo, Colorado used to be a city in Colorado. It was one of three towns, in addition to Central Pueblo and Bessemer, that were later incorporated into Pueblo, Colorado.

== History ==
South Pueblo began as a neighborhood of makeshift homes arose in 1880 near the works under construction for a new steel mill—later to become Colorado Coal and Iron Company and, by 1892, Colorado Fuel and Iron Company (CF&I). The settlement was initially called Taylorville, named after the superintendent of construction, Col. W. W. Taylor. The company wanted the name changed so referred to the area as "Steelworks." In 1881, as more permanent dwellings were constructed, the corporation began to organize a town under the name of "Bessemer."

The 1880 steel works were one of the projects of the Central Colorado Improvement Company, founded by General William J. Palmer in 1872, with plans "to purchase lands, minerals springs, coal and iron and other mines and quarries in Colorado Territory, and the establishment and building up of colonies, towns, coal mining, iron making and manufacturing works, and to build canals and wagon roads." The work on the mill began with excavation of the foundation for the first blast furnace in February 1880, on a prairie south of what would later become South Pueblo.

Much more history and context is given by the South Pueblo Historic Context Study, conducted 2003–2011, and summarized in a presentation by the City of Pueblo in July 2011.
