= Steelworks Center of the West =

Coordinates: 38.23787°N 104.6124°W

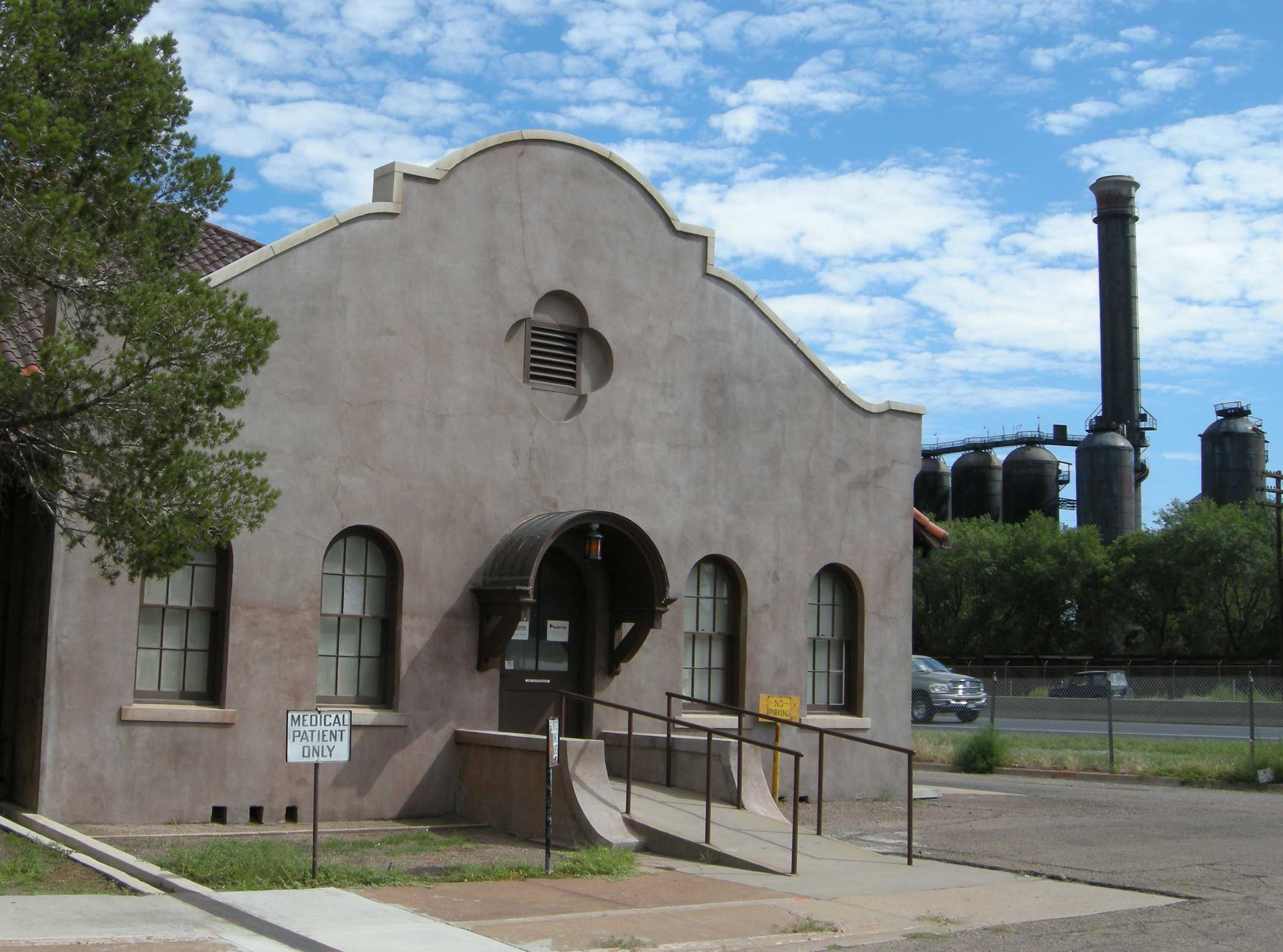
Steelworks Museum

The Steelworks Center of the West, is a non-profit organization focused on preserving the history of the coal and steel industry in the Western United States. Based in Pueblo, Colorado and formerly known as the Bessemer Historical Society, which took its name from the community of Bessemer, site of the Colorado Coal and Iron Bessemer Works which was named after the Bessemer process for making steel invented by Henry Bessemer.

Colorado Coal and Iron Company merged with the Colorado Fuel Company to form Colorado Fuel and Iron Company (CF&I) in 1892.

The Steelworks Center of the West owns and operates the Steelworks Museum, the Steelworks Archives (formerly the CF&I Archives), and the Steelworks Park that is currently under construction in Pueblo. They provide continuing education of the steel industry's impact on the region through the preservation of historic archives, artifacts, and buildings of the Colorado Fuel and Iron Company, and through related activities leading to the industrialization of the Western US. They collect, preserve, and exhibit documents and artifacts from the steel and mining industry, Pueblo’s Bessemer neighborhood, and from the employees and families of employees who have worked either at the steel mill or in the coal and iron mines of Southern Colorado.

== See also ==
- List of historical societies in Colorado
