= Charles M. Betts =

American Medal of Honor recipient (1838-1905)

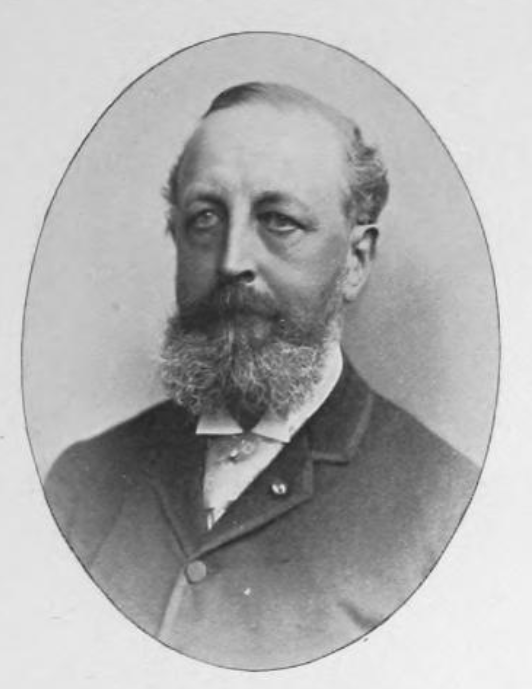
- Born: August 9, 1838; Warminster Township, Pennsylvania, U.S.
- Died: November 10, 1905; Philadelphia, Pennsylvania, U.S.
- Burial place: West Laurel Hill Cemetery, Bala Cynwyd, Pennsylvania, U.S.
- Military career
- Allegiance: United States of America
- Branch: United States Army
- Service years: 1862 - 1865
- Rank: Lieutenant colonel
- Unit: 15th Pennsylvania Cavalry Regiment
- Conflicts: American Civil War; Battle of Antietam; Battle of Stones River; Stoneman's 1865 raid
- Awards: Medal of Honor

Charles Malone Betts (August 9, 1838 – November 10, 1905) was an American military officer who served as lieutenant colonel in the Union army during the American Civil War. He was awarded the Medal of Honor on October 10, 1892, for his actions during the war on April 19, 1865, when he led his regiment to charge and capture a South Carolina cavalry battalion.

He owned a wholesale lumber company and served as a Republican member of the Pennsylvania House of Representatives from 1885 to 1888.

== Early life and education ==
Betts was born on August 9, 1838, Warminster Township, Pennsylvania to John and Sarah C. Betts. He attended the Loller Academy in Hatboro, Pennsylvania, and Gummere's School in Burlington, New Jersey. He worked at Malone & Taylor, a wholesale lumber company, in Philadelphia from 1856 to 1861.

== Military career ==
At the outbreak of the Civil War he was commissioned lieutenant by Governor Andrew Gregg Curtin of Company D of the Blues Reserves, a military company formed for the home defense of Philadelphia. In November 1861, he resigned his commission and moved to Alexandria, Virginia, to accept a role as chief clerk in the Quartermaster Department for General William B. Franklin's division. He supported the Army of the Potomac through the Seven Days Battles. He wanted a more active role in the war and returned to Pennsylvania to enlist as a private in the 15th Pennsylvania Cavalry Regiment on August 12, 1862.

He fought at the Battle of Antietam and was transferred to Louisville, Kentucky, and made first sergeant of Company E. The regiment was transferred to Nashville, Tennessee, and fought in the Battle of Stones River. The regiment was reorganized March 1, 1863, and he was made captain and placed in charge of a battalion as no major was commissioned until March 1864. He fought against Cherokee who had enlisted for confederate service near Gatlinburg, Tennessee. On December 10, 1863, he was wounded in the left arm. In May 1864, he was promoted to major, and in early 1865, to lieutenant colonel.

He participated in Stoneman's 1865 raid, and in the search for the fleeing Jefferson Davis. In April 1865, his regiment captured seven enemy wagons containing one hundred eighty thousand dollars in coin, one million five hundred eighty thousand in confederate bank notes and bonds, and four million dollars of confederate currency. The wagons also contained the personal belongings and papers of Generals P. G. T. Beauregard and Gideon Johnson Pillow.

He was awarded the Medal of Honor for his conduct leading his regiment to charge and successfully capture a South Carolina cavalry battalion near Greensboro, North Carolina, on April 19, 1865. He was mustered out of service on June 21, 1865, along with his regiment. The Medal of Honor was issued to him on October 10, 1892.

He was a member of the Pennsylvania Commandery, Military Order of the Loyal Legion of the United States and served on the council for three years. He remained active in the Grand Army of the Republic and served as president of Post 2 Philadelphia.

== Business career ==
He worked for the wholesale lumber industry and was a member of the firm Taylor & Betts for 25 years. In 1890, he was a senior member of the firm Charles M. Betts & Co. with offices in Philadelphia and Buffalo, New York. He was one of the incorporators of the Lumbermen's Exchange in Philadelphia, served as director, and as president in 1890. He served as president of the National Wholesale Lumbermen's Association for two years and the Philadelphia Wholesale Lumber Dealers' Association for several years. He was a director of the Trades League of Philadelphia and the Consolidation National Bank.

== Political career ==
He served as a Republican member of the Pennsylvania House of Representatives from 1885 to 1888.

Betts died on November 10, 1905, in Philadelphia and was interred at West Laurel Hill Cemetery in Bala Cynwyd, Pennsylvania.

== Personal life ==
He married Louisa G. Hance on May 3, 1866, and together they had five children.

== Medal of Honor citation ==
With a force of but 75 men, while on a scouting expedition, by a judicious disposition of his men, surprised and captured an entire battalion of the enemy's cavalry.

== See also ==
- List of American Civil War Medal of Honor recipients: A–F
