= 15th Pennsylvania Cavalry Regiment =

Union Army cavalry regiment

- Pennsylvania flag
- Active: August 22. 1862 to June 21, 1865
- Country: United States
- Allegiance: Union
- Branch: Cavalry
- Engagements: Battle of Antietam; Battle of Stones River; Battle of Chickamauga

Commanders
- Notable commanders: Col. William Jackson Palmer

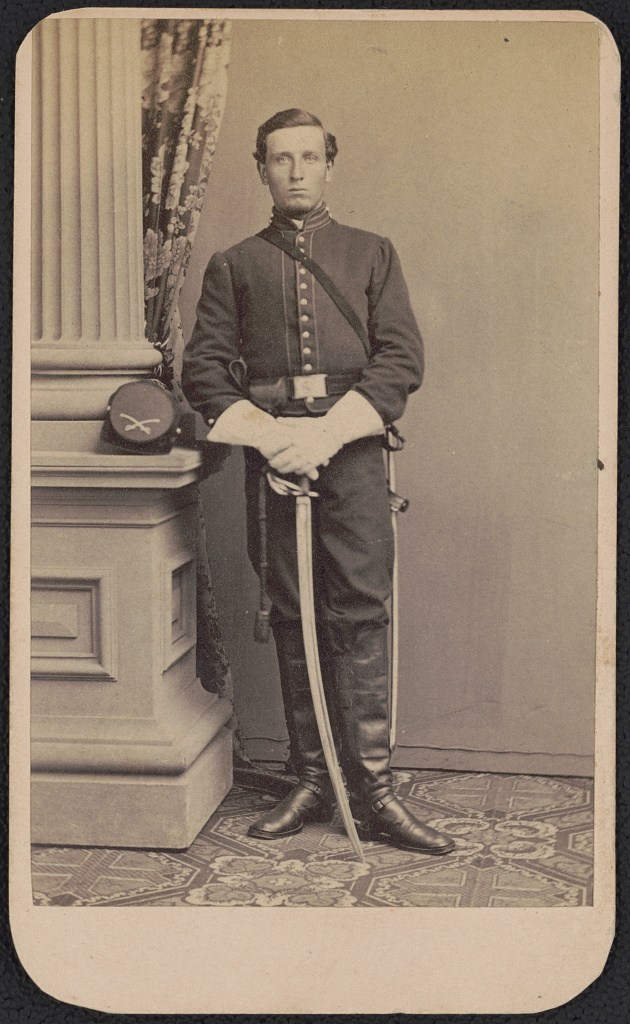
Private John E. Wildes of Co. B, 15th Pennsylvania, photographed by Oliver H. Willard

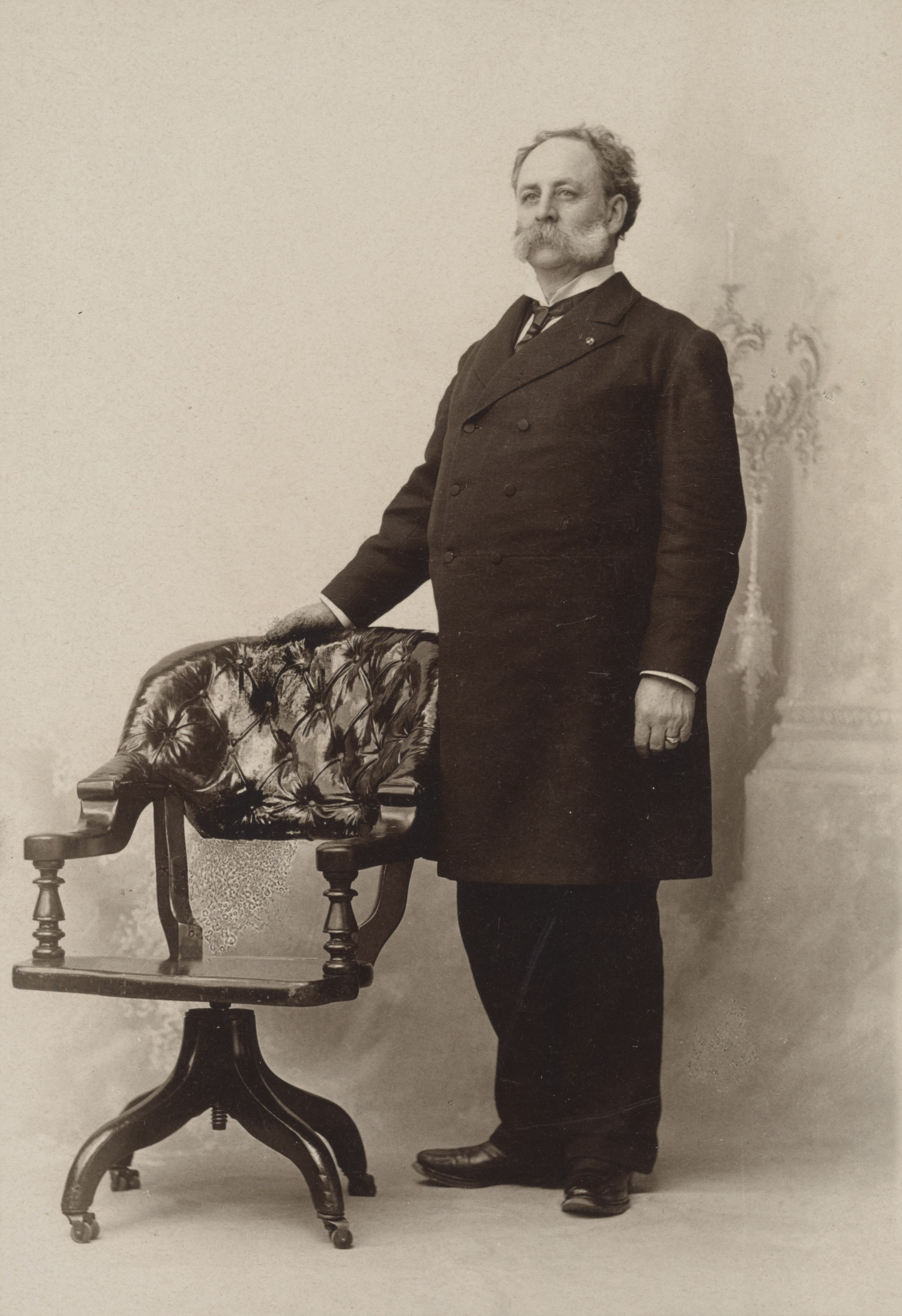
Union veteran Captain Wilmon Whilldin Blackmar of Co. K, 15th Pennsylvania Cavalry Regiment and Co. H, 1st West Virginia Cavalry Regiment, standing next to the chair in which General Ulysses S. Grant sat during General Robert E. Lee's surrender, presented to Blackmar by his friend and comrade Major General Henry Capehart. From the Liljenquist Family Collection of Civil War Photographs, Prints and Photographs Division, Library of Congress

The 15th Pennsylvania Cavalry Regiment, known as the Anderson Cavalry and the 160th Volunteers, was a three-year cavalry regiment in the Union Army during the American Civil War. It was recruited and formed in the summer of 1862 by officers and men of the Anderson Troop, an independent company of the Pennsylvania Volunteers that had been mustered the previous November.

Until the last three months of the war the 15th Pennsylvania Cavalry was an independent unit reporting directly to the headquarters of the Army of the Cumberland, performing escort, scouting, courier and other details for the commanding general. Composed of hand-picked men most of whom were qualified to receive commissions, it became the favorite unit of both Generals William S. Rosecrans and George H. Thomas.

== History ==
The regiment of 1100 men in ten companies was raised by officers of the Anderson Troop in July and August 1862 from more than 3,000 applicants representing 30 Pennsylvania counties. The average age of the recruits was 20 and all had been required to submit letters of recommendation from upstanding citizens of their local communities. After the first 200 men reported to "Camp Alabama" at Carlisle, Pennsylvania, six companies (B through G) were mustered into United States service by a captain of the regular 1st Cavalry on August 22. Anderson Troop was to have become Company A, but the consolidation never took place and Company A was raised from recruits in October 1862. The Anderson Cavalry, as the regiment was immediately known, was authorized to wear a distinctive dragoon-style shell jacket with orange trimming instead of cavalry yellow.

=== Antietam campaign ===
Partially organized, without any commissioned officers except their prospective colonel Capt. William J. Palmer, and equipped only with sabers, half of the 900 soldiers then in camp were sent to help the Army of the Potomac resist the Confederate Invasion of Maryland. Approximately 400 men, provided horses and carbines, were scattered as pickets, skirmished with Confederates near Hagerstown and participated in the Battle of Antietam, where one trooper was killed. Palmer was captured after the battle while scouting for General George B. McClellan behind the lines.

=== Army of the Cumberland ===
The 15th returned to Camp Alabama for drilling by non-commissioned regulars stationed there. On November 7, 1862, it left Carlisle by railroad for the Department of the Cumberland under its lieutenant colonel, William Spencer, traveling over a period of three days to Louisville, Kentucky, via Indianapolis, Indiana. There it drilled and was mounted and equipped on November 22. Only 12 of 36 company officers had yet been appointed, all by Department Commanding General William Rosecrans upon their arrival in Louisville, and only two-thirds of the non-commissioned officers had been named, so that widespread discontent with the lack of leadership spread through the regiment when it was sent on December 8 to Nashville, Tennessee.

Making its march mounted and in inclement weather, when it reached Bowling Green, Kentucky, it was sent on an all-night march to Glasgow, Kentucky, where Confederate General John Hunt Morgan was reported camped with part of his regiment, but when the Anderson Cavalry charged into the town at dawn Morgan had left an hour before. The 15th remained in Bowling Green until December 21, reaching Nashville and the Army of the Cumberland late on the afternoon of December 24. Lt-Col. Spencer, who had been Palmer's first lieutenant in the Anderson Troop and had previously served 15 years as a sergeant in the regulars, became too ill to take to saddle and command of the still partially organized regiment devolved to the senior major (and former first sergeant), Adolph G. Rosengarten.

=== Stones River campaign ===
==== Mutiny at Nashville ====
The regiment was ordered to march with the army on December 26, 1862, towards the Confederate Army of Tennessee at Murfreesboro, but all but 300 of the enlisted men refused to leave camp. On December 28, Rosecrans took 23 more men from the Anderson Troop previously recommended for commissions and made them temporary officers to address the complaints of the disgruntled soldiers regarding lack of leadership. 200 troopers still refused a new order to march the next day, however.

Rosecrans then ordered a show of force be made by the division of Gen. James D. Morgan, part of the garrison at Nashville, to compel obedience. 100 of the men in camp moved to the front of their own volition before a show of force could be made. Rather than apply duress with the insubordinate soldiers, Morgan used a promise that they would meet with Rosecrans to induce the remainder to leave camp under the command of the lieutenant colonel of the 10th Illinois Volunteers. That evening however, after encountering a brigade of Wheeler's Confederate cavalry and a battery of artillery blocking the road at La Vergne, they returned to their original camp in Nashville. On December 31 those in camp were ordered to perform wagon train escort duty but again refused.

415 soldiers were arrested and confined for insubordination. They submitted a list of grievances as cause, alleging a failure to appoint a sufficient number of company officers (which was true; seven companies had no captain and four had no officers at all), being improperly mustered into federal service (or not at all), inadequate equipment and weapons, and enlistment inducements they claimed had not been honored. On January 19, 1863, Rosecrans offered to release from confinement those immediately willing to be restored to duty. 208 confined in the city workhouse still refused, but the others were returned to the ranks. Those returning to duty did so with recalcitrance and four were returned to confinement when they refused to perform picket duty.

==== Battle of Stones River ====
The 300 troopers who had marched with the army scouted the advance of the Union right wing, determining that the Confederate army was concentrating on Murfreesboro. It twice encountered Confederate forces, skirmishing with dismounted Texas cavalry units at Nolensville on December 27. In the second engagement, on December 29 at Wilkinson's Cross Roads west of Murfreesboro, its skirmishers were ambushed by Confederate pickets of the 10th South Carolina Infantry, leading to an impetuous mounted charge with carbines by the battalion under Rosengarten. However two regiments of Confederates concealed in a corn field were drawn up in line of battle behind a fence paralleling the pike. Stopped by the fence and receiving aimed volleys of musket fire at point-blank range, the regiment quickly lost 11 men killed, 50 wounded and 9 missing. Rosengarten was killed and Major Frank B. Ward, another former sergeant in the Anderson Troop, was mortally wounded, dying on January 11, 1863. Ward was barely 20 at the time he was wounded.

Under the command of a captain, the survivors of the regiment deployed with Stanley's cavalry on the right of the Union position, taking part without loss in two mounted saber charges late on the first day of the Battle of Stones River that drove a brigade of Confederate cavalry from the field, with troopers of the Anderson Cavalry capturing the colors of the 3rd Alabama Cavalry. On New Year's Day it escorted the army's supply wagons back to Nashville, repulsing several attempts by the Confederate cavalry of Gen. Joseph Wheeler to destroy the train. Privates John Tweedale (Company B) and John Gregory Bourke (Company D, and just 16 years old), both of whom became officers in the regular army after the war, were later honored for gallantry at Stones River, two of the six troopers of the Anderson Cavalry who eventually received the Medal of Honor. In the week after it arrived in Nashville, total casualties of the 15th Pennsylvania Cavalry were 14 dead, 10 wounded, and 57 captured, many of whom had been wounded on December 29 and were in a hospital captured early on the first day of battle at Stones River.

=== Subsequent campaigning ===
==== 1863 reorganization ====
Colonel Palmer was exchanged in January 1863 and resumed command of the now dismounted regiment on February 7. It moved it into a new camp at Murfreesboro, Camp Garesché, named for Rosecrans' chief of staff killed at Stones River, where Palmer assembled his command and promised it a complete reorganization by the end of the month. Nine of the 12 company officers originally appointed by Rosecrans resigned February 27 and were not re-appointed. The regiment was expanded to 12 companies with the old companies broken up and the men redistributed. Palmer chose permanent officers to fill all vacancies, the majority of whom came from the enlisted ranks of the Anderson Troop and had been serving as temporary officers since December 28.

A new lieutenant colonel from outside the regiment, Charles B. Lamborn, arrived on March 7 to replace Spencer, who resigned in poor health on February 6. A few days later new equipment was issued and 200 horses received. Mounted drill resumed and by April the regiment was again conducting scouting operations for the Army of the Cumberland east of Murfreesboro. The remaining 212 confined men were returned to duty with charges against them suspended on condition of good behavior henceforth. A final organizational crisis occurred on May 8, 1863, when 13 officers appointed on March 1 resigned as a group because their commissions from Pennsylvania Governor A. G. Curtin had not yet been acted upon. Palmer accepted the resignations and promoted replacements from the ranks of the regiment.

==== Department of the Cumberland ====
For the remainder of the war, the 15th Pennsylvania remained in the Department of the Cumberland, with Companies B, H, and K tasked as escort for department headquarters. The remaining nine companies scouted, conducted periodic raids, and frequently engaged in skirmishes under Palmer. The regiment performed with distinction during the Tullahoma Campaign and at the Battle of Chickamauga, and then participated in the Chattanooga, Knoxville and Nashville Campaigns. At Chattanooga the Andersons were initially camped at Cameron Hill, but the loss of their wagons to Wheeler's cavalry while foraging for fodder on October 2 resulted in the 15th Pennsylvania moving to the Sequatchie Valley, where corn, cattle and pigs were plentiful. Camping near Dunlap in October and Pikeville for the remainder of the winter, the Andersons performed picket duties and gathered forage, particularly beef for the army and corn for its horses and mules.

The relief of Knoxville began a 70-day winter campaign in upper East Tennessee for Palmer, Lamborn and 175 men of the 15th Pennsylvania Cavalry, reinforced by a detachment of the 10th Ohio Cavalry and attached to the Cavalry Corps of the Army of the Ohio. On December 10 near Gatlinburg they surprised a similarly sized force of Confederate cavalry, many of whom were Cherokee, in its camp and forced them back over the mountains into North Carolina. Two weeks later on Christmas Eve the 15th Pennsylvania suffered a sharp reverse near Dandridge when the battalion was trapped momentarily in a fenced pocket during a skirmish. Ten troopers were captured and confined in Andersonville Prison, where half of them perished. Five days later, on nearly the same ground, the 15th Pennsylvania made two mounted charges during the Battle of Mossy Creek, contributing to the Union victory. The scouts made by the Anderson Cavalry were generally conducted at night and the regiment became known among the local, largely Unionist communities as "Palmer's Owls."

Winter campaigning was harsh on the regiment's horses. When it went into camp at Rossville, Georgia, in March 1864, its remaining mounts were taken for Sherman's Atlanta campaign. The 15th Pennsylvania was sent back to Nashville by foot and train for remount, arriving May 8, and was out of field service for three months, finally receiving new horses in July. The regiment also received and drilled new recruits and marched on August 1 for Chattanooga, where it arrived two weeks later. There it guarded the railroad lines between Chattanooga and Atlanta while also scouting for movements of Hood's army.

On September 13 while at Calhoun, Georgia, it received new orders to return to East Tennessee to locate and intercept the enemy cavalry brigade of John S. Williams. Unable to do so, the campaign ended in mid-October and the 15th Pennsylvania returned to Camp Lingle (named for 1st Lt. Harvey S. Lingle of Company G, killed at Mossy Creek) at Wauhatchie Station, where it camped until December 20. Between December 28, 1864, and March 2, 1865, the 15th Pennsylvania was encamped at Huntsville, Alabama. In the immediate aftermath of the Battle of Nashville, it pursued the supply trains of Hood's army, catching and destroying all his pontoons near Russellville, Alabama, on December 31, and more than 300 wagons that day and the first day of 1865, penetrating into Mississippi as far as Fulton.

=== Concluding operations ===
In mid-March 1865 the 15th Pennsylvania Cavalry was assigned to the 1st Brigade, Cavalry Division, District of East Tennessee, and moved back to Chattanooga. Col. Palmer was breveted a brigadier general to command the brigade. The brigade set out on March 21 as the vanguard of a division-sized raiding force under Major General George Stoneman sent into North Carolina and southwest Virginia to destroy as much railroad as they could to interrupt the flow of supplies to the beleaguered Army of Northern Virginia. The 15th Pennsylvania split at Jacksonville, Virginia, on April 5, most accompanying Stoneman's force towards Salem, North Carolina, but a battalion of 230 under Major William Wagner was sent north to make a demonstration at Lynchburg, a key rail center, to give the impression that it was the vanguard of a much larger force threatening Lee's line of retreat. In four days Wagner's battalion destroyed numerous bridges and reached the outskirts of Lynchburg on the morning of April 8 before turning south to rejoin the main body of Stoneman's force at Salisbury, North Carolina. Lee surrendered at Appomattox Court House, 20 miles to the east, the day after the demonstration. The regiment subsequently captured General Braxton Bragg and his staff and pursued Confederate President Jefferson Davis through Georgia.

The 15th Pennsylvania Cavalry Regiment, numbering 627 officers and men, was mustered out at Nashville, Tennessee, on June 21, 1865. 162 recruits just received were held in service as "Company A, Anderson Cavalry" at department headquarters until mustered out on July 18.

== Casualties ==
Total losses during the war:

- Killed and mortally wounded: 3 officers, 22 enlisted men
- Died of disease: 0 officers, 103 enlisted men
- Total casualties: 3 officers, 125 enlisted men

== Commanders ==
- Colonel William Jackson Palmer
- Lieutenant-Colonel Charles M. Betts

== Notable soldiers ==
- Private A. O. Granger, private secretary to General William Tecumseh Sherman
- Corporal Alexander Leroy Hawkins, future Colonel of the 10th Pennsylvania Volunteer Infantry Regiment during the Spanish–American War John F Conaway

== See also ==
- List of Pennsylvania Civil War regiments

== Sources ==
- History of the Fifteenth Pennsylvania Volunteer Cavalry: which was recruited and known as the Anderson Cavalry in the Rebellion of 1861-1865, Google Books
- 15th Regiment, Pennsylvania Cavalry (160th Volunteers), Battle Unit Details, National Park Service
- "List of the field and staff officers and members of the Fifteenth Pennsylvania Cavalry (or more familiarly known as the "Anderson Cavalry"), who went to the front and were engaged in the battle of Murfreesborough." Accessed 3/5th/2015.
- Pennsylvania Cavalry Regiments, History, Service and Muster Rolls. Accessed 3/5th/2015
