= William Jackson Palmer =

American engineer and veteran of the Civil War (1836–1909)

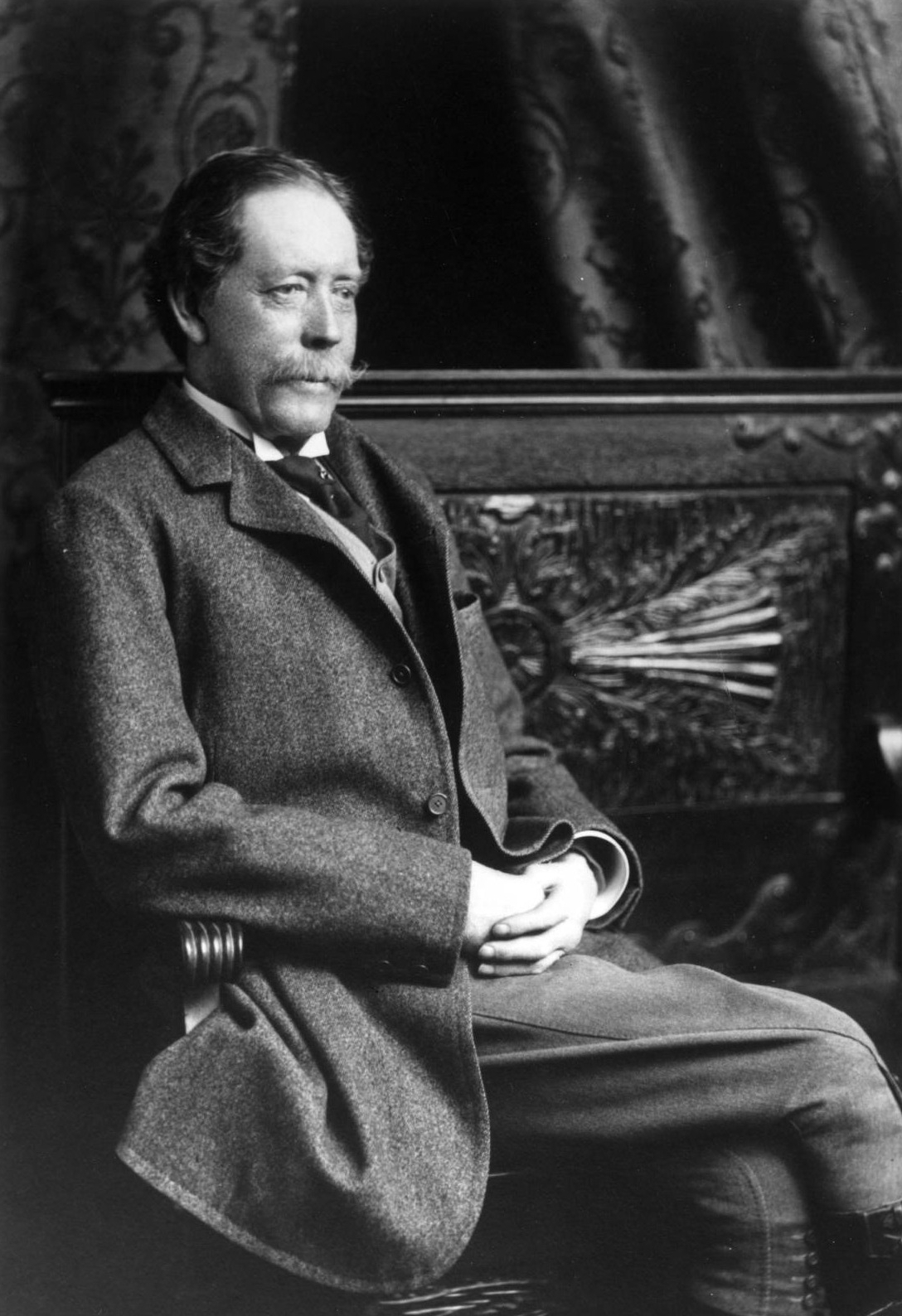
- Born: September 18, 1836; Leipsic, Delaware
- Died: March 13, 1909 (aged 72); Colorado Springs, Colorado
- Burial place: Evergreen Cemetery, Colorado Springs, Colorado
- Spouse: Mary Lincoln Mellen
- Military career
- Allegiance: United States; Union
- Branch: United States Army; Union Army
- Service years: 1861–1865
- Rank: Colonel; Brevet Brigadier General
- Commands: 15th Pennsylvania Cavalry
- Conflicts: American Civil War
- Awards: Medal of Honor
- Other work: Founder of Colorado Springs, Colorado and builder of the Denver and Rio Grande Railroad

William Jackson Palmer (September 18, 1836 – March 13, 1909) was an American civil engineer and veteran of the American Civil War. During the Civil War, he was promoted to brevet brigadier general and received a Medal of Honor for his actions.

In his early career, Palmer helped develop the expanding railroads of the United States in Pennsylvania; this was interrupted by the American Civil War. He served in colorful fashion as a Union Army cavalry Colonel and was appointed to the brevet grade of Brigadier General. After the war, he contributed financially to educational efforts for the freed former slaves of the South.

Heading west in 1867, Palmer helped build the Kansas Pacific Railway. He befriended a young English doctor, Dr. William Abraham Bell, who became his partner in most of his business ventures. Generally Palmer took the role of president with Bell as vice president. The two men are best known as co-founders of the Denver and Rio Grande Railroad (Rio Grande). The Rio Grande and its successors eventually operated the largest network of narrow gauge railroad in the United States. They were ultimately absorbed by the 21st century Union Pacific Railroad.

Palmer and Bell are notable for helping introduce to the United States the practices of burning coal (rather than wood) for railroad engines and using narrow gauge railways. He helped develop rail-related industries in Colorado, such as a large steel mill near Pueblo. He founded the city of Colorado Springs, in 1871, as well as several other communities. Palmer founded Colorado Springs as a "dry" community, based on his Quaker and temperance beliefs. He funded institutions of higher education and helped found a hospital for tuberculosis, then incurable. Public schools in Colorado Springs were named for both him and his wife, Mary (née Mellen) Palmer, who was known by her nickname of "Queen". A statue of William J. Palmer still stands in downtown Colorado Springs, across from the school named in his honor.

== Early life ==
William Jackson Palmer was born in 1836 to a Hicksite sect Quaker family on their Kinsdale Farm in 1836, near Leipsic, Kent County, Delaware. His parents were John and Matilda (Jackson) Palmer. When he was five years old, his family moved to Germantown, then an independent city outside Philadelphia, Pennsylvania. He attended the private Friends School, and then public schools: Zane Street School and Boys' Central High School.

== Pennsylvania railroads ==
In 1851, Palmer went to work at the age of 15 in western Pennsylvania as a clerk for Hempfield Railroad's engineering department. Two years later, at age 17, he worked under chief engineer Charles Ellet, Jr. as a rodman. Palmer became transitman for Hempfield in 1854.

Frank H. Jackson, president of Westmoreland Coal Company and Palmer's maternal uncle, encouraged him to go to England to study coal mining and railroads, which he believed were going to be key to United States development. The young Palmer was particularly interested in whether railroad engines could run on anthracite coal rather than wood as fuel. He left in the summer of 1855 for a six-month period, having arranged to write paid articles for Miner's Journal of Pottsville, Pennsylvania, to finance the trip abroad. He also borrowed money from his uncle. (Note: There are differing opinions about when Palmer went to Europe. The National Cyclopedia of American Biography says that he studied in England about 1854. Lowry says that Thomson sent him to Europe.) While in England, Palmer met with noted railroad engineers such as Isambard Kingdom Brunel and Robert Stephenson,—and visited railroads, mills, and coal mines.

In 1856, his uncle Jackson hired Palmer to work at Westmoreland Coal Company as the secretary and treasurer. The following year he worked at the Pennsylvania Railroad and became private secretary to President John Edgar Thomson, a successful Quaker businessman. At this time, future industrialist Andrew Carnegie was a peer and secretary to a company vice president. Palmer wrote, Reports of Experiments with Coal Burning Locomotives and learned about running a railroad from Thomson. Palmer began an evaluation of converting steam engines to run on coal, which was more abundant, rather than wood. His findings were key to changing the type of fuel used to fuel the country's locomotives. He began a relationship with Thomas A. Scott at the Pennsylvania Railroad. Scott was later appointed as Assistant Secretary of War in charge of military transportation during the Civil War.

== Civil War service ==
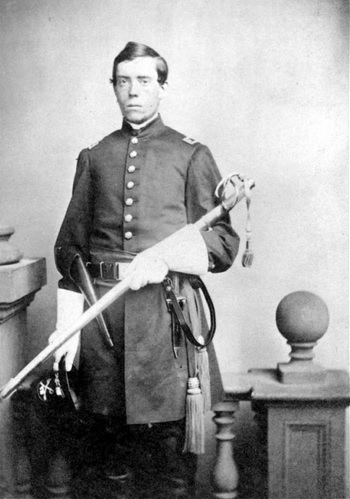
William Jackson Palmer, American Civil War, 1861. Broadbent & Company, Philadelphia. Courtesy of Starsmore Center for Local History, Colorado Springs, Colorado.

As the American Civil War began in 1861, although his Quaker upbringing made Palmer abhor violence, his passionate abolitionism compelled him in keeping with the dictates of his conscience to enlist in the Pennsylvania volunteers. Palmer took a commission in the Union Army. He organized the Anderson Troop, an independent company of Pennsylvania cavalry, in the fall of 1861 and was elected its captain. Originally formed to act as a bodyguard for Brig. Gen. Robert Anderson, it instead served as the headquarters cavalry for General Don Carlos Buell, commanding the Army of the Ohio. Impressed with the "elite scouts" that Palmer had assembled, Buell detailed Palmer and 12 of his men to go back to Pennsylvania to recruit more men to form a battalion around the Anderson Troop that would be known as the "1st Anderson Cavalry".

In ten days of recruiting, however, Palmer received enough applications for enlistment to form a regiment, which was authorized as the 15th Pennsylvania Cavalry. He was appointed the regiment's colonel. Before Palmer was able to organize the regiment at Camp Alabama in Carlisle, Pennsylvania, he and a portion of it were ordered on September 9 to help the Army of the Potomac resist the Confederates invasion of Maryland. For nearly a week Palmer, accompanied by a telegrapher, personally sought information of Lee's movements every night in civilian clothing, and transmitted his findings to General George B. McClellan via telegraph connections.

Two days after the Battle of Antietam, Palmer was captured while scouting at the personal direction of McClellan, seeking information on any preparations by Lee's army to cross the Potomac River back into Virginia. He was on the Confederate side of the river, again garbed in civilian clothes and accompanied by a local blacksmith and a parson as his guides, attempting to recross to the Union side after midnight when he was captured by Confederate artillerymen sent to guard the dam he used for the crossing. When questioned, Palmer gave his name as "W.J. Peters," and claimed to be an engineer on an inspection trip. He was interrogated by General William N. Pendleton, who thought he was a spy. He was detained and sent to Richmond, Virginia, with a rambling note from Pendleton that was ignored.

Palmer was incarcerated at the notorious Castle Thunder prison on Tobacco Row, Richmond where his true identity was never uncovered. Doubts about his identity were apparently reinforced by publication of a fictitious dispatch in the Philadelphia newspapers that purported that Palmer was in Washington, D.C., after scouting in Virginia. When he was freed after four months of confinement, he found that his guide, the Reverend J.J. Stine, had escaped but been arrested by Union authorities, accused of betraying him to the enemy. Rather than risk Palmer's life by publication of the circumstances in the Northern press, Stine had remained imprisoned in Fort Delaware until Palmer's personal application to Secretary of War Edwin Stanton resulted in his release.

Palmer was set free in a prisoner exchange for a prominent Richmond citizen, recuperated two weeks, and rejoined his regiment in February 1863. During his period of imprisonment, the regiment had become mutinous because of a failure to have officers appointed and other enlistment inducements it felt had not been honored. 212 troopers faced court-martial and the possibility of going before a firing squad for refusing to fight in the Battle of Stone's River. Palmer reorganized the regiment, personally appointed officers in whose abilities he had great trust, and had the charges against the confined soldiers dropped on the condition that they behaved going forward. The severely demoralized group of men rallied and distinguished themselves during the 1863 Tullahoma Campaign, the Battle of Chickamauga, the capture of Brig. Gen. Robert B. Vance's raiding cavalry and re-capture of 28 wagons of a foraging train in January 1864, and the Franklin–Nashville Campaign.

At Chickamauga, Palmer's regiment was detailed as headquarters guard for the Army of the Cumberland with many troopers doled out to the various corps as couriers and scouts. When Longstreet unexpectedly attacked the union right near Rosecrans' headquarters, Palmer gathered all the men of his regiment available and prepared to counterattack with a saber charge. The Union right flank dissolved, however, and after attempting to rally the panicked infantry, his regiment crossed the battlefield in good order under Confederate artillery fire to protect the Union artillery. During the army's retreat to Chattanooga, the 15th Pennsylvania provided escort for the army's supply train. Not easily impressed, Major General George H. Thomas (the "Rock of Chickamauga") recommended that Palmer receive a brigadier's star for his success at turning a highly demoralized group of men to an effective group of soldiers.

Palmer was vigorous in pursuing Confederate General John Bell Hood after the Battle of Nashville in 1864. On March 9, 1865, President Abraham Lincoln nominated Palmer for appointment to the brevet grade of brigadier general of volunteers at the age of 28, with the U.S. Senate confirming the appointment on March 10, 1865. On March 16 he was promoted to command of the 1st Brigade of the Cavalry Division, District of East Tennessee, consisting of the 15th Pennsylvania, the 10th Michigan, and the 12th Ohio Cavalry Regiments. A month later he assumed command of the division after General Alvan C. Gillem was promoted to command of the District of East Tennessee. Palmer was in the vanguard of Union General George Stoneman's 1865 Raid into Virginia and North Carolina in the last two months of the Civil War. At Martinsville, Virginia on April 8, 1865, Palmer's cavalry defeated a Confederate force of Cavalry commanded by Colonel James Wheeler, the cousin of Confederate Cavalry commander Fighting Joe Wheeler. If Palmer had pushed on to Danville, only 20 miles to the north, he might very well have captured Jefferson Davis, who up till then had not left the capital of the Confederacy. Davis subsequently left the next day, upon receiving word of Lee's surrender. This was a little-known campaign immortalized in The Band's epic, "The Night They Drove Old Dixie Down".

Palmer commanded the cavalry pursuit of Jefferson Davis following the surrender by General Joseph E. Johnston. Davis was followed through North Carolina, South Carolina, and Georgia and driven into the hands of General James H. Wilson. During the pursuit, Palmer's former command overtook and captured wagons carrying millions of dollars of specie, bonds, securities, notes, and other Confederate assets, near Covington, Georgia, that had been kept in the Bank of Macon (Georgia). Palmer was mustered out of the Union Army on June 21, 1865.

General George Henry Thomas wrote of Palmer:

There is no officer in the regular or volunteer service who has performed the duties which have devolved upon him with more intelligence, zeal, or energy than General Palmer, whose uniform distinguished success throughout the war places his reputation beyond controversy.

On February 24, 1894, Palmer was awarded the Medal of Honor for his actions as colonel leading the 15th Pennsylvania Cavalry at Red Hill, Alabama, January 14, 1865, where "with less than 200 men, [he] attacked and defeated a superior force of the enemy, captured their fieldpiece and about 100 prisoners without losing a man." Six former officers of the 15th Pennsylvania Cavalry had nominated him the previous October to receive the honor, but for the scouting efforts in mufti during the Antietam Campaign that resulted in his capture. The War Department rejected that nomination on the basis that the acts, while valorous, had not been performed of a field of battle. They then submitted a new nomination for the action at Red Hill, which was approved.

== Western railroads ==
=== Kansas Pacific Railway ===
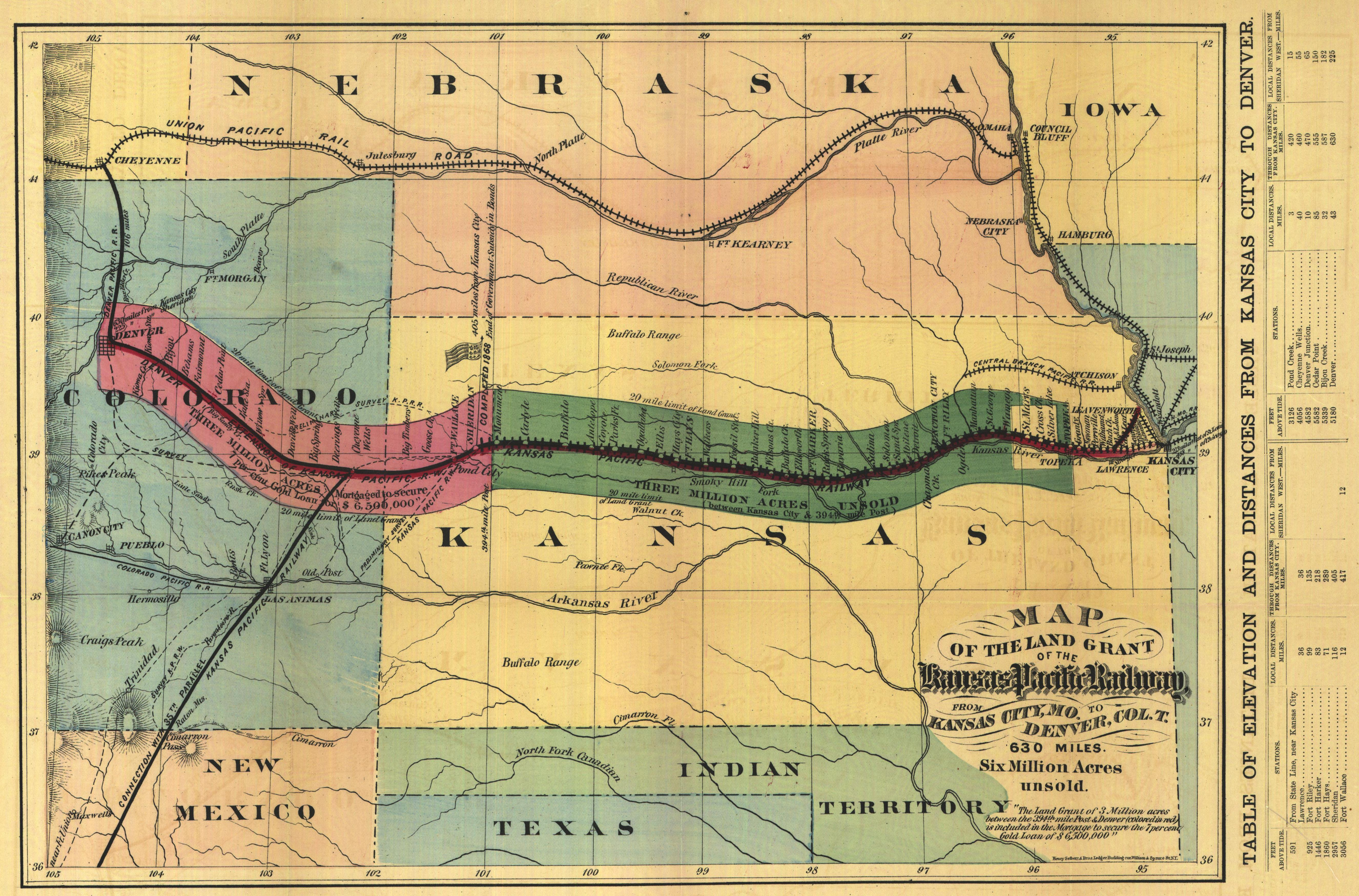
The Kansas Pacific main line shown on an 1869 map. The thickened portion along the line indicates the extent of the land grants available to settlers. At the time of the map, the line extended only as far as western Kansas (section in green). The extension to the Colorado Territory (section in red) was completed the following year

After the War, Palmer resumed the railroad career he had started previous to the conflict. In 1867, a very optimistic, eager 30-year-old Palmer, and his 21-year-old chief assistant Edward Hibberd Johnson, headed west from their hometown of Philadelphia, Pennsylvania. Palmer worked the Kansas Pacific Railway first as secretary and treasurer and then as managing director responsible for extending service through south central Colorado. With Kansas Pacific chief engineer Colonel William Henry Greenwood, Palmer organized a surveying expedition that recommended in 1868 that the route to the coast be diverted at Ellsworth, Kansas, to Pueblo, Colorado, and through the Royal Gorge to the San Luis Valley where it would turn south to Santa Fe, New Mexico. The route was rejected by the Kansas Pacific's board of directors in favor of a line through Denver, which was completed in 1870.

=== Denver and Rio Grande Railway ===
While in the Colorado Territory, Palmer went to Colorado City (now Old Colorado City) to consider a north-south route from Denver for his own railway. Palmer had a vision to build a railroad south from Denver through New Mexico and El Paso to Mexico City. Palmer founded—with Greenwood, Colonel D.C. Dodge, former Colorado territorial Governor Alexander Cameron Hunt, Charles B. Lambord (Note: Lambord had been lieutenant colonel of the 15th Pennsylvania Cavalry under Palmer.) and others—and was elected president of the Denver and Rio Grande Railroad in 1870.

The first section of the railway included the first 3 ft (914 mm) narrow gauge railroad tracks in the West. The line ran south of Denver and across the Palmer Divide, which separates the Platte River and Arkansas River watersheds, and to Colorado Springs by 1871. The line went to Pueblo in 1872, and further south to coal fields beyond Trinidad in April 1876. The railroad had service along the Arkansas River canyon to other coal mining locations, to the metal mining town of Leadville, and the iron mines in Saguache County, Colorado. Palmer stepped down as president in 1883 to focus greater attention on developing the Mexican line.

=== Rio Grande Western Railway ===
Palmer was president of the Rio Grande Western Railway from 1881 or 1883 to 1901. He built lines from the terminus of the Denver and Rio Grande Western Railway in Grand Junction to the Utah cities of Ogden and Salt Lake City. This provided direct service from Denver to Utah via narrow-gauge railway.

=== Mexican National Railway ===
In the spring of 1880, Palmer was made president of the Mexican National Railway (now National Railroad of Mexico). He hired Greenwood again as chief engineer in May, only to have Greenwood robbed and murdered on a survey near Mexico City on August 29. Most of the line was completed by 1883 when the railroad reached Mexico City.

== Colorado Springs and Manitou Springs ==
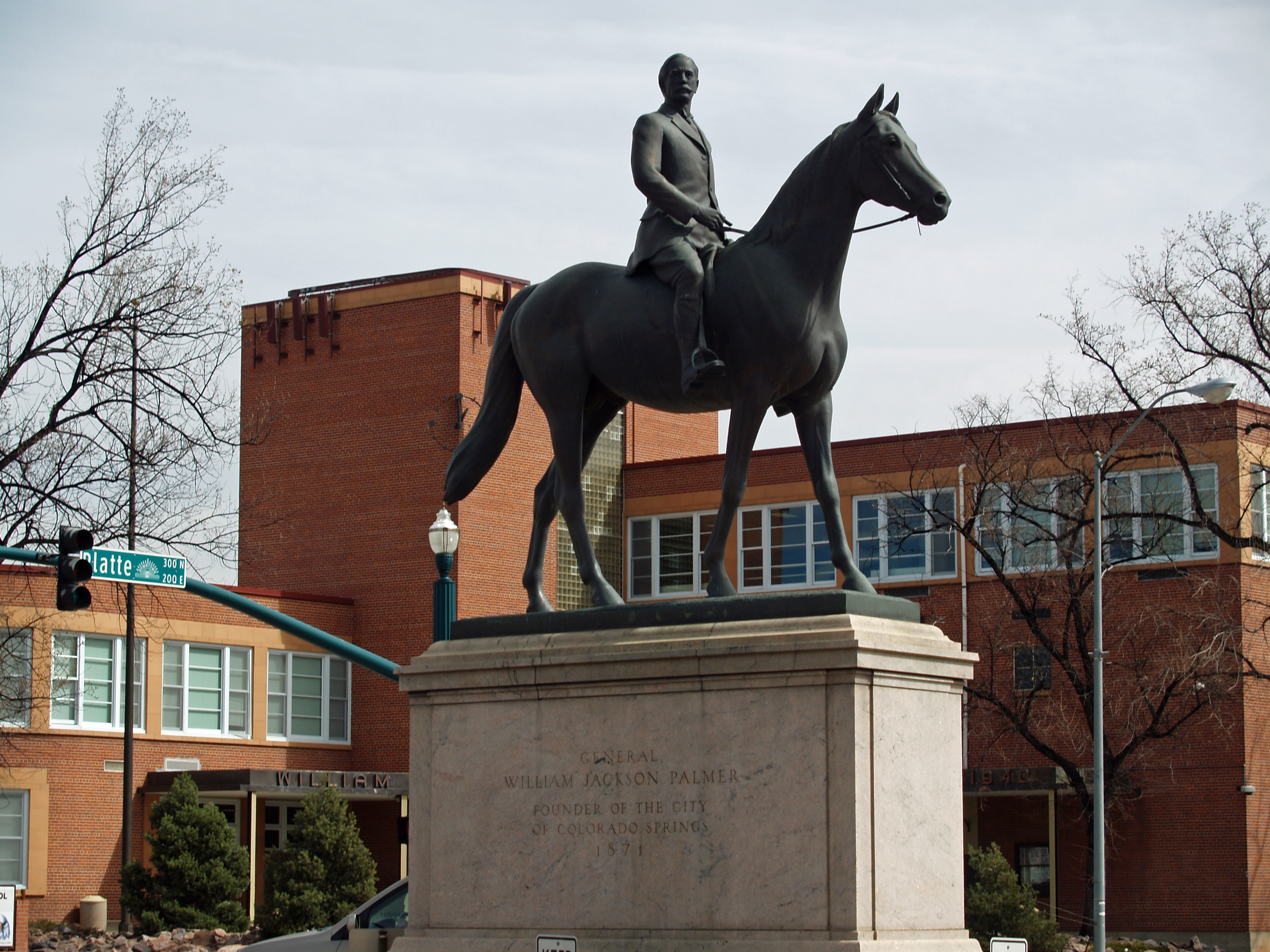
Statue of General William Jackson Palmer, 1929, intersection of Platte and Nevada Avenues, Colorado Springs. The statue was funded through donations to the William Jackson Palmer Memorial Association.

Palmer came to the Colorado Territory as a surveyor with the Kansas Pacific Railway in search of possible railroad routes. Dr. William Abraham Bell from England was also part of the survey party. On July 31, 1871, Palmer and Bell founded Fountain Colony (later Colorado Springs), downstream of Colorado City, and it was laid out by the Colorado Springs Company that year. (Note: In reaction to the saloons, prostitution, and opium dens of Colorado City, Palmer purchased the land for the new town east of the wild town and outlawed the consumption of alcohol within the new town's borders. Alcohol was sold, however, by druggists for "medicinal purposes". In 1933, at the end of Prohibition, Colorado Springs lifted the ban of the sale and consumption of alcohol.) It was named for springs found along Monument Creek as early as 1871. Four chalybeate mineral springs were later discovered along Monument Creek in October 1880.

He also founded the town of Manitou (later Manitou Springs) as a resort town at the base of Pikes Peak. Palmer spent about $1,000,000 (equivalent to $36,698,276 in 2025) on the construction of roads and development of parks in Manitou Springs, Old Colorado City, Colorado Springs, and Manitou Park.

In Colorado Springs, Palmer provided funding for Colorado College and within two years, Colorado Springs the town had 1,500 residents, schools, churches, banks, and a newspaper. Palmer donated land to establish the first city park, Acacia, and additional parks: Antlers Park, Monument Valley Park, North Cheyenne Cañon Park, Palmer Park, Pioneer Square Park (South Park), Prospect Lake and Bear Creek Cañon Park. He donated a total of 1,270 acres of land, some of which was also used for scenic drives, tree-lined roadways and foot and bridle paths. Palmer also provided the land and funding for the Colorado School for the Deaf and Blind, a tuberculosis sanatorium, and multiple libraries. With the land that he gave for parks, churches, libraries, hospitals, and schools, he donated a total of 1,638 acres. Palmer also founded the Colorado Springs Gazette newspaper.

In 1883, he built the Antlers Hotel. When it burned down in 1898, he rebuilt the hotel with Italian Renaissance architecture. (Note: The Antlers, built in 1898, was replaced about 1948 with the current, modern Antlers Hotel.) In 1901 Palmer honored Zebulon Montgomery Pike with a marble statue placed near the main entrance of the hotel. In 1904, Palmer located a mineral spring that had been used by the Denver and Rio Grande Railroad company in 1871, but was covered in sands by flooding along Monument Creek; he next directed engineers to install a concrete vault to maintain the spring water's purity and a hand pump to bring water to the surface. Palmer announced his intention to build a pavilion and to name the spring after Zebulon Pike’s Indian guide, Chief Tahama, also known as "Rising Moose."

Other towns were founded by Palmer along his railroad lines, include Salida, Alamosa, and Durango.

== Colorado Coal and Iron Company ==
Palmer envisioned "an integrated industrial complex based on steel manufacturing" in which all necessary resources were controlled by one company. In 1880, Palmer constructed Colorado Coal and Iron Company's (CC&I) steel mill south of Pueblo and laid out the town of Bessemer (now incorporated in Pueblo). The Minnequa plant became one of the greatest iron and steel plants in the country. His dream became a reality for his successors when, in 1892, CC&I merged with the Colorado Fuel Company to form Colorado Fuel and Iron.

== Personal life ==
Over the course of his life, Palmer was a member of the Denver Club, Colorado Springs Country Club, El Paso Country Club, City Midday Club (New York), and the Metropolitan Club (New York).

=== Marriage ===
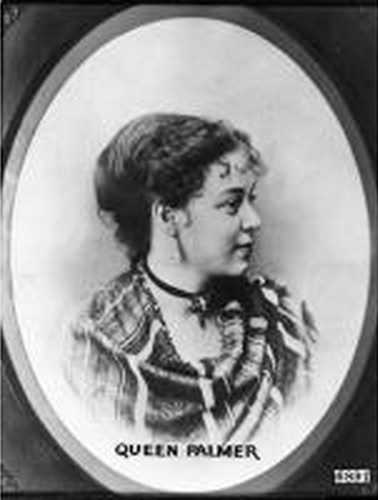
Mary Lincoln (Queen) Mellen Palmer, wife of William Jackson Palmer

Palmer met Mary Lincoln (Queen) Mellen in April 1869 while she and her father, William Proctor Mellen, were on a train returning from a trip to see the West. They were married November 7, 1870, in Flushing, New York, where the Mellen family lived at the time. They spent their honeymoon in Europe. They had three daughters, Elsie, Dorothy, and Marjory.

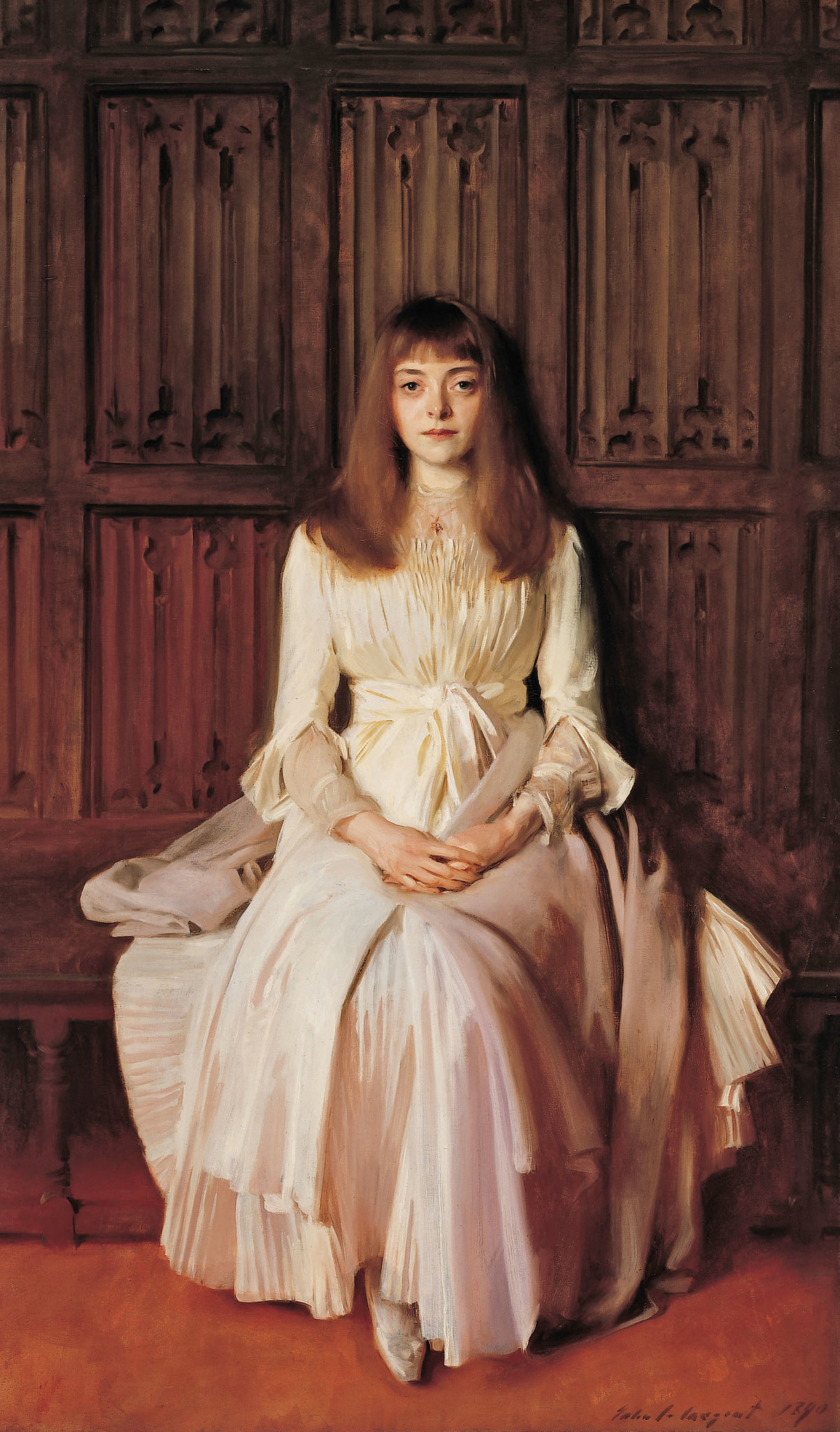
Miss Elsie Palmer, John Singer Sargent, painted at Ightham 1889-90

Palmer built a house that would eventually become Glen Eyrie Castle, Scottish for "Valley of the Eagle's Nest," in 1871 near Colorado Springs, as a home for his wife and family. While they lived there, Queen taught at Colorado Springs' first school.

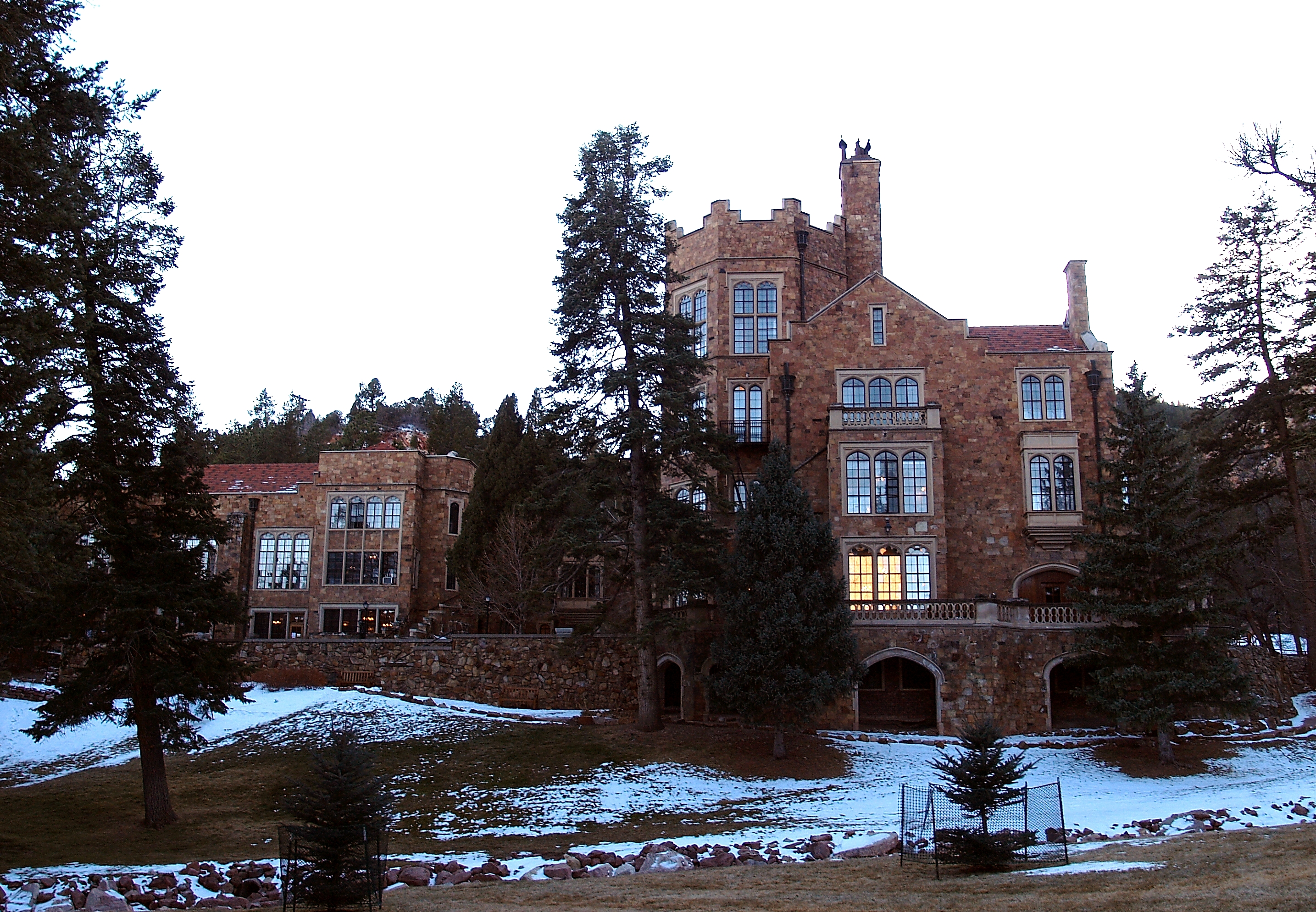
Glen Eyrie in Colorado Springs is now open to the public.

Palmer had apartments in London and New York, a castle near Mexico City, and property throughout Colorado. The Palmers traveled frequently with their children and governesses to New York and London for William's business and lived part-time at Glen Eyrie in Colorado.

Queen was of frail health, possibly aggravated by living at high altitude. While pregnant with their middle daughter Dorothy in 1880, Queen suffered a heart attack in Leadville during a vacation. Dorothy was born a few weeks later at Glen Eyrie. Then, their third daughter, Marjorie, was born in England. Two maids and a doctor had accompanied them on the trip. Over the next four years, Queen often lived on the East Coast or England, with visits by Palmer. In 1885, she left Glen Eyrie permanently, due to ongoing health concerns, and needing to live at a lower altitude, she returned to her home in England. In about 1887, Queen began renting Ightham Mote in Kent, where she lived for 3 years. William and Queen vacationed in France and Italy in the spring of 1889. Following other heart attacks which prevented any return to Colorado, Queen died in England on December 27, 1894, at the age of 44.

=== Retirement ===
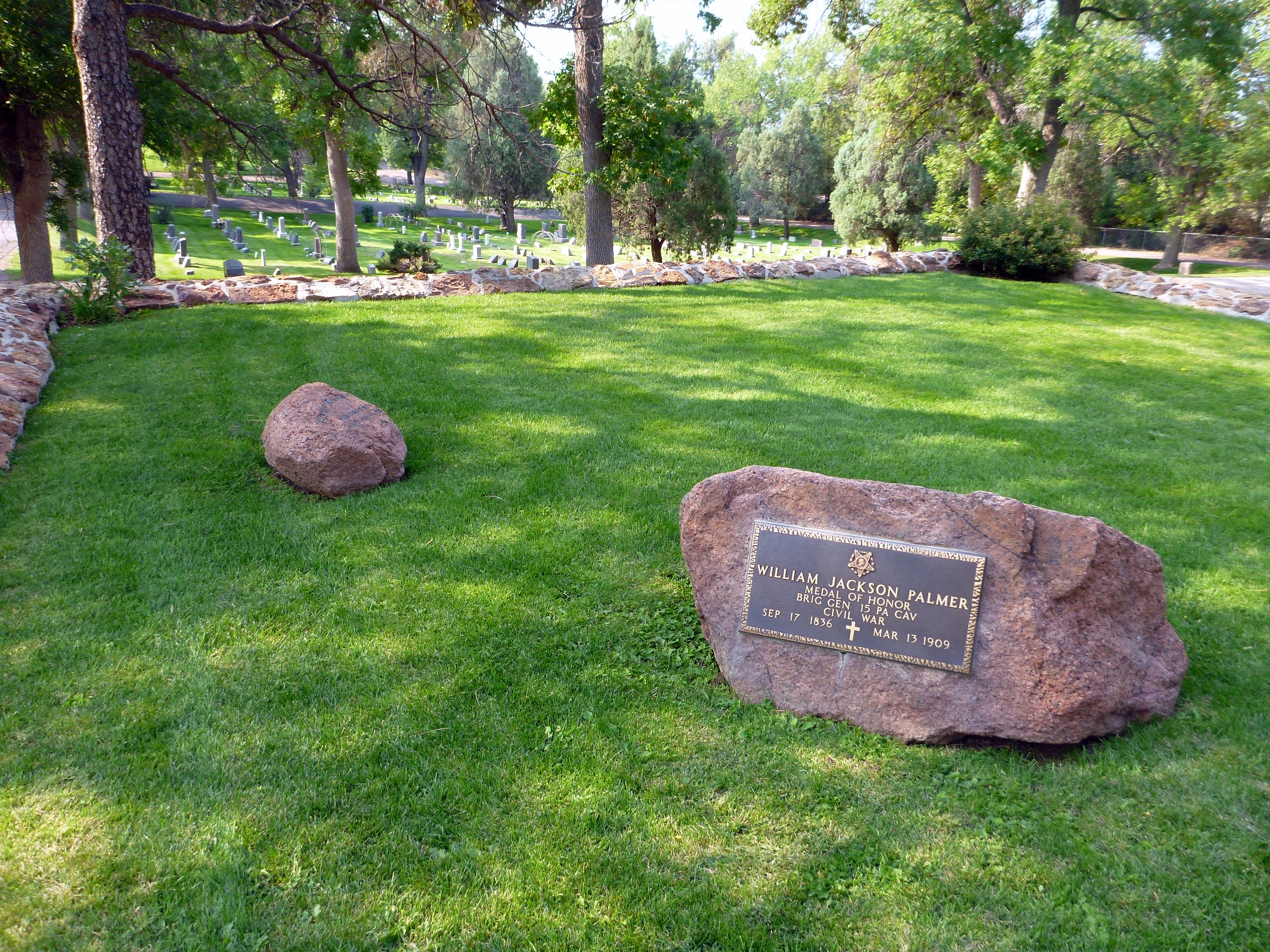
William Jackson Palmer's grave, Evergreen Cemetery, Colorado Springs, Colorado

When Palmer retired from business, he devoted himself to philanthropic endeavors, giving away $4 million (equivalent to $143,333,333 in 2025). In the autumn of 1906, Palmer suffered a fall from a horse and was partially paralyzed. Palmer sustained a C6 incomplete spinal cord injury, which would have paralyzed him from the neck down, making him a quadriplegic.

Unable to travel, Palmer hosted the veterans of his 15th Pennsylvania Volunteer Regiment troopers for their annual reunion in August 1907 at Glen Eyrie. He provided a special train and paid the travel expenses for 208 of about 260 surviving veterans. Mrs. J.A. Hayes, the wife of a prominent Colorado Springs banker and daughter of Jefferson Davis, was an honored guest at the reunion.

William Jackson Palmer died on March 13, 1909, at the age of 72. On the day of his death schools, businesses, and trains stopped and flags flew at half mast in Colorado Springs. The mayor said Palmer was "the soldier, the builder of an empire, the philanthropist, the friend of the people, whose life was a blessing." Gazette journalist Dave Philipps said that he was "an ardent pacifist, humanitarian and champion of preserving wildlands at a time when conservation was almost unheard of." His and Queen's ashes are buried at Evergreen Cemetery in Colorado Springs, Colorado.

== Legacy ==
- Palmer made significant donations to the Hampton University in Virginia, a university built after the end of the Civil War for African-Americans, and Palmer Hall was named in his honor.
- Palmer was the land-grantor of several institutions in Colorado Springs, including the (International Typographical Union's) Union Printer's Home, the Colorado School for the Deaf and Blind, several churches in central Colorado Springs, and Cragmor Sanatorium, a tuberculosis sanitarium which later was re-founded in 1965 as the University of Colorado Colorado Springs (UCCS).
- He provided land and funding for the creation of Colorado College and was one of its founding trustees. Palmer Hall, the main social science building on the Colorado College campus, is named for the General.
- Queen Palmer Elementary School in Colorado Springs is named in honor of Palmer's wife, Mary (Queen) Mellen Palmer; General William J. Palmer High School in downtown Colorado Springs and Lewis-Palmer High School in nearby Monument are named for the general himself.
- Palmer Divide, a geographic feature north of Colorado Springs, and the community of Palmer Lake, Colorado, are named after him, as is Palmer Park in Colorado Springs.
- In 1952 Paramount Pictures released the film Denver and Rio Grande, a fictional dramatization of the building of the railroad during the "Royal Gorge War", using research material provided by the railroad. Palmer is flatteringly portrayed by Dean Jagger.
- Palmer founded the General Palmer Hotel in 1898, originally the Palace Hotel, in Durango Colorado, where it is still in operation.
- In 1962, he was inducted into the Hall of Great Westerners of the National Cowboy & Western Heritage Museum.

== Medal of Honor citation ==

Colonel William J. Palmer of the 15th Pennsylvania Cavalry received the Medal of Honor on February 24, 1894 for his service on Red Hill, Alabama on January 14, 1865: "With less than 200 men, attacked and defeated a superior force of the enemy, capturing their fieldpiece and about 100 prisoners without losing a man."

The medal is on permanent display at the Colorado Springs Pioneer Museum.

== See also ==
- List of American Civil War Medal of Honor recipients: M–P
- List of American Civil War brevet generals (Union)
