= John Tweedale =

US Army officer and Medal of Honor recipient

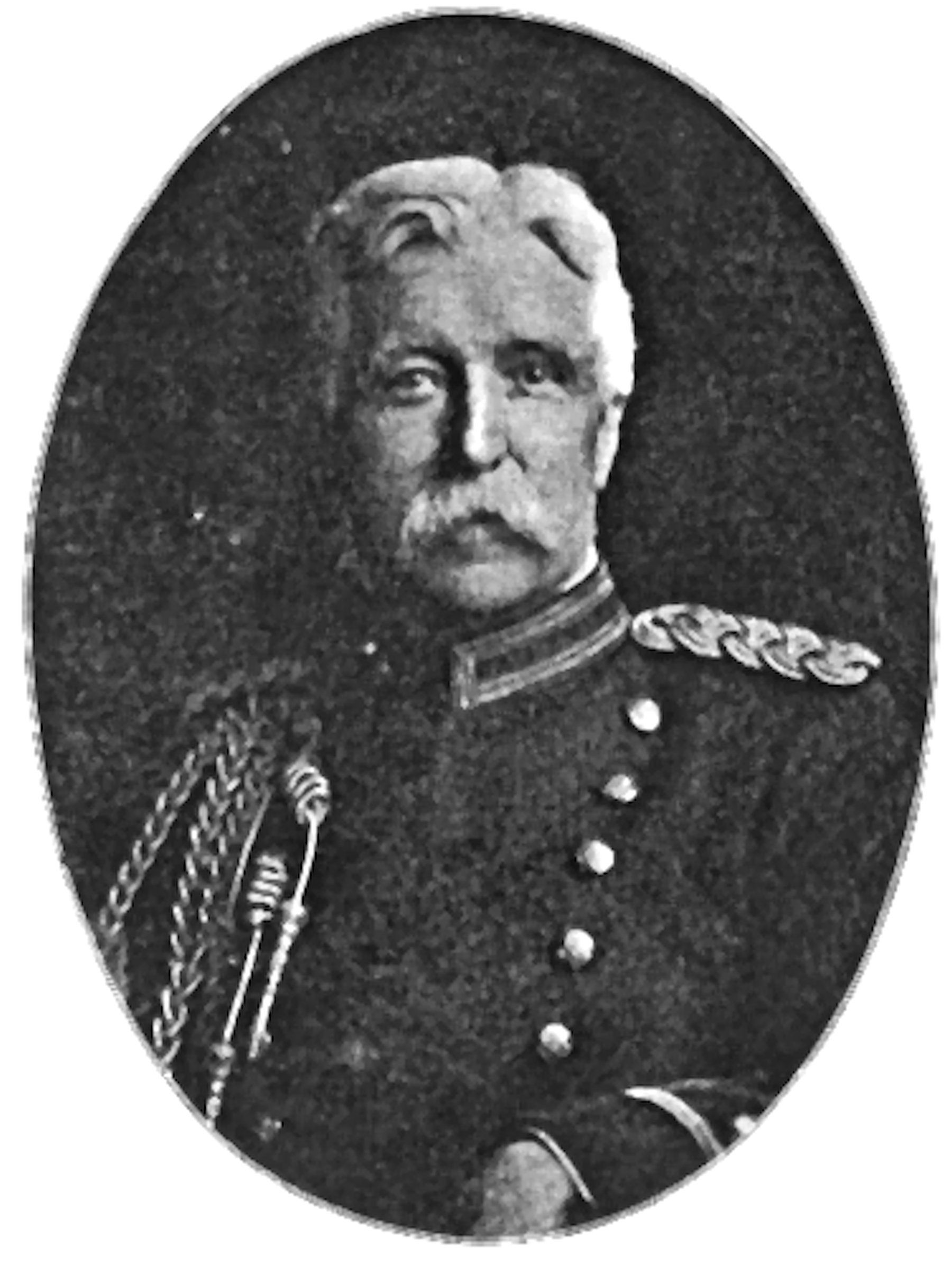
- John Tweedale
- Born: June 10, 1841; Frankford, Pennsylvania, US
- Died: December 21, 1920 (aged 79); Washington, D.C., US
- Burial place: Arlington National Cemetery
- Military career
- Allegiance: United States of America; Union
- Branch: United States Army; Union Army
- Service years: 1862–65, 1899–1905
- Rank: Colonel
- Unit: 15th Pennsylvania Cavalry
- Conflicts: American Civil War: Battle of Stones River
- Awards: Medal of Honor
- Other work: War Department clerk

John Tweedale (June 10, 1841 – December 21, 1920) was a Union Army soldier during the American Civil War and a recipient of America's highest military decoration the Medal of Honor for his actions at the Battle of Stones River.

== Post war ==
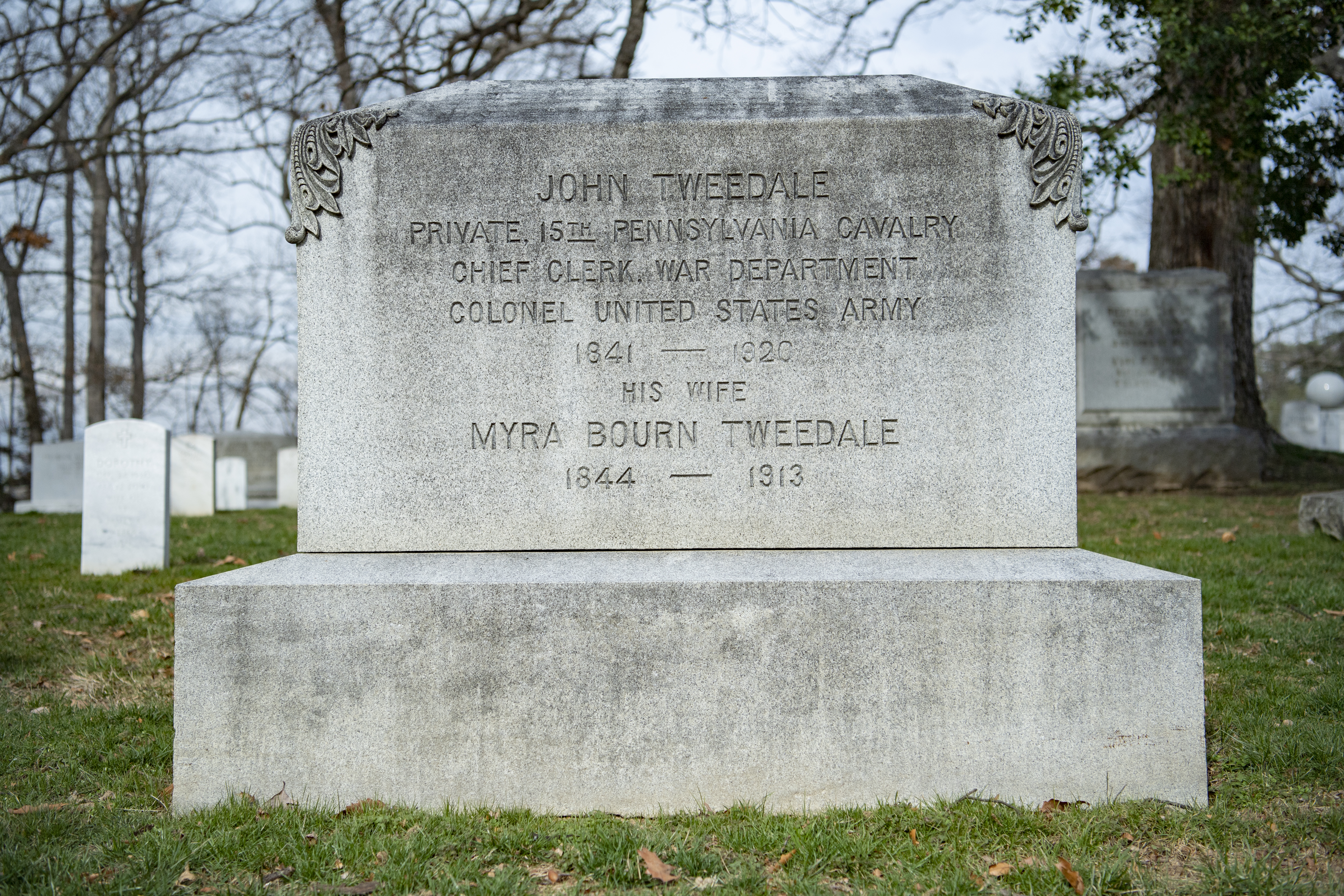
Grave at Arlington National Cemetery

Tweedale received a LL.B. degree from Columbian University (now George Washington University) of Washington, D.C. in 1868. After receiving his commission in the Army, he became Chief Clerk of the War Department. and confirmed by Congress on April 27, 1904, as Assistant Adjutant General with the rank of lieutenant colonel. He retired June 10, 1905 with the rank of colonel.

Tweedale was buried at Arlington National Cemetery, Arlington, Virginia, Plot: Section 1, Lot 470.

== Medal of Honor citation ==
Rank and Organization: Private, Company B, 15th Pennsylvania Cavalry.
Place and date: At Stones River, Tenn., December 31, 1862 to January 1, 1863.
Entered service at: Philadelphia, Pa.
Born: June 10, 1841, Frankford, Pa.
Date of issue: November 18, 1887.

Citation:

Gallantry in action.

== See also ==
- List of Medal of Honor recipients
- List of American Civil War Medal of Honor recipients: T–Z
