= Bessemer (Pueblo) =

- Neighborhood and former city
- Bessemer on a map of Colorado
- Coordinates: 38.244105°N 104.62074°W
- Country: United States
- State: Colorado
- County: Pueblo
- Municipality: Pueblo
- Founded: 1880
- Incorporated: July 15, 1886
- Consolidated: March 21, 1894

Bessemer, Colorado was a city in Colorado that was incorporated in 1886. The community was named after Henry Bessemer, an English inventor. It was one of four adjacent towns settled after the Colorado Gold Rush of 1859. The communities of South Pueblo, Central Pueblo, Pueblo, and Bessemer were later merged to create the modern City of Pueblo, Colorado. Bessemer was an independent city until 1894 and was the last city to join Pueblo. The former community of Bessemer is sometimes now referred to as the Bessemer neighborhood. Its also known as the Bessemer area. The Bessemer area is home to both Bessemer Academy (an elementary school) and Ray Aguilera Park (Formerly known as Bessemer Park and Minnequa Park).

== Geography ==
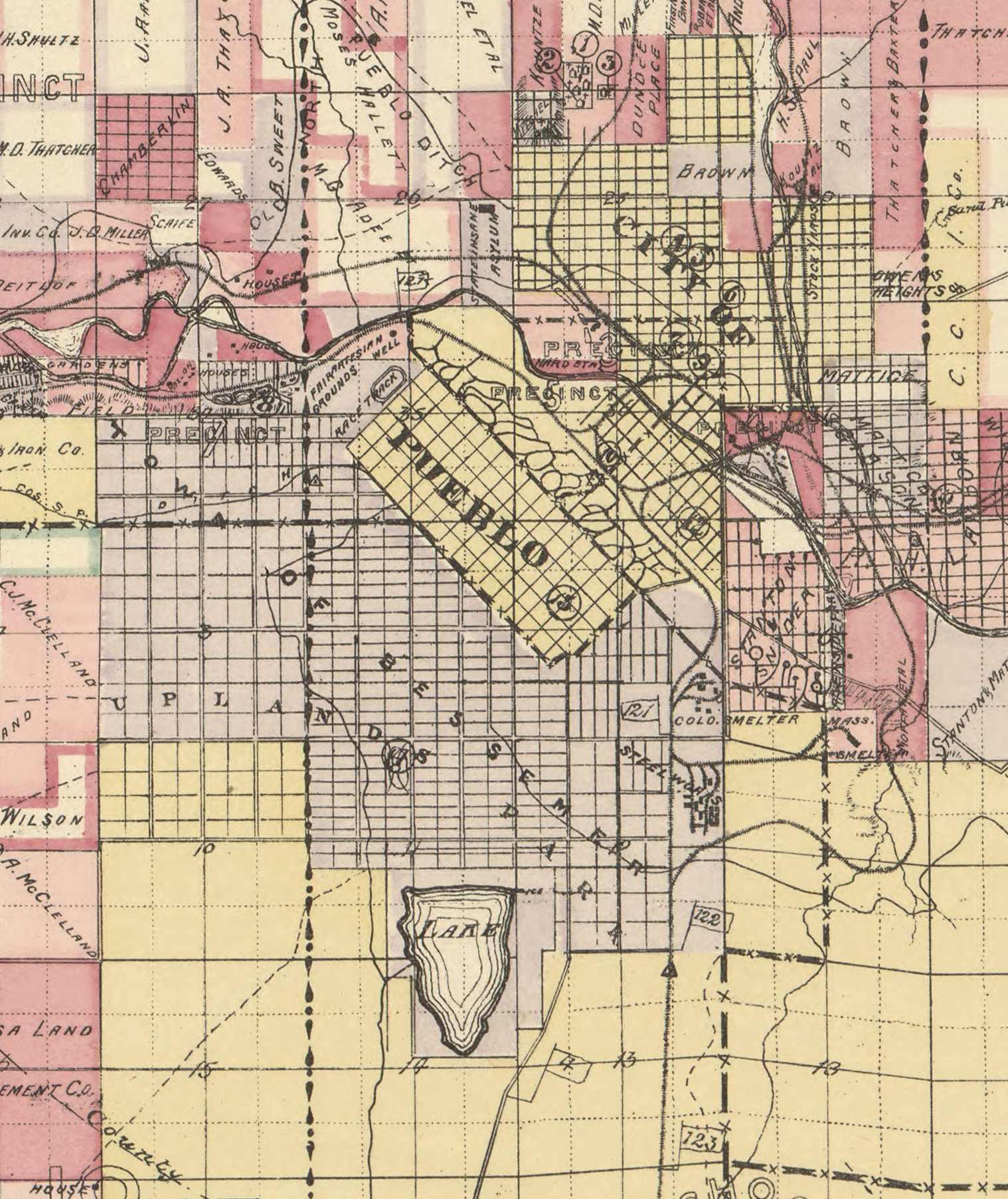
Town of Bessemer and City of Pueblo in 1888.

The plat for Bessemer was recorded on 20 August 1886 with the Pueblo County Clerk. The town was bounded to the east by the steel mill, to the west by Prairie and Western avenues (now Pueblo Boulevard), south by Aqua Avenue and what's now called Lake Minnequa, and north by South Pueblo and River Road.

Pueblo City planner Wade Broadhead has stated what people call "Greater Bessemer" and what was studied by the Bessemer Neighborhood Context Survey is roughly bounded by South Pueblo to the north (What is now the neighborhood of Mesa Junction), Russ Avenue and the steel mill to the east, Reno Avenue in the south and Berkley Avenue to the west. Lake Minnequa and Minnequa Heights are both included.

The Bessemer Historic Study states Bessemer refers to the area roughly bounded by Washington Street to the north, Berkley Avenue to the west, Interstate 25 to the east, and Streator Avenue in the south. It notes that Lake Minnequa and the area surrounding the former Edison School and Eilers Smelter site are included. This area was historically known as Laibach (also as Bojon Town) and more recently as Eilers Heights. Parts of Minnequa Heights are also included in the study.

Bessemer is almost completely flat with the exception of a slight gain in elevation towards the southern section of the neighborhood. A depression was transformed into a man-made lake, now known as Lake Minnequa. The Laibach Subdivision is situated on a bluff overlooking the Grove neighborhood.

== History ==
In February 1880, men working for the Colorado Coal and Iron Company (CC&I) began surveying the land for the company's first plant, the South Pueblo Ironworks. The rapidly expanding plant produced 284 tons of pig iron that year and 6,392 tons the next. Rather than travel back and forth from South Pueblo, workers began to settle around the plant. As the labor force grew, so to did the number of makeshift housing. By 1882 CC&I had surveyed the town of Bessemer, but a plat was not filed until 1886. The 1886 plat was greatly expanded from the unfilled 1882 plat and encircled South Pueblo. The 1886 Pueblo City Directory lists 188 identified residents in Bessemer that year. In 1887 CC&I refiled an amended plat that reduced the size of Bessemer to that of the unfilled 1882 plat.

In 1892, CC&I merged with the Colorado Fuel Company to form the Colorado Fuel and Iron Company (CF&I), and the company and the town were both forced to quickly contend with the Panic of 1893. Between the merger and the year 1899 there were no new subdivisions built in Bessemer.

In January 1894, Bessemer citizens petitioned both Bessemer and Pueblo aldermen for annexation, and the Pueblo City Council responded by ordering a special election on March 18, 1894. Pueblo voters approved the annexation 537 to 200 and Bessemer residents approved it 212 to 176, with the annexation being certified on March 21, 1894.

The local newspaper, The Bessemer Indicator, began publishing in 1890 (it later became The Indicator), in January 1905 The Indicator reported that Bessemer's population had grown from 4,000 people in 1894 to 15,000 in that year.

Bessemer's first city hall was built by the CC&I at the southeast corner of Charles Street (now Abriendo Avenue) and Central Avenue. The second city hall was built in 1890 at 1207 East Evans Avenue, but it was demolished by the Works Progress Administration between 1939–1940.

Bessemer's growth stalled in the 20s and 30s, when CFI&I's profits were at an ebb. By the 1960s the neighborhood had entered a steep decline. Few buildings were constructed in Bessemer after 1960 due to the financial state of CF&I, with only 112 new buildings erected between 1961–2010. The collapse of the US steel industry in the 80s hit the already faltering neighborhood especially hard.
