= Anderson Troop =

Independent cavalry company of the Union Army

- Active: November 30, 1861 to March 24, 1863
- Country: United States
- Allegiance: Union
- Branch: Cavalry
- Engagements: Battle of Shiloh; Siege of Corinth; Battle of Perryville; Battle of Stones River

Anderson Troop was an independent cavalry company that served in the Union Army during the American Civil War. It had an authorized strength of 110 officers and men, and served for 18 months at the headquarters of Generals Don Carlos Buell and William S. Rosecrans, commanders of the Department and Army of the Ohio and Cumberland. The unit was frequently referred to as "Anderson Troop, Pennsylvania Cavalry", and while occasionally identified as the 15th Pennsylvania Cavalry because its officers raised and organized that regiment, it was never a part.

== Service ==
The Anderson Troop was organized at Carlisle, Pennsylvania, in October–November 1861 and mustered in on November 30, 1861, under the command of Captain William Jackson Palmer of Philadelphia, its organizer. The company was raised for headquarters and escort duty with Gen. Robert Anderson in Kentucky but instead became a unit of "elite scouts." Palmer, a Quaker, recruited a number of men of his faith to serve in the company, and all members were hand-picked after nomination by upstanding citizens of Pennsylvania. Among the requirements for enrollment was an oath to abstain from consumption of liquor for the duration.

In July 1862 Captain Palmer, 1st Lt. William Spencer, and 12 men were detailed to raise three additional companies of similar recruits to form a battalion to be known as the 1st Anderson Cavalry, with the Anderson Troop as its Company A. The recruiters, however, received sufficient applications to raise an entire regiment, which was authorized and became the 15th Pennsylvania Volunteer Cavalry. Palmer left the troop to become colonel of the 15th and Spencer the lieutenant colonel.

Although known as the "Anderson Cavalry," the regiment nonetheless did not incorporate the company into its ranks when it elected to remain independent under the command of its second lieutenant, Thomas Maple. Eleven of its 17 officers and non-commissioned officers, with 21 of 90 privates, had joined the 15th, the majority of them commissioned as officers. With the 15th Pennsylvania Cavalry designated to become his headquarters cavalry, General William Rosecrans felt that the two units could not serve side-by-side without friction and offered the remaining 53 men of the Anderson Troop the opportunity to muster out of service, which was done on March 24, 1863. Maple continued in service as a major and assistant army quartermaster.

== Detailed service ==
Moved to Louisville, Ky., December 2–7, 1861. Duty there until February 1862. Moved with headquarters Army of the Ohio to Nashville, Tenn., February 24. March to Savannah, Tenn., to reinforce the Army of the Tennessee March–April. Battle of Shiloh April 7. Advance on and siege of Corinth, Miss., April 29-May 30. Pursuit to Booneville May 31-June 12. Buell's Campaign in northern Alabama and middle Tennessee June to August. March to Louisville, Ky., in pursuit of Bragg August 21-September 26. Pursuit of Bragg into Kentucky October 1–22. Springfield October 6. Battle of Perryville October 8. March to Nashville, Tenn., October 22-November 7, and duty there until December 26. Advance on Murfreesboro December 26–30. Lavergne December 26–27. Wilkinson's Cross Roads December 29. Battle of Stones River December 30–31, 1862 and January 1–3, 1863. Overall's Creek December 31, 1862. Lavergne January 1, 1863. Lytle's Creek January 5. At Murfreesboro until March 24, 1863.

== Casualties ==
The company lost a total of 6 men during service; 1 officer killed, 5 enlisted men died of disease.

== Commanders ==
- Captain William Jackson Palmer - promoted to colonel, 15th Pennsylvania Cavalry (160th Pennsylvania Volunteers), September 8, 1862
- 1st Lieutenant William Spencer - promoted to lieutenant colonel, 15th Pennsylvania Cavalry, October 1, 1862
- 2nd Lieutenant Thomas S. Maple

== See also ==
- List of Pennsylvania Civil War Units
- Pennsylvania in the Civil War
