= Minnequa Steel Works Office Building and Dispensary, Colorado Fuel and Iron Company =

- U.S. National Register of Historic Places
- U.S. National Historic Landmark
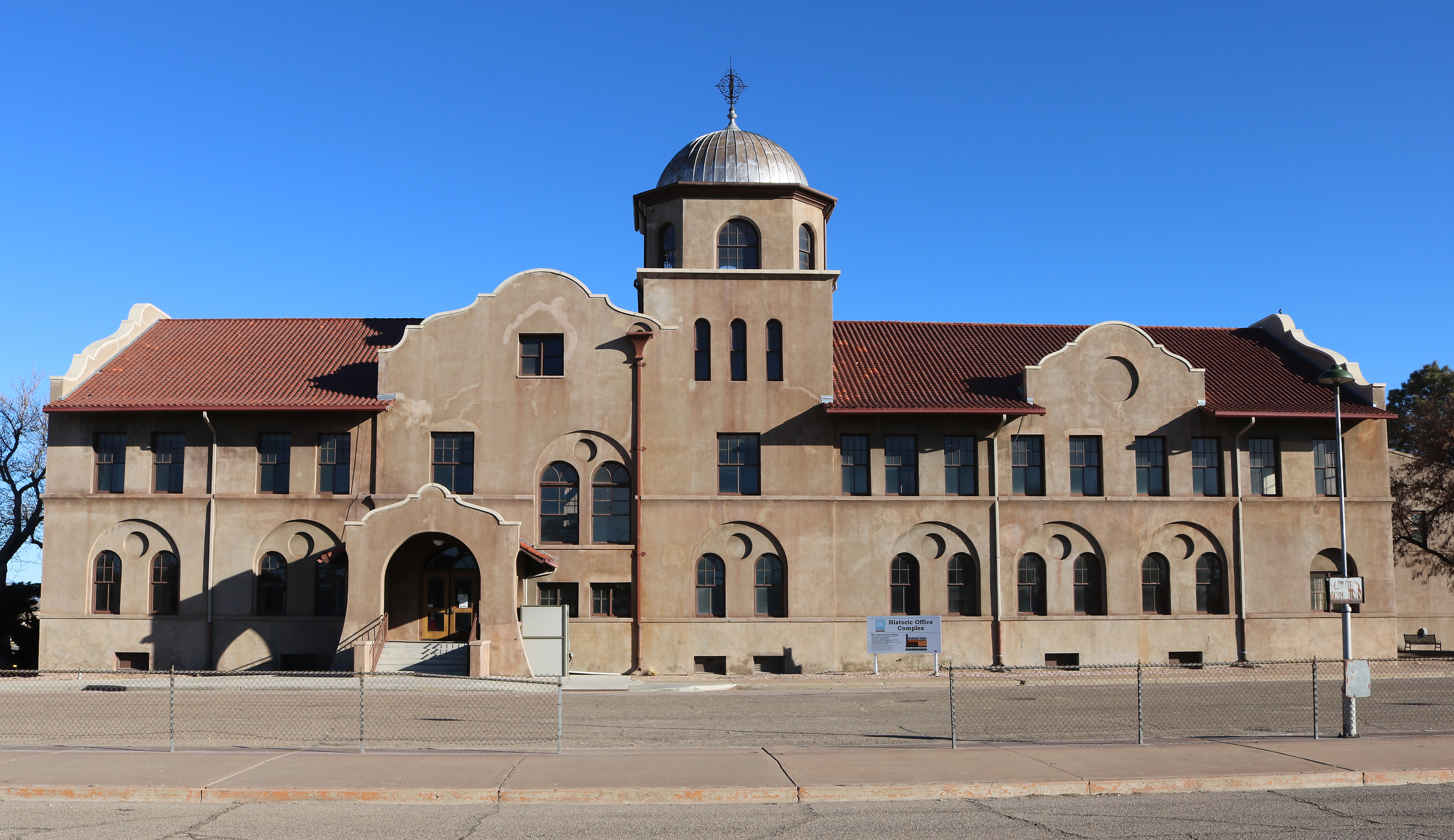
- Location: 215 and 225 Canal St., Pueblo, Colorado
- Coordinates: 38.2380°N 104.6129°W
- Built: 1901, 1902, addition 1922
- Architect: Stickney, William W., Frederick Sterner
- Architectural style: Mission/Spanish Revival
- NRHP reference No.: 02000628, 100006242

Significant dates
- Added to NRHP: July 6, 2002
- Designated NHL: January 13, 2021

The Minnequa Steel Works Office Building and Dispensary are historic buildings in Pueblo, Colorado. The main office building served as headquarters of Colorado Fuel and Iron Company. The medical dispensary building served as a medical clinic for treatment of minor injuries and illnesses, and in later years, as both clinic and personnel office for the Colorado Fuel and Iron Company. Opened in 1902, the six-room Spanish Mission style building contained waiting, drug, consultation, surgical and storage rooms, in addition to sleeping and office quarters for attending physicians. In 1902, as the company payroll exceeded 5,000 employees, the Dispensary handled an average of seventy-five cases daily. As employee numbers grew, medical staff also began treating families of employees. The building was used as a medical building for mill employees until the early 1990s. The Minnequa Steelworks Office Building, built in 1901, served as company headquarters until the early 1990s. Here, many office functions occurred including purchasing, finance, payroll, engineering, and other administrative functions. The building complex was listed on the National Register of Historic Places in 2002, amended to the National Level of Significance of the National Register of Historic Places in 2008, and was designated a National Historic Landmark in 2021. Owned and operated by the Steelworks Center of the West, the medical dispensary building is the home of the Steelworks Museum of Industry and Culture, which opened on January 19, 2007. The museum's exhibits include the local history of coal mining, steel production, railroads, labor, and the impact of the Colorado Fuel and Iron Company on the region. The main administration building will serve as the second phase of the Steelworks Museum of Industry and Culture in the coming years.

== See also ==
- National Register of Historic Places listings in Pueblo County, Colorado
- List of National Historic Landmarks in Colorado
