= Steelworks Museum =

Coordinates: 38°14′16″N 104°36′45″W

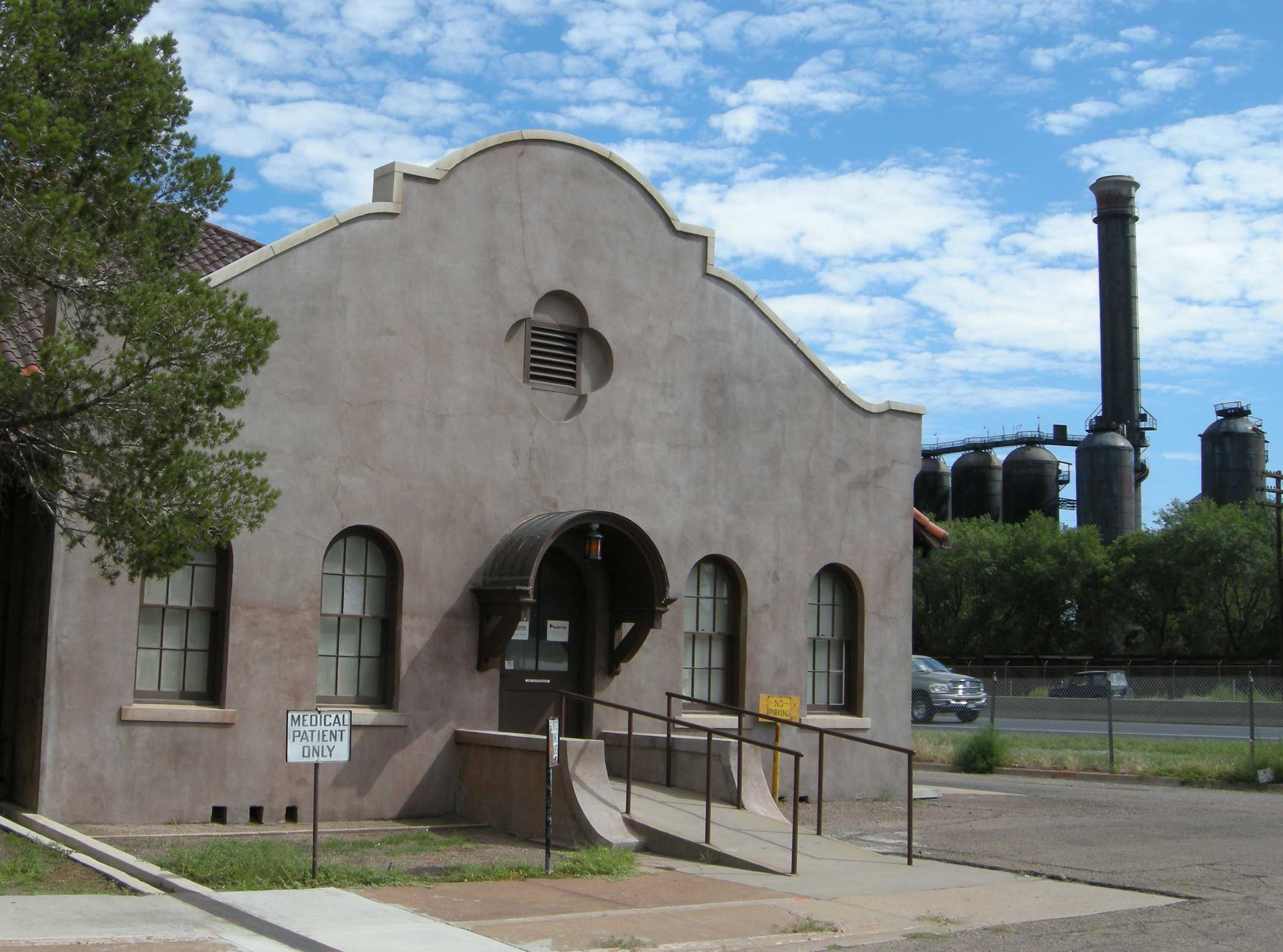
- Established: 2007
- Location: Pueblo, Colorado
- Type: Industrial museum
- Curator: Victoria Miller
- Owner: Steelworks Center of the West
- Website: steelworks.us

The Steelworks Museum is located in Pueblo, Colorado. Operated by the Steelworks Center of the West, the museum is in the historic Minnequa Steel Works Office Building and Dispensary of the Colorado Fuel and Iron Company.

The museum's exhibits include the local history of coal mining, steel production, railroads, labor, and the impact of the Colorado Fuel and Iron Company on the region.

== History ==
The Bessemer Historical Society was formed in 2000 by community members working in collaboration with the City of Pueblo, Pueblo County, and the State of Colorado to care for the archives, artifacts and historic buildings of the Colorado Fuel and Iron Company. The BHS was created as a 501(c)(3) organization.

After raising $1.7 million the BHS purchased the administrative building complex and surrounding land from Oregon Steel Mills. The complex was added to the National Register of Historic Places in 2002.

With grants from Save America’s Treasures and the National Endowment for the Humanities the CF&I archives have been processed and made available to the public. The Steelworks Archives is one of the largest publicly available corporate archives in America.

The Steelworks Museum open in 2007, as the "Steel Works Museum of Industry and Culture".

The "Bessemer Historical Society" has since changed its name to the "Steelworks Center of the West".

== Collection ==
- The Steelworks Archives, with over 6,000 cubic feet of company records, 228 films, 100,000 photographs, 30,000 maps and drawings.
- CF&I Mine Rescue Car No. 1, believed to be the only remaining wooden mine rescue car in America.
- Historic Buildings, three of CF&I's historic administration buildings.
- Preserved medical dispensary.

== See also ==
- Zollverein Coal Mine Industrial Complex
