= Colorado Fuel and Iron =

American steel company

Coordinates: 38°14′17″N 104°36′45″W

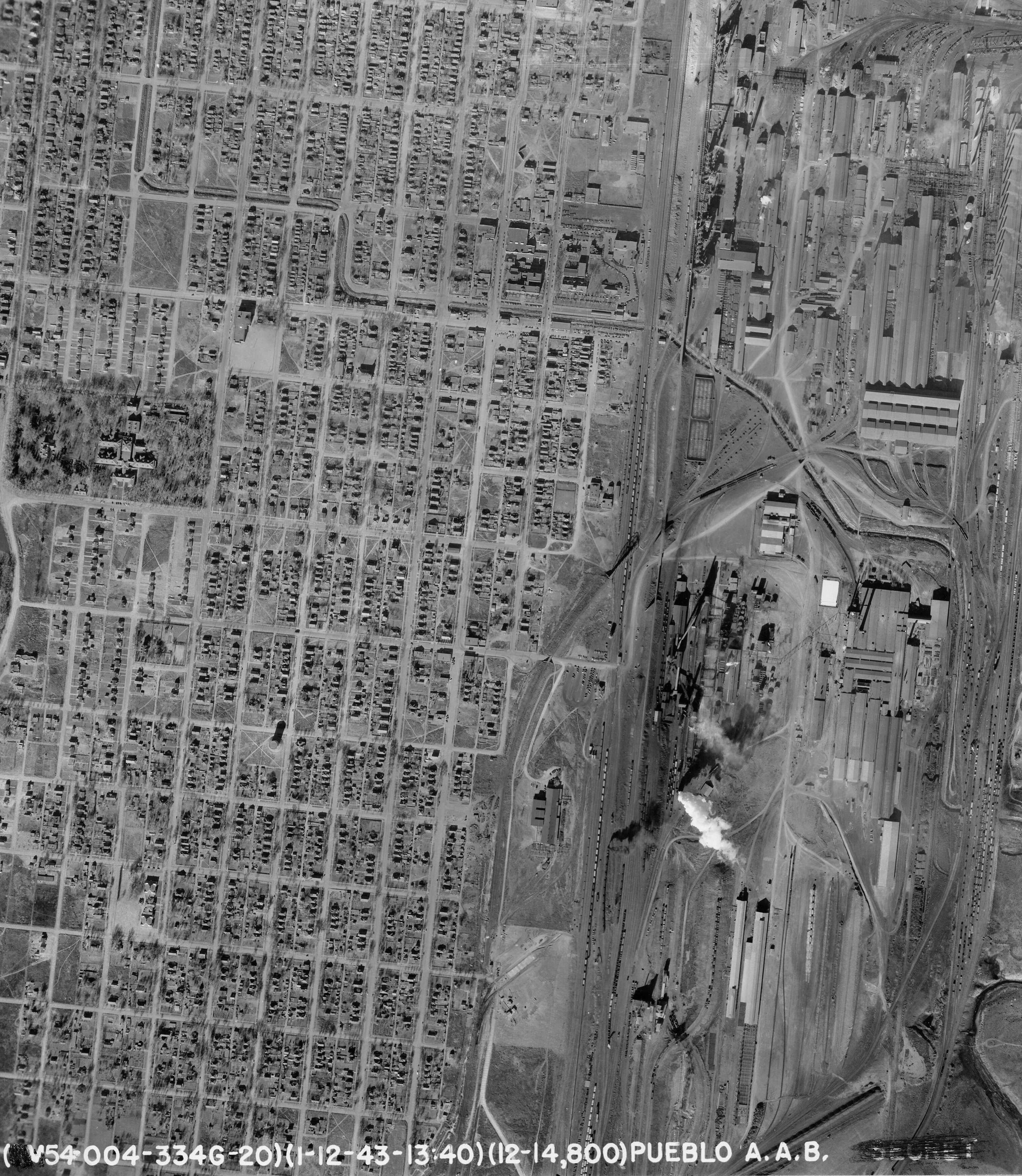
- View of the Pueblo, Colorado mill in 1943
- Type: Private
- Founded: 1892
- Defunct: 2007
- Fate: Acquired by Evraz

The Colorado Fuel and Iron Company (CF&I) was an American steel conglomerate founded by the merger of previous business interests in 1892. By 1903 it was mainly owned and controlled by John D. Rockefeller and Jay Gould's financial heirs. While it came to control many plants throughout the country, its main plant was a steel mill on the south side of Pueblo, Colorado, and was the city's main industry for most of its history. From 1901 to 1912, Colorado Fuel and Iron was one of the Dow Jones Industrials. The steel-market crash of 1982 led to the decline of the company. After going through several bankruptcies, the company was acquired by Oregon Steel Mills in 1993, and changed its name to Rocky Mountain Steel Mills. In January 2007, Rocky Mountain Steel Mills, along with the rest of Oregon Steel's holdings, were acquired by EVRAZ Group, a Russian steel corporation, for $2.3 billion.

Through the process of vertical integration, the company came to own more than just the main steel plant. Over the course of a century, CF&I operated coal mines throughout southern Colorado, as well as iron mines in Wyoming and Utah, limestone quarries, smaller mines for other materials going into the steel making process, and the Colorado and Wyoming Railway. In Redstone, Colorado, hundreds of coking ovens converted coal into coke.

The Mcnally, Cameron, Robinson and Walsen Mines located in the area of Walsenburg, Colorado, were just a few of the mines owned by the Colorado Fuel and Iron Company.

The Colorado Supply company store was also owned and operated by CF&I. They also came to control many furnaces throughout the country, including E. G. Brooke in Birdsboro, Pennsylvania.

== Founding and early history ==
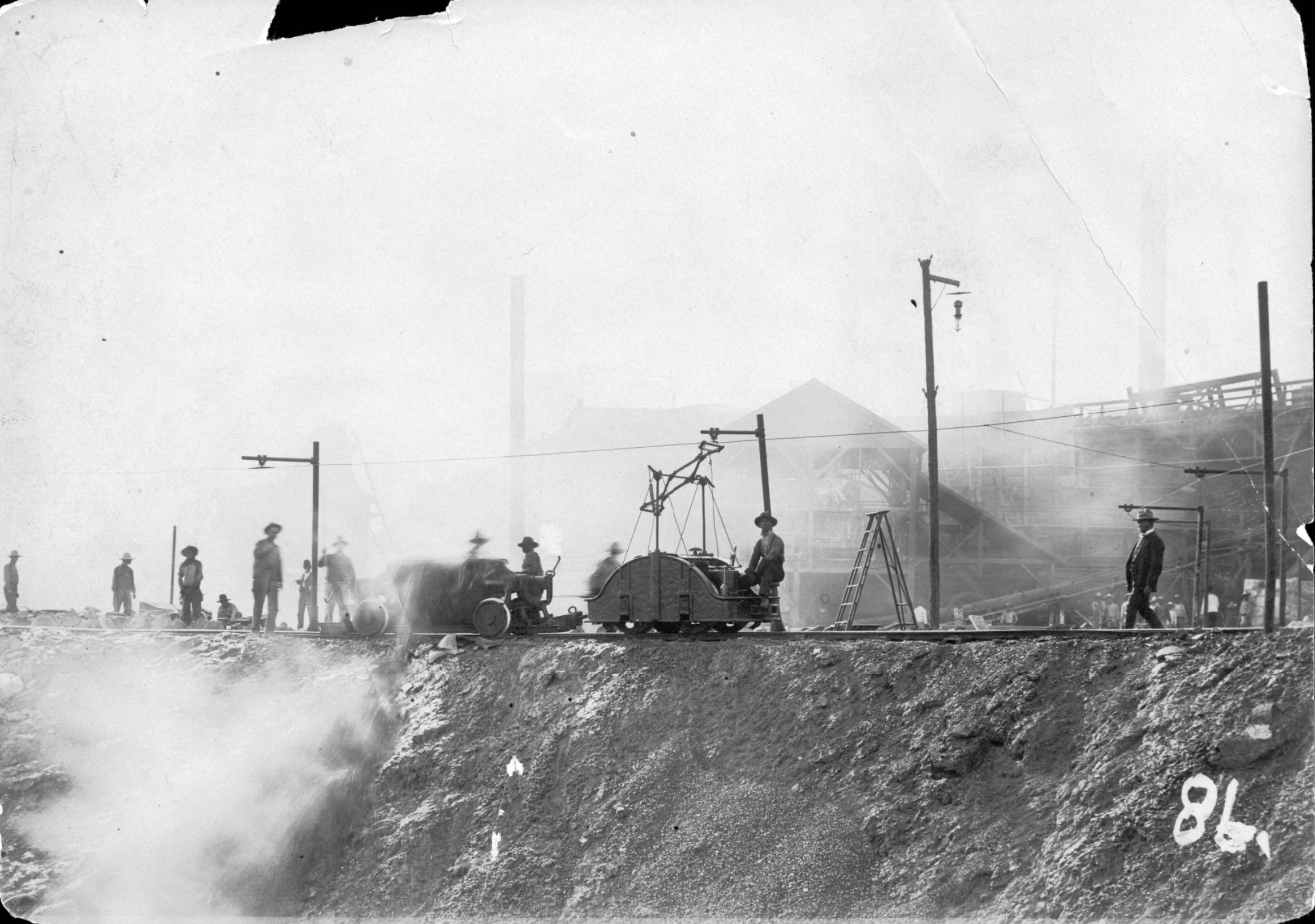
Colorado Fuel & Iron mine at El Moro, c. 1900

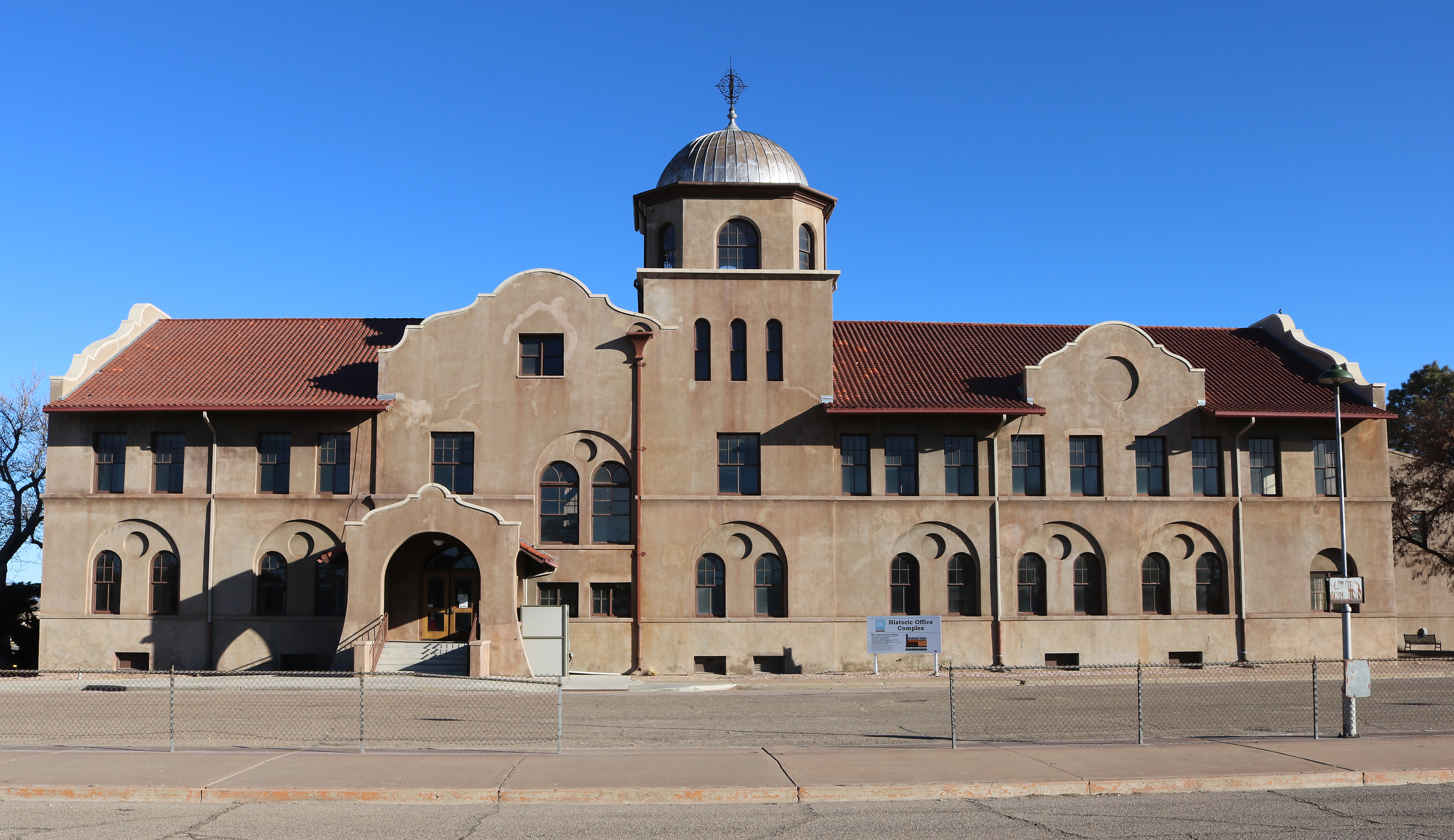
Main office at the Minnequa Steel Works

The first, and only until World War II, integrated iron and steel mill west of St. Louis was built in 1881 in Pueblo on the south side of the Arkansas River by the Colorado Coal and Iron Company (CC&L), an affiliate of the narrow-gauge Denver and Rio Grande Railway Company (D&RG), controlled by General William Jackson Palmer and Dr. William Abraham Bell. Its purpose in part was to manufacture rails for the railway. Local resources included water from the Arkansas River, coal from Trinidad, limestone from a few miles south of Pueblo, and iron ore from the San Luis Valley with rail transportation provided by the D&RG. Manufacturing using blast furnaces and the Bessemer process began April 12, 1881. Products included rails, pig iron, iron and steel bars and plates, and cut nails and spikes.

The original steel works were one of the projects of the Central Colorado Improvement Company, founded by General William J. Palmer in 1872, with plans "to purchase lands, minerals springs, coal and iron and other mines and quarries in Colorado Territory, and the establishment and building up of colonies, towns, coal mining, iron making and manufacturing works, and to build canals and wagon roads." The work on the mill began—under the original name for the steel producer: Colorado Coal and Steel Works—with excavation of the foundation for the first blast furnace in February 1880, on a prairie south of what would later become South Pueblo. A neighborhood of makeshift homes arose near the works, initially called Taylorville, then Steelworks, then, as more permanent dwellings were constructed, Bessemer in 1881. Initial capacity of the mill in 1881–82 was 80 short tons (73 t) per year from the first blast furnace, while a second furnace was being built, and the mill employed 300–400. The first steel rails were produced in April 1882 for the Denver and Rio Grande Railroad's Silverton Branch.

The market for steel was slow due to intense competition from eastern mills, and the mill was often idle. The company turned to production of coke and coal opening additional mines near Trinidad and others near Canon City, Walsenburg, and Crested Butte. Coke ovens were built at El Moro north of Trinidad and at Crested Butte.

In the early 1890s, demand for fuel fell, and the company faced stiff competition from the Colorado Fuel Company, which was closely associated with and provided coal to the Chicago, Burlington and Quincy Railroad (CB&Q). John C. Osgood, who with other investors from Iowa and Colorado, the Iowa Group, had founded Colorado Fuel Company in 1883, which acquired substantial coal reserves in Las Animas and Garfield Counties by purchasing existing facilities. Other properties were acquired in Garfield, Huerfano, Las Animas, and Pitkin counties. On Osgood's initiative these two companies merged in 1892 to form Colorado Fuel and Iron with members of the Iowa Group in control.

Often idle during the decades of the 1880s and 1890s due to stiff competition and the effects of the panic of 1893, the steel mill at Pueblo was small and obsolete. Due to economic conditions it was not possible to modernize it until 1899 when substantial improvements were made. including a rolling mill, additional blast furnaces, a modern Bessemer converter, open hearth furnaces, a wire mill, and supporting facilities. The mill was renamed the Minnequa Works in 1901.

=== Iron ore ===
Early sources of iron ore were hematite from the Calumet Mine north of Salida, Colorado, limonite from the Orient Mine on the west slope of the Sangre de Cristo Range east of Villa Grove and iron and magnesium rich ore which was a byproduct of silver mining at Leadville. Additional iron ore was obtained from New Mexico and Wyoming and reserves purchased in Utah. Company towns were built at isolated facilities such as Orient and Calumet. Deeper ores from Calumet contained greater quantities of silicon, which interfered with the iron making process. Calumet was closed in 1899 and production shifted to the Sunrise Mine near Hartville, Wyoming, about 100 miles north of Cheyenne which the company had leased in 1898. The Colorado and Wyoming Railway Company was organized as subsidiary to transport the ore. Orient was abandoned in 1905 but some ore continued to be mined and sold to the company by contractors until 1922 when it reopened, only to be permanently closed at the beginning of the Great Depression due to falling demand.

Production, which began in 1899 at the Sunrise Mine in Wyoming, was initially by open-pit mining at a cost of 15 cents a ton. By 1900, daily production was 2,000 tons. Purchase of the property was completed in 1904. Shortages of ore continued to plague operations at the refurbished Minnequa Works in Pueblo and some ore was obtained from the 86, Jim Fair, and Union mines near Fierro and Hanover in Grant County, New Mexico. Substantial reserves were purchased near Cedar City in Iron County, Utah, but remained unmined.

=== Limestone ===
Limestone was initially obtained from a quarry a few miles south of Pueblo at Lime near the St. Charles River and later from a high-grade low-phosphorus deposit of limestone and dolomite near Howard.

=== Coal and coke ===
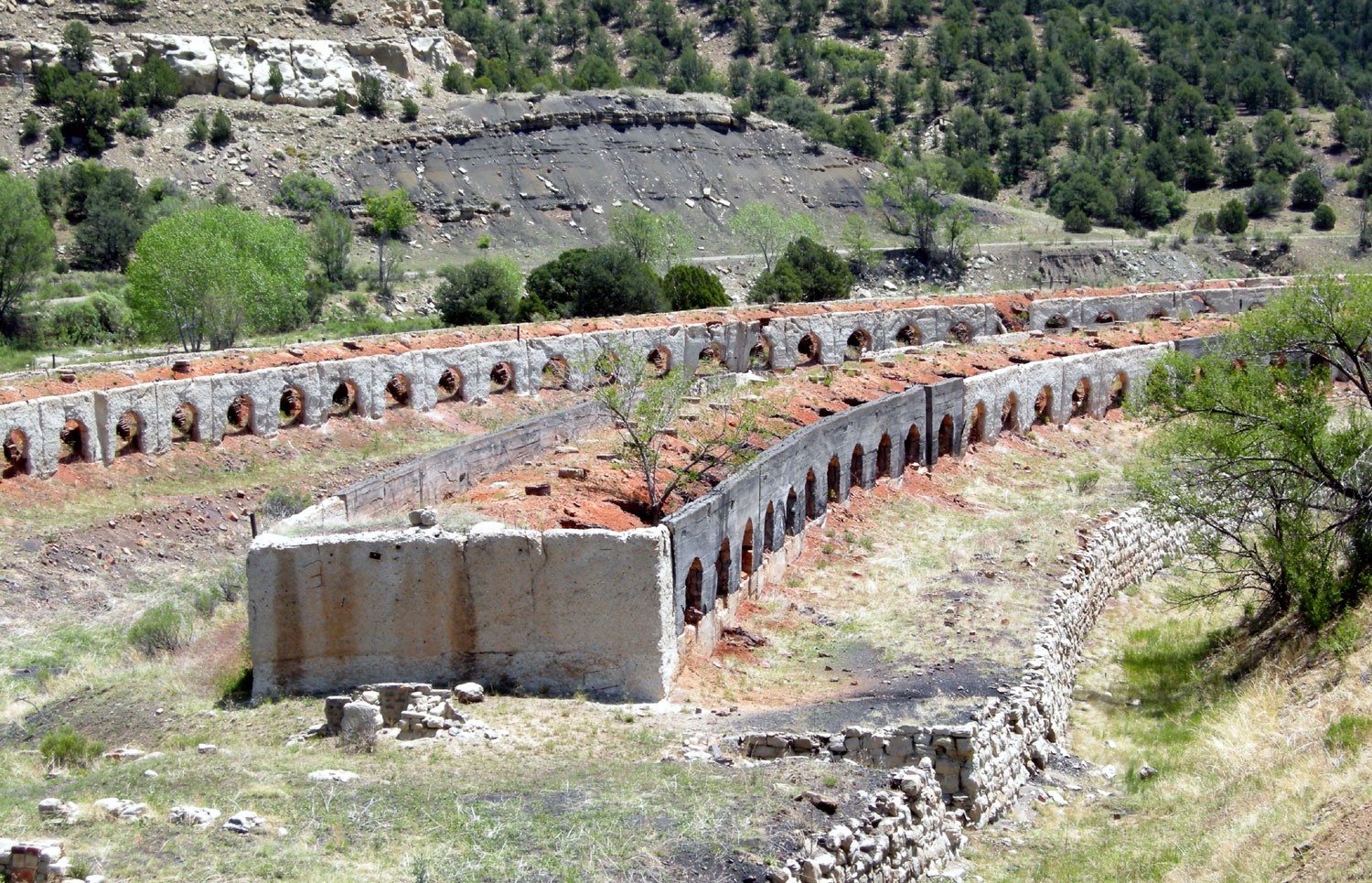
Coal coking ovens at Cokedale, west of Trinidad, Colorado, supplied the steel mills of CF&I.

In 1903, CF&I was the largest producer of coal in the Rocky Mountain west with 23 mines in Las Animas, Huerfano, Fremont, Gunnison, Garfield, and Pitkin County, Colorado, producing 53% of the coal mined in Colorado and its nine coking plants producing 89% of its coke. Steam coal for use in boilers and locomotives was produced in the Huerfano district, coal for home heating in the Canon district, and anthracite at Crested Butte. Demand for coke by the precious metals smelting industry fell off as first silver production was impacted by the panic of 1893 and then gold production fell off in the first decade of the 20th century and used refining techniques which did not require large quantities of coke. The large copper smelting companies operating in the area, Phelps Dodge and The American Smelting and Refining Company, invested in their own coal mines and coking plants in Colfax County, New Mexico and Cokedale, Colorado.

=== Education ===
In 1901, in an effort to deal with its mostly immigrant workforce, CF&I formed the Sociological Department. Their main focus was to better the lives of the workers and their families and to shape their political and economic views. The Sociological Department began educating the miners through night school to teach them English. The Sociological Department began to set standards for education by regulating the curriculum and getting miners' children involved.

Richard Corwin came up with the idea that Kindergarten would be the best way to help the immigrant children become better citizens. Through the Kindergarten program, children were taught English and the importance of industrial labor in hopes of making them good future employees.

Also part of the multi-pronged efforts to promote support for the Company in the latter-half of 1914, several schools were constructed, including one in Primero.

=== Land ===
In 1900, anticipating high demand for coal, the extensive and coal rich lands of the Colorado portion of the Maxwell Land Grant near Trinidad in Las Animas County were purchased through its subsidiary, the Rocky Mountain Coal and Iron Company. Following this purchase mines and coking plants and railway connections were constructed by the Colorado and Wyoming Railway Company in 1901 and 1902 west of Trinidad, and facilities built for workers under the direction of Dr. Richard W. Corwin chief surgeon of CF&I.

== 20th century ==
The facility operated a number of blast furnaces until 1982. The main blast furnace structures were torn down in 1989, but due to asbestos content many of the adjacent stoves and support buildings still remain. The stoves and foundations for some of the furnaces can be easily seen from Interstate 25, which runs parallel to the plant's west boundary.

=== Gould and Rockefeller era ===
In 1902, facing cash flow problems, Osgood turned to George Jay Gould a principal stockholder of the Denver and Rio Grande for a loan. Gould, via Frederick Taylor Gates, Rockefeller's financial adviser, brought John D. Rockefeller, creator of the Standard Oil monopoly, in to help finance the loan. Analysis of the company's operations by John D. Rockefeller Jr. showed a need for substantially more funds which were provided in exchange for acquisition of CF&I's subsidiaries such as the Colorado and Wyoming Railway Company, the Crystal River Railroad Company, and possibly the Rocky Mountain Coal and Iron Company. Control was passed from the Iowa Group to Gould and Rockefeller interests in 1903 with Gould in control and Rockefeller and Gates representing a minority interests. Osgood left the company in 1904 and devoted his efforts to operating competing coal and coke operations.

An experienced manager, Frank J. Hearne, retired president of National Tube Company, one of the predecessors of U.S. Steel was brought in September 1903 to manage the enterprise. In 1904 the assets of the firm and its subsidiaries were consolidated as Colorado Industrial Company whose stock was wholly owned by the shareholders of CF&I, mainly Gould and Rockefeller. This put all properties of the firm under a single management. Gross sales were substantially increased but increasing profit proved elusive due to competition from eastern producers. Income in 1907 was $1.07 million on sales of $23.8 million in 1907.

In November 1903, the United Mine Workers struck the coal mines near Walsenburg and Trinidad. The strike, which lasted 11 months, produced no gains and demoralized the miners, was fought vigorously with strikebreakers and reduced steel production. The company was able to maintain coal inventory for sale to the company's customers, thus preventing state interference due to a shortage of coal.

Following the strike substantial investments were made to the mill including purchase of water rights in the Arkansas River and a reservoir at the site of Sugar Loaf Dam west of Leadville. Previously the mill had relied on the scant and variable flow of the St. Charles River, storing water in Lake Minnequa.

Gates, Rockefeller's financial advisor, had little confidence in Jesse Floyd Welborn who had been elected by Gould and his allies to succeed Hearne as manager in 1907. Welborn had risen within the company from a clerk, knew the operation well, and had the confidence of the company's staff. When Gould suffered severe financial losses due to the Panic of 1907 his need for funds resulted in transfer of his interests to Rockefeller. Gates preferred Lamont M. Bowers, his aunt's husband, with extensive management experience. Welborn was advised to take guidance from Bowers, who was hired as Welborn's subordinate. Welborn had little choice but to defer to Bowers which resulted in Welborn, the president of the company, being only a figurehead and sometimes resulted in him having to make decisions he would not have made on his own motion.

Effectively in charge from 1908 to early 1915, Bowers applied his managerial skills to making the company profitable, reducing employment rolls, closing marginal operations, and reducing improvements and the companies sociological and medical programs. His efforts were successful; profits increased and dividends were paid. The steel mill operated at full capacity and was slightly expanded. Greater profits proved elusive, however, due to eastern competition and limited transportation facilities such as a perennial shortage of railway cars to ship coal.

There was a series of disastrous explosions from 1904 to 1910 at the coal mines near Trinidad which resulted in substantial casualties. Attempts to prevent such disasters resulted in substantial improvements in mine safety techniques by the company and by the coal mining industry generally such as increased mine ventilation, sprinkler systems to keep coal dust wet, and liberal spreading of rockdust to dilute explosive coal dust. Concern over mine safety resulted in creation of the United States Bureau of Mines in 1907 and enactment of improved mine safety regulations in Colorado.

=== Labor ===
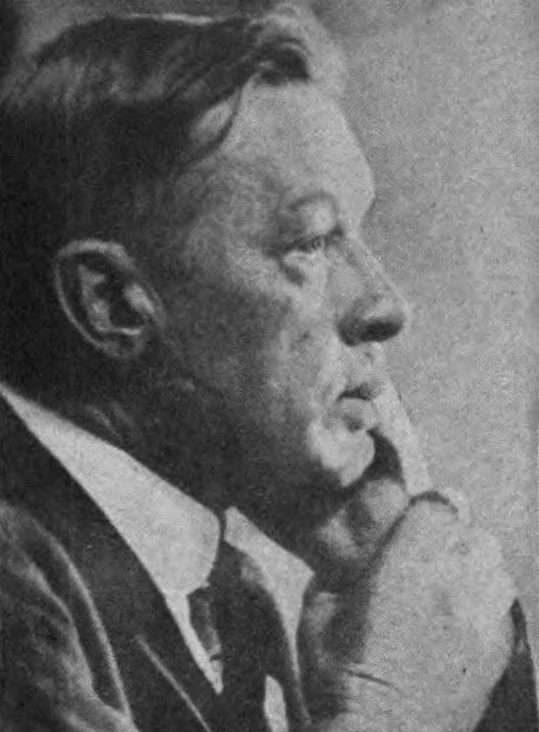
Jesse F. Welborn, president of the Colorado Fuel and Iron Company

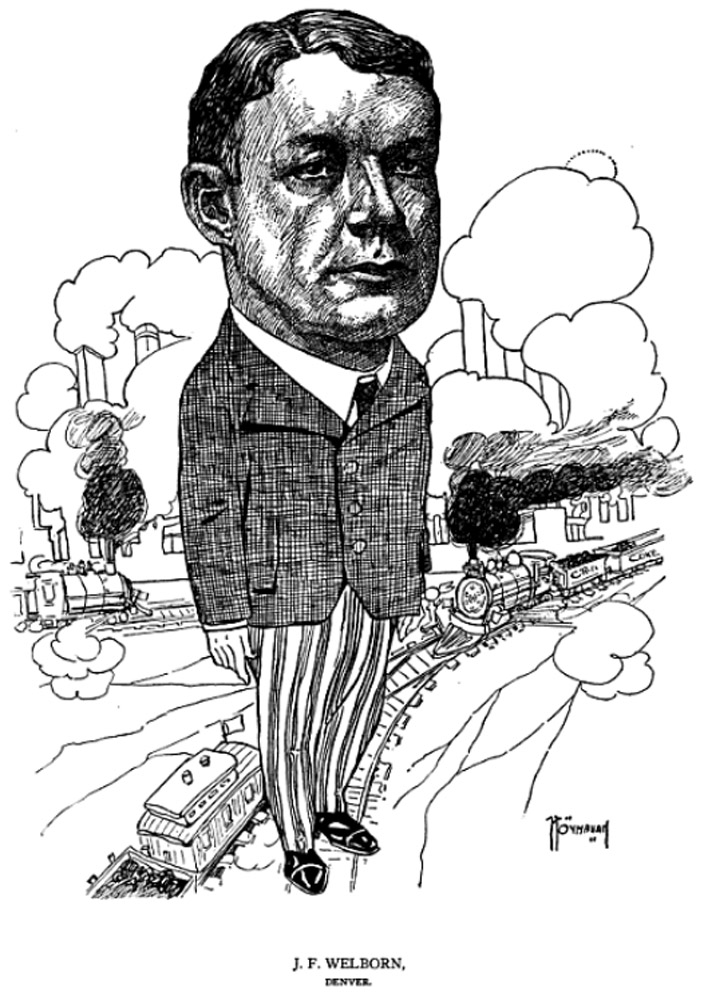
1904 caricature of Jesse F. Welborn executed by B.S. White of American Cartoonist Magazine

CF&I's early labor relations were set in the context of the volatile and violent Colorado Labor Wars. Over the course of its history, the company has had numerous major labor disputes. CF&I was accused of brutality against the UMWA in a strike called by that organization in 1903–04. The best known strike culminated in the infamous Ludlow Massacre at the Ludlow Depot, a stop on the Colorado and Southern Railroad which was near several coal mines, in 1914. Evidence from CF&I's archives reveals that the company infiltrated, propagandized against, and attempted to disrupt the Industrial Workers of the World.

The labor force of CF&I was made up in large part of immigrants, many from eastern and southern Europe. Although experienced miners from Cornwall were encouraged to immigrate and were taken on particularly at the Sunrise Mine, much of the workforce was inexperienced and not fluent in English. This complicated communication of mine and industrial safety information. Due to their lack of sophistication it was possible to influence how the workers voted. Fraudulent voting of this nature was employed extensively by company operatives to accomplish various personal and company goals.

Lamont M. Bowers, effectively the chief executive officer of CF&I, in addition to his paternalistic concern regarding vices such as drinking, gambling, and prostitution which might affect the health of CF&I workers, and also company profits, and his efforts to clean up the mining towns and support enactment of prohibition in Colorado, was strongly anti-union and refused to recognize or negotiate with the United Mine Workers during the period leading up to the major strike of 1913–14. The effects of that prolonged and violent strike ended his career with the firm.

==== Strike of 1913–14 ====
The strike, called in September 1913, by the United Mine Workers over the issue of union representation, was against coal mine operators in Huerfano and Las Animas counties in southern Colorado where the majority of CF&I's coal and coke production was located, and was fought by the coal mine operators association and its steering committee which included Welborn, president of CF&I, who was spokesman for the coal operators. Bowers, Rockefeller's man, remained in the background. Few of the miners actually belonged to the union or participated in the strike call, but the majority honored it. Scabs were threatened and sometimes attacked. Both sides purchased substantial arms and ammunition. Most dangerous on the union side were Greek immigrants who were experienced veterans of the Balkan Wars. On October 26, 1913, Elias M. Ammons, the democratic governor of Colorado, responded to the widespread violence by ordering out the Colorado National Guard.

Striking miners were forced to abandon their homes in company towns and lived in tent cities erected by the union such as the tent city at Ludlow, a railway stop north of Trinidad.

Under the protection of the National Guard, some miners returned to work and some strikebreakers imported from the eastern coalfields joined them as Guard troops protected their movements. In February 1914 a substantial portion of the troops were withdrawn, but a sizable contingent remained at Ludlow. On April 20, 1914, a general fire-fight occurred between strikers and troops. The camp burned, and 15 women and children in the camp were burned to death.

In the aftermath of the battle, bands of miners attacked coal company facilities in the area. Lieutenant Governor of Colorado Stephen R. Fitzgarrald again ordered National Guard troops into the coal fields, but guerrilla warfare by the striking miners continued, and the government troops were beaten back. The governor requested assistance from Woodrow Wilson and units of the United States Army were deployed to the coalfields. There was a substantial increase in coal production in succeeding months.

Attempts at negotiating a settlement in November 1913 had been unsuccessful due to the coal operators refusal to talk to union representatives or to consider recognition of the union. After the violence in the Spring of 1914, United States Secretary of Labor William Bauchop Wilson attempted mediation. Further efforts by state and federal officials and experienced third parties who were brought in were also unsuccessful. Finally, after George Alfred Carlson, a Republican, won the gubernatorial election of 1914, on December 10, 1914, the union called off the strike due to a depletion of strike funds.

Costs to both mine operators and the union were high. Due to reduced demand for coal resulting from an economic downturn many of CF&I's coal mines never reopened and many men were thrown out of work. The union was forced to discontinue strike benefits in February 1915. There was destitution in the coal fields. With the help of funds from the Rockefeller Foundation relief programs were organized by the Colorado Committee on Unemployment and Relief, a state agency created by Governor Carlson, offering work to unemployed miners building roads and doing other useful projects.

The casualties suffered at Ludlow were successfully labeled a massacre and mobilized public opinion against the Rockefellers and the coal industry. The United States Commission on Industrial Relations conducted extensive hearings singling out John D. Rockefeller Jr. and the Rockefellers' relationship with Bowers for special attention. Bower was relieved of duty and Welborn restored to control in 1915 and industrial relations improved.

==== Colorado Industrial Plan ====
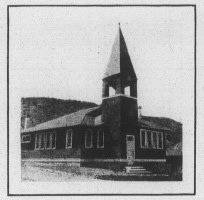
Church built for miners in Sunrise, Wyoming, by CF&I at cost of $3,400

In October 1915 John D. Rockefeller Jr. with the assistance of William Lyon Mackenzie King, director of the Rockefeller Foundation and head of its Department of Industrial Research, introduced the Colorado Industrial Plan, an internal system of worker representation which included guarantees of basic decency in working conditions and in company towns.

Segundo, Colorado, was an example of a company town where CF&I offered adequate housing for its workers and promoted upward mobility through its sponsorship of a YMCA Center, elementary school, and some small businesses, as well as a company store. However air pollution was a constant health threat and the houses lacked indoor plumbing. As demand for metallurgical coke declined, the mine laid off workers and Segundo's population declined. After a major fire in 1929, CF&I left and Segundo became practically a ghost town.

==== 1927–1928 Colorado Coal Strike ====
The CF&I held pervasive spying on workers in the years following up to and during the General Colorado coal strike of 1927, which remains one of the few historically persevered record of company spying on labor organizing, given the secretive nature and risk of bad publicity it brings.

==== Bankruptcy 1990 ====
On November 7, 1990, CF&I filed for protection under Chapter 11.

==== Strike of 1997–2004 ====
In 1997, the steelworkers union in Pueblo voted to strike over alleged unfair labor practices. The old CF&I facility, under new ownership, hired permanent replacement workers, leading to further tension between the new employer and the union.

However, in September 2004, local unions 2102 and 3267 won both the strike and the unfair labor practice charges. All of the striking steel workers were returned to their jobs, and the company was forced to repay a record amount of back pay to all of the striking steel workers for the seven years of the strike.

== Modern production ==
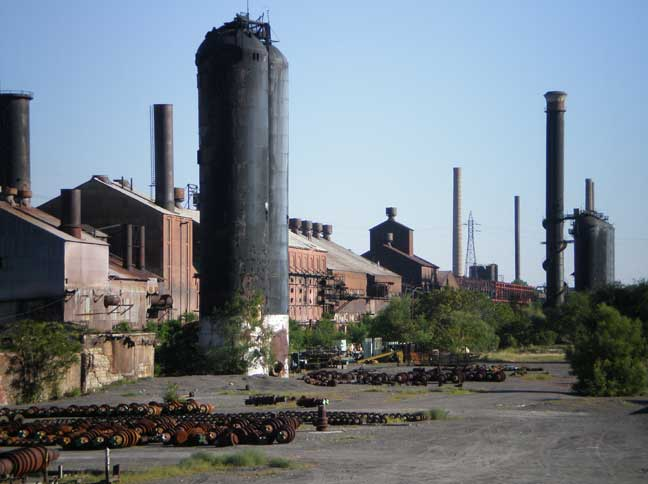
The foundation and stoves of "A"-Furnace in 2010

In addition to the blast furnace/open hearth steelmaking process, CF&I also used the basic oxygen furnace (BOF) process for a number of years. This process was later replaced by electric arc furnaces (EAF). Currently, one EAF is used at the facility to convert over a million tons of scrap per year into steel billets of various sizes. The billets are then distributed to the three steel finishing facilities (rail mill, rod & bar mill, seamless tube mill) for processing into the various finished products.

Several of the administration buildings, including the main office building, dispensary, and tunnel gatehouse have been purchased by the Steelworks Center of the West to house their Steelworks Museum and the Steelworks Archives.

Out of the many production and fabrication mills which once existed on the site, only the steel production (electric furnaces, used for scrap recycling), rail, rod & bar, and seamless tube mills are still in operation. The wire mill was sold in the late 1990s to Davis Wire, which produced products such as fence and nails under the CF&I brand name until 2014 when it was closed. The mill was able to produce rail lengths of up to 480 feet (up from the current 80 feet), lengths currently possible only in a few European plants.

== See also ==
- Steelworks Museum
