= Colorado Coal and Iron Company =

Colorado Coal and Iron Company was formed in 1880 when three Denver and Rio Grande subsidiaries controlled by William J. Palmer merged. These were the Colorado Coal and Steel Works Company, the Central Colorado Improvement Company, and the Southern Colorado Coal and Town Company. In 1888, Edward J. Berwind was president. In 1890 the company appointed Henry S. Grove to serve as president. Grove, a recognized "Captain of Industry" would eventually merge the company with the Colorado Fuel Company to form the Colorado Fuel & Iron Company, which for many years was Colorado's largest employer and dominated industry around the state for decades.

== See also ==
Steelworks Museum of Industry and Culture
