= History of Colorado =

History of the U.S. State of Colorado

Coordinates: 38.9972°N 105.5478°W

The location of the State of Colorado in the United States of America.

The region that is today the U.S. State of Colorado has been inhabited by Native Americans and their Paleo-American ancestors for at least 13,500 years, and possibly more than 37,000 years. The eastern edge of the Rocky Mountains was a major migration route that was important to the spread of early peoples throughout the Americas. The Lindenmeier site in Larimer County contains artifacts dating from approximately 8720 BCE.

When explorers, early trappers, hunters, and gold miners visited and settled in Colorado, the state was populated by American Indian nations. Westward expansion brought European settlers to the area and Colorado's recorded history began with treaties and wars with Mexico and American Indian nations to gain territorial lands to support the transcontinental migration. In the early days of the Colorado gold rush, Colorado was a Territory of Kansas and Territory of Jefferson. On August 1, 1876, Colorado was admitted as a state, maintaining its territorial borders.

== European exploration ==
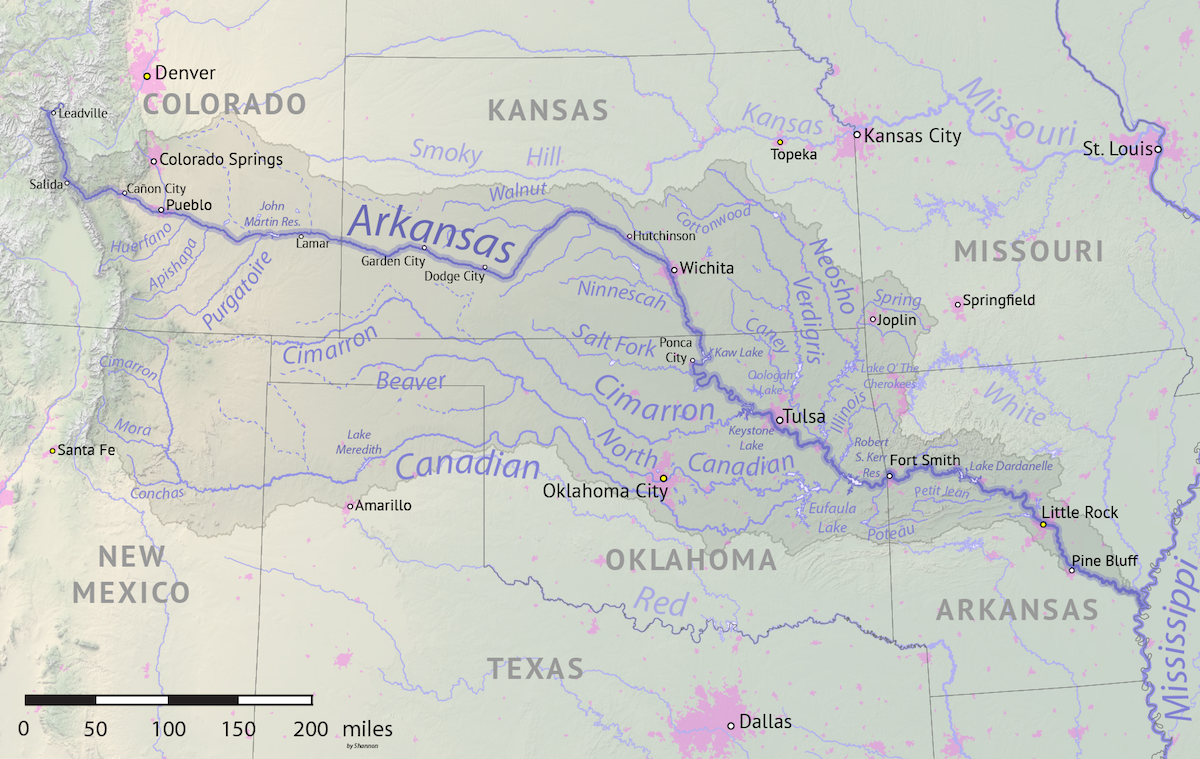
Arkansas River basin map

In 1787 Juan Bautista de Anza established the settlement of San Carlos near present-day Pueblo, Colorado, but it quickly failed. This was the only Spanish attempt to create a settlement north of the Arkansas River. Colorado became part of the Spanish province of Santa Fe de Nuevo México as part of the Viceroyalty of New Spain. The Spaniards traded with Native Americans who lived there and established the Comercio Comanchero (Comanche Trade) among the Spanish settlements and the Native Americans.

The Pike Expedition (July 15, 1806 – July 1, 1807) was a military party sent out by President Thomas Jefferson and authorized by the United States government to explore the south and west of the recent Louisiana Purchase. It was led by United States Army Lieutenant Zebulon Pike, Jr. who was promoted to captain during the trip. It was the first official American effort to explore the western Great Plains and the Rocky Mountains in present-day Colorado. Pike contacted several Native American tribes during his travels and informed them that the U.S. now claimed their territory. The expedition documented the United States' discovery of Tava which was later renamed Pikes Peak in honor of Pike.

In 1819, the United States ceded its claim to the land south and west of the Arkansas River to Spain with the Adams-Onís Treaty, at the same time purchasing Florida. Mexico won its independence with the Treaty of Córdoba signed on August 24, 1821, and assumed the territorial claims of Spain.

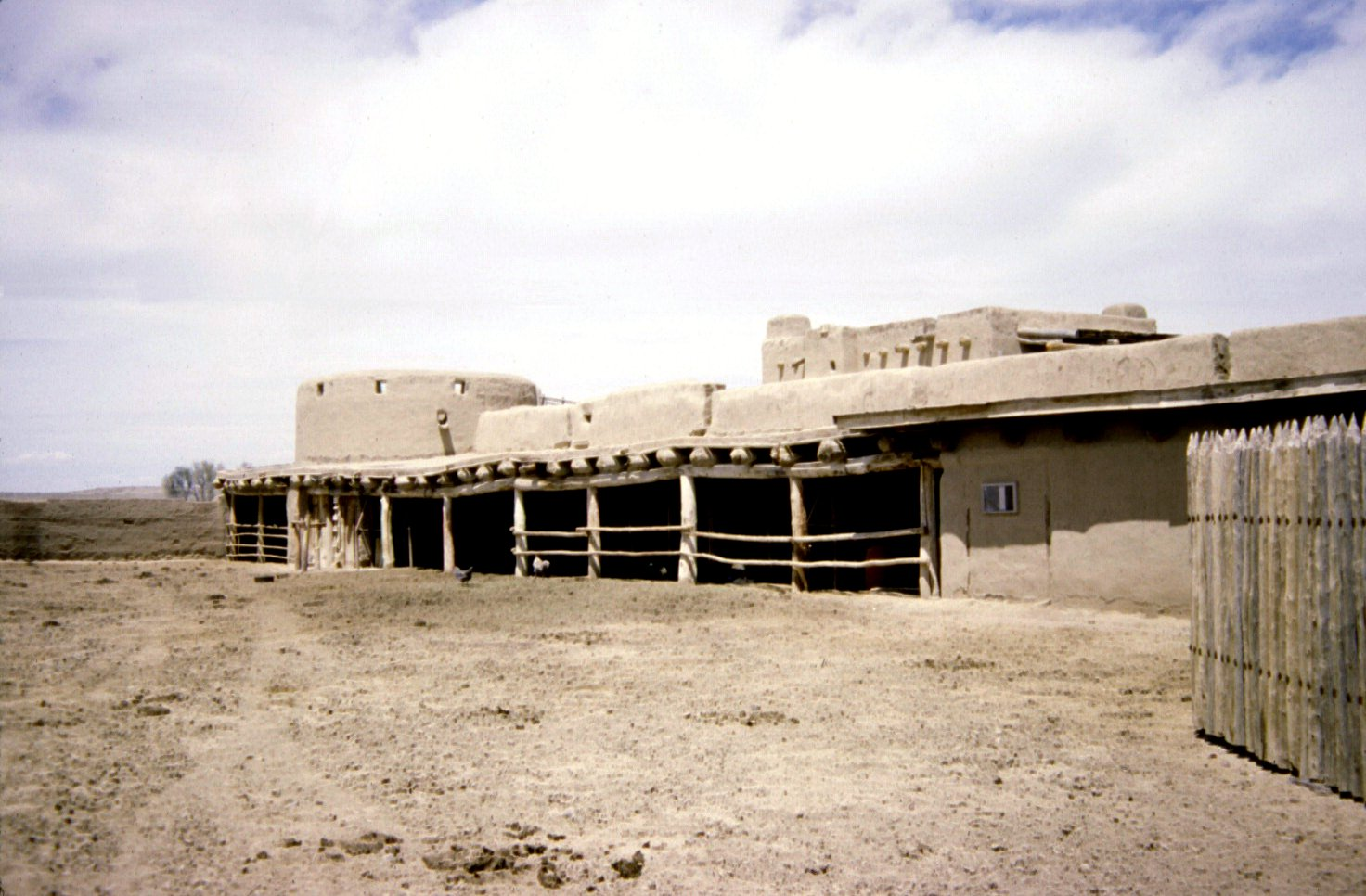
Trading posts such as Bent's Old Fort served fur traders in the early 19th century.

During the early history of the Arkansas Valley in Colorado from 1832 to 1856, traders, trappers, and settlers established trading posts and small settlements along the Arkansas River, and on the South Platte near the Front Range. Prominent among these were Bent's Fort and Fort Pueblo on the Arkansas and Fort Saint Vrain on the South Platte. The trade was mainly native Cheyenne and Arapaho who sold buffalo and other furs for refined goods such as alcohol from the United States. Nearly all the construction was done by Mexicans who traveled to the valley for work. The Arkansas river was not navigable so wagon trails were used to transport goods to and from Missouri and Kansas. The Arapaho continued to occupy and influence the area on the Front Range near the Platte River. The Ute retained territorial control over the rest of what is now Colorado.

South of the Arkansas Valley, the Mexican government had planned to settle the land via a land grant system in which a small number of individuals where granted ownership of millions of acres of land with the expectation that they would lead settlement. However these settlements were largely unsuccessful because the Utes continued to control the land until 1851.

In 1846 the United States went to war with Mexico. Mexico's defeat forced the nation to relinquish its northern territories by the Treaty of Guadalupe Hidalgo in 1848. This opened the Southern Rocky Mountains to American settlement, including what is now the lower portion of Colorado. The newly gained land was divided into the Territory of New Mexico and the Territory of Utah, both organized in 1850, and the Territory of Kansas and the Territory of Nebraska, organized in 1854.

On April 9, 1851, Hispanic settlers from Taos, New Mexico, settled the village of San Luis de la Culebra, then in the New Mexico Territory, but now Colorado's first permanent European settlement.

The 1851 Treaty of Fort Laramie formed a basis for relations with the local Arapaho and Cheyenne tribes. However the immigrants did not respect the terms of treaty, treated natives unjustly, and directly provoked native people which lead to tensions.

== Gold Rush ==
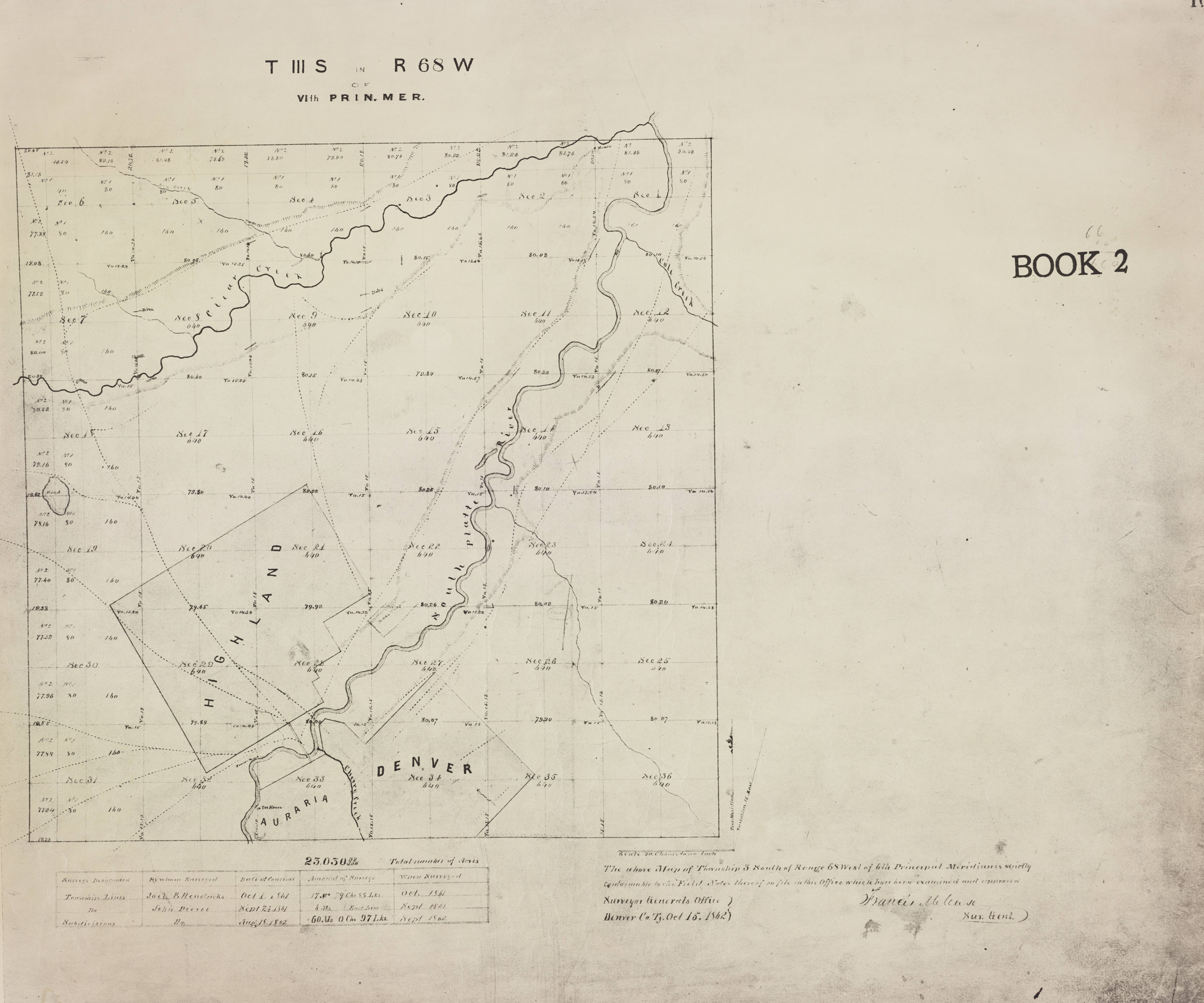
Early map of Auraria and Denver showing Clear Creek and Platte River

From 1850-1853, several parties of gold seekers panned various streams in the South Platte River Valley, but their activity produced more rumors than gold. These groups found Little Raven's Arapahoe band, which occupied the area, to be welcoming. In the summer of 1857, a party of Mexican gold seekers worked a placer deposit along the South Platte River about 5 miles (8 km) above Cherry Creek. By 1858 several parties of gold seekers had founded several camps which eventually conglomerated into Denver. News of these parties began the Pike's Peak Gold Rush.

The Pike's Peak gold rush (later known as the Colorado gold rush) was the boom in gold prospecting and mining in the Pike's Peak Country of western Kansas Territory and southwestern Nebraska Territory of the United States that began in July 1858 and lasted until roughly the creation of the Colorado Territory on February 28, 1861. An estimated 100,000 gold seekers took part. The dramatic but temporary influx of migrants and immigrants came to the Southern Rocky Mountains. The prospectors provided the first major White American population in the region.

== Jefferson Territory ==
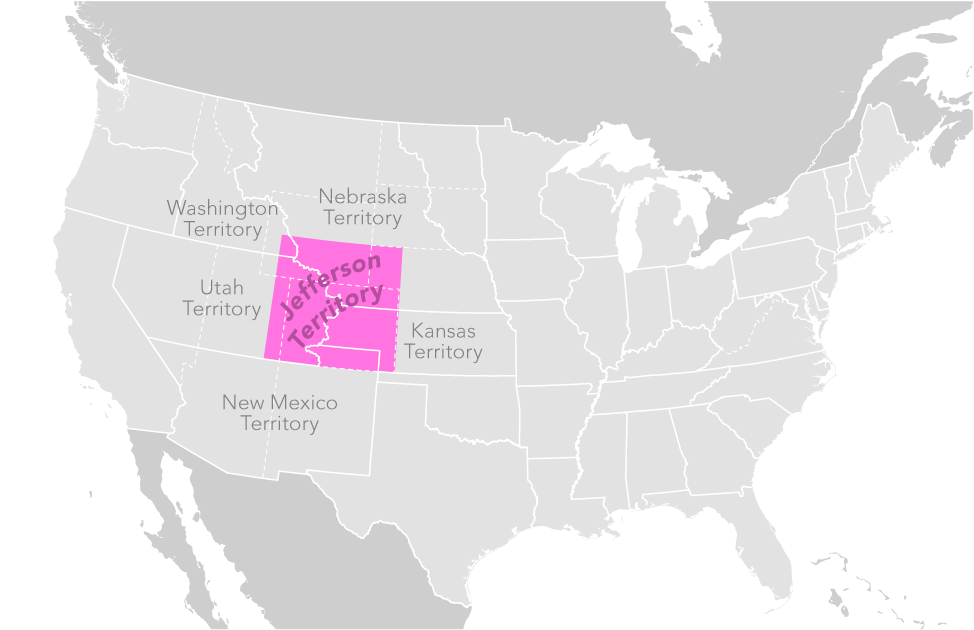
Location of the extralegal Territory of Jefferson in the United States of America of 1861

The Provisional Government of the Territory of Jefferson was an extralegal and unrecognized United States territory that existed in the Pike's Peak mining region from October 24, 1859, until it yielded to the new Territory of Colorado on June 6, 1861. The Jefferson Territory included all of the present State of Colorado and portions of the present states of Kansas, Nebraska, Utah, and Wyoming. The people were desirous of a closer government than those five territories provided.

The government of the Jefferson Territory, while democratically elected, was never legally recognized by the United States government, although it managed the territory with relatively free rein for 19 months. Many of the laws enacted by the General Assembly of the Territory of Jefferson were reenacted and given official sanction by the new Colorado General Assembly in 1861.

Golden City was established on June 16, 1859, along Clear Creek west of Denver. Its geographic location made it a center of trade between the gold fields to the west and settlements to the east. By the end of 1860, Golden was capital of Jefferson Territory.

== Territory of Colorado ==
The Territory of Colorado was an organized incorporated territory of the United States that existed from February 28, 1861, until August 1, 1876, when it was admitted to the Union as the 38th State of Colorado. The territory was created during the onset of the American Civil War in the wake of the Pike's Peak Gold Rush, which brought the first large concentration of settlers from the east to the region. The war stifled growth, but following the war mining grew more industrialized and fueled the economy. The construction of railroads further improved the economy. The boundaries of the newly designated Colorado Territory were very similar to those of the modern State of Colorado.

Statehood was regarded as fairly imminent, as during the run-up to the 1864 presidential election the Republican–controlled Congress was actually eager to get two more Republican senators and three more electoral votes for President Lincoln's re-election bid. Territorial Governor John Evans persuaded Congress to adopt an enabling act, but a majority of the 6,192 Coloradoans who voted, in a population of around 35,000, turned down the first attempt at a state constitution and the second attempt at statehood. Later, at the end of 1865, territorial ambitions for statehood were thwarted again, this time by a veto by President Andrew Johnson. Statehood for the territory was a recurring issue during the Ulysses Grant administration, with Grant advocating statehood against a less willing Congress during Reconstruction.

== Colorado War ==
The Colorado War (1863–1865) was an armed conflict between the United States and a loose alliance among the Kiowa, Comanche, Arapaho, and Cheyenne nations of Native Americans (the last two were particularly closely allied, which is unusual since the various tribes were notorious for inciting violence against each other). The war was centered on the Eastern Plains of the Colorado Territory and resulted in the removal of these four Native American peoples from present-day Colorado to present-day Oklahoma. The war included a particularly notorious episode in November 1864 known as the Sand Creek Massacre. The battle, initially hailed by the U.S. press as a great victory, was later learned to be one of genocidal brutality. The resulting hearings in the United States Congress regarding the malfeasance of the U.S. Army commander, John Chivington, were a watershed in the white views of the Indian Wars at the close of the American Civil War. In 1868 the U.S. Army, led by George Armstrong Custer, renewed the conflict against the Arapaho and Cheyenne at the Battle of Washita River.

== Early statehood 1876-1900 ==
The United States Congress passed an enabling act on March 3, 1875, specifying the requirements for the Territory of Colorado to become a state. On August 1, 1876 (28 days after the Centennial of the United States), President Ulysses S. Grant signed Proclamation 230 admitting the state of Colorado to the Union as the 38th state and earning it the moniker "Centennial State". The borders of the new state coincided with the borders established for the Colorado Territory.

Women won the right to vote in Colorado via referendum on November 7, 1893. Colorado was the first state in the union to grant universal suffrage through a popular vote. (The territory of Wyoming approved the right of women to vote in 1869 through a vote of the territorial legislature.) Governor Davis H. Waite, a left-wing Populist, campaigned for the amendment but he a year later he blamed the women voters for defeating his reelection campaign. Waite favored labor unions and is one of the few American state governors ever to call out the state militia to protect miners from a force raised by mine owners in the Cripple Creek miners' strike of 1894.

== Mining in Colorado ==
Colorado Mineral Belt

Participants in the Pike's Peak Gold Rush from 1858 to 1861 were called Fifty-Niners and many of the new arrivals settled in the Denver area. Gold in paying quantities was also discovered in the Central City area. In 1879, silver was discovered in Leadville, resulting in the Colorado Silver Boom.

Many early mining efforts were cooperative ventures. However, as easy-to-reach surface deposits played out, miners increasingly turned to hard rock mining. Such industrial operations required greater capital, and the economic concept of mineral rights resulted in periodic conflicts between the mine owners, and the miners who increasingly sold their labor to work in the mines.

As the mines were dug deeper, they became more dangerous, and the work more arduous, creating the conditions for conflict. In 1880, Colorado Governor Pitkin, a Republican, declared martial law to suppress a violent mining strike at Leadville. In the 1890s many Colorado miners began to form unions in order to protect themselves. The mine operators often formed mine owners' associations in response, setting up the conditions for a conflict. Notable labor disputes between hard rock miners and the mine operators included the Cripple Creek strike of 1894 and the Colorado Labor Wars of 1903–04.

Coal mining in Colorado began soon after the first settlers arrived. Although the discovery of coal did not cause boom cycles as did the precious metals, the early coal mining industry also established the conditions for violent confrontations between miners and mine owners. The usual issues were wages, hours, and working conditions, but miners were also concerned about issues of fairness, and company control over their personal lives.

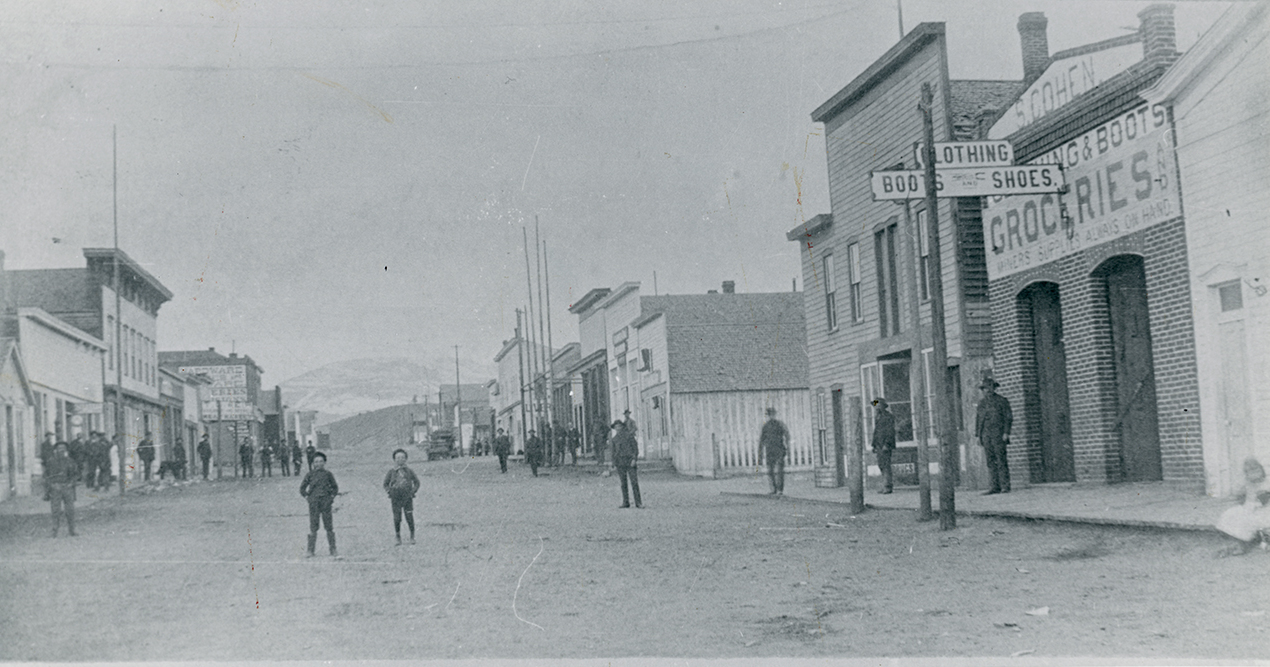
Fairplay, Colorado Front Street in 1888.

Early coal mining in Colorado was extremely dangerous, and the state had one of the highest death rates in the nation. During the three decades from 1884 to 1914, more than 1,700 workers died in Colorado's coal mines. Coal miners also resented having to pay for safety work such as timbering the mines, and they were sometimes paid in scrip that had value only in the company store, with the cost of goods set by the company.

The Colorado Coalfield War, centered around the 1913-1914 United Mine Workers of America strike against the Rockefeller-owned Colorado Fuel and Iron company, saw dozens die in battles on the Southern Colorado coalfields. The Ludlow Massacre became the peak of the violence, when Colorado National Guard and militia fired into a tent colony of strikers, in which many children were killed. The violence would continue until Woodrow Wilson sent federal soldiers to disarm both sides.

Another coal strike in 1927 is best known for Colorado's first Columbine massacre. In 1933, federal legislation for the first time allowed all Colorado coal miners to join unions without fear of retaliation by instituting penalties for mine owners who obstructed collective bargaining.

Like all resource extraction, mining is a boom or bust industry, and over the years many small towns were established, then abandoned when the ore ran out, the market collapsed, or another resource became available. There were once more than a hundred coal mines in the area north of Denver and east of Boulder. The mines began to close when natural gas lines arrived. Coal and precious metals are still mined in Colorado, but the mining industries have changed dramatically in recent decades.

Reports of the revival of molybdenum mining in 2007 resulted in ambivalent responses with Leadville welcoming the opening of the mine at Climax, but strong opposition in Crested Butte over proposed operations at Mount Emmons. Opinion in Rico, site of the Silver Creek stockwork Molybdenum deposit is more divided. There, land slated for development is being bought up by a mining company.

Today there are many small mining towns scattered throughout Colorado, such as Leadville, Georgetown, Cripple Creek, Victor, and Central City. Although many of the mines no longer operate, the remnants of the operations can be seen in the form of mine shafts, outbuildings, and mounds of rock extracted from the hills. Many former mining towns turned to gambling to draw visitors, with Blackhawk and Cripple Creek serving as good examples. The 19th century ended with a difficult law-and-order situation in some places, most notably, Creede, Colorado, where gunmen like Robert Ford (the assassin of Jesse James) and con artist like Soapy Smith reigned.

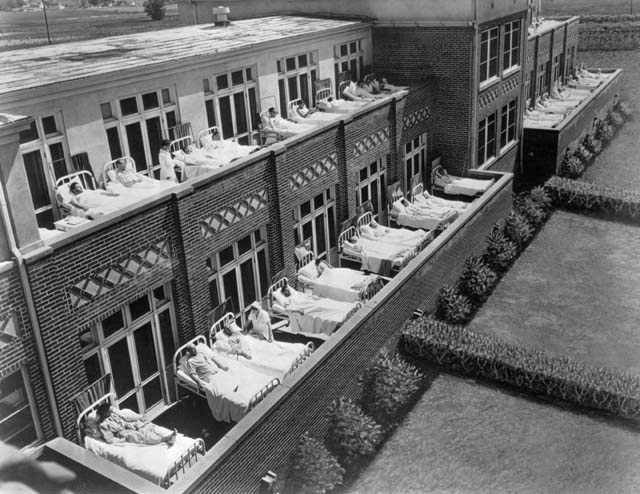
Tuberculosis patients lie in beds on the porch of a building at the Jewish Consumptive Relief Society (J.C.R.S.) sanatorium

== "The World's Sanitarium" ==
Starting in the 1860s, when tuberculosis (TB) was a major deadly disease, physicians in the eastern United States recommended that their patients relocate to sunny, dry climates for their lungs. As a result, the number of people with tuberculosis, called "lungers", in the state grew alarmingly and without the services or facilities to support their needs. Not knowing how to manage a population of homeless, ill people, many were taken to jail. Because of the number of people with TB and their families who came to Denver for their health, by the 1880s it was nicknamed the "World's Sanitarium". Cynthia Stout, a history scholar, asserted that by 1900 "one-third of Colorado's population were residents of the state because of tuberculosis."

== Twentieth century ==
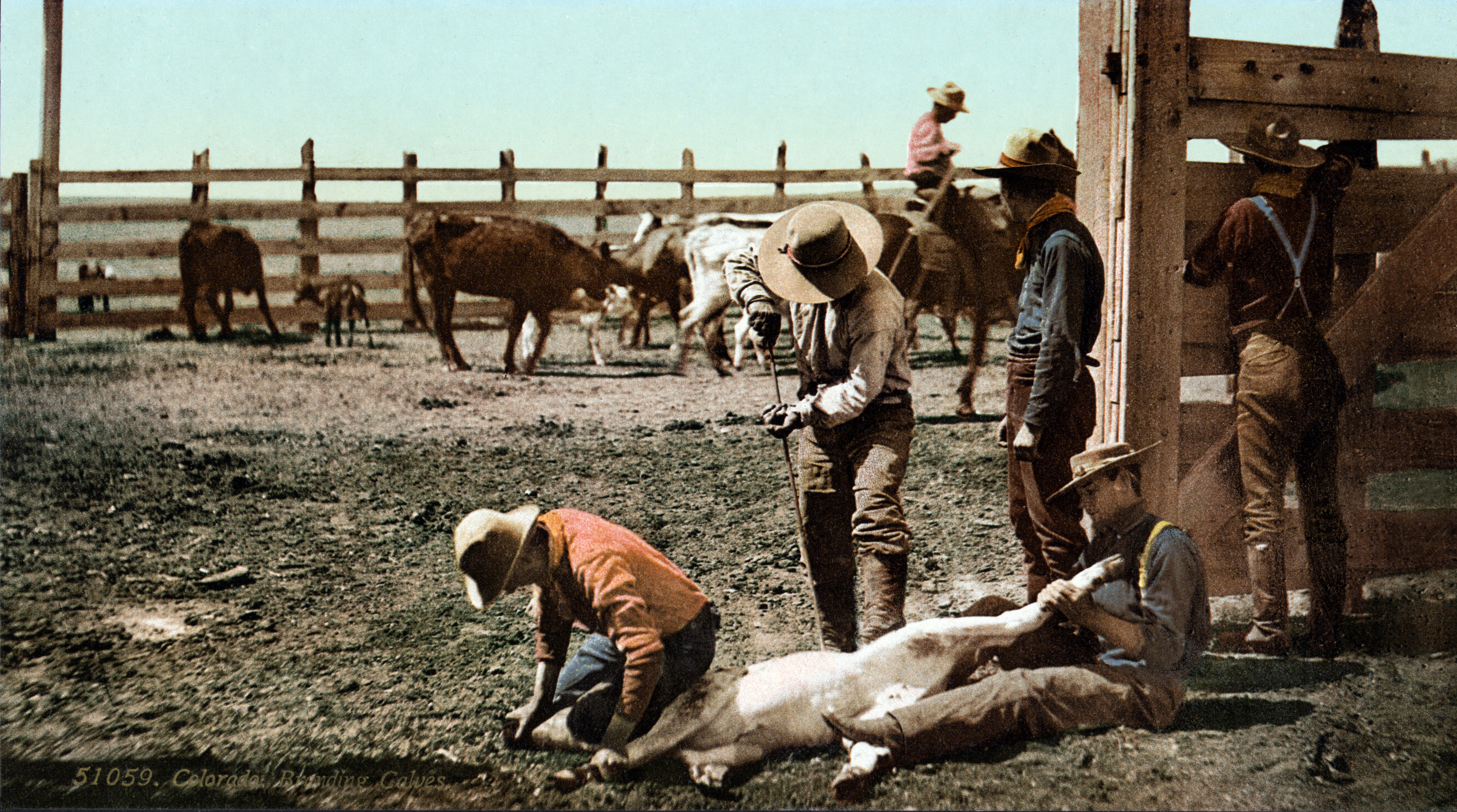
Branding cattle on a Colorado ranch, c. 1900

In 1913 through 1914 the Colorado Coalfield War occurred. It started as a strike and ultimately ended in defeat for the union ending with 232 deaths, and crippling labor organizing in the state's mines for the next decade.

In the early 1920s, the Ku Klux Klan suddenly built a large membership hostile to Catholics. Its leaders tried to gain political influence but they were unable to get any proposals enacted into law. The members quit and the KKK died out by the late 1920s.

From 1927 to 1928, a statewide coal strike occurred shutting down all mines. It was sponsored by a upstart rival of the main miners' union and demanded better wages and conditions. During it, the Columbine Mine massacre and Walsenburg Hall killings occurred, where strikers were shot down by guards and policemen. For one particular incident in Trinidad, the mayor was accused of deputizing members of the KKK against the striking workers. The strike ended with a significant victory for the union in May 1928, with an increase in wages and the return of organized labor in the state's coal industry.

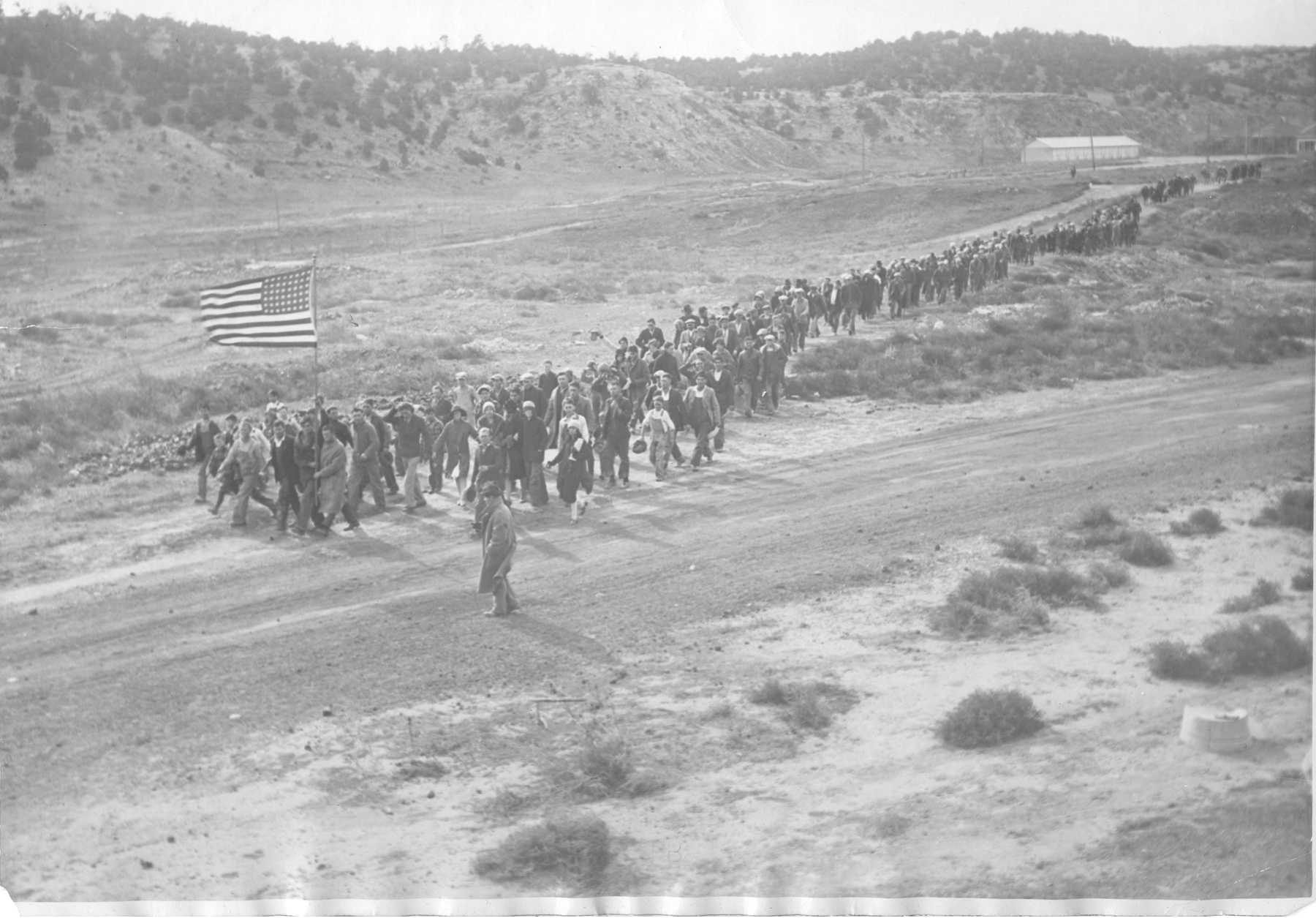
Striking workers & family marching during the Colorado coal strike on November 3, 1927

The 1930s saw the beginning of the ski industry in Colorado. Resorts were established in areas such as Estes Park, Gunnison, and on Loveland Pass. During WWII, the 10th Mountain Division established Camp Hale to train elite ski troops.

In the 1940s, the Republican governor of Colorado, Ralph Carr, spoke out against racial discrimination and against the federal internment of Japanese-Americans during World War II.

In 1967, Governor John A. Love signed the nation's first liberalized abortion law. The late 1960s saw violence in Denver, in the form of race riots, and college buildings being burned by radicals. The Family Dog Denver music venue opened that year, ushering in the hippie movement in the state, to the great consternation of city and state leaders and parents, leading to several municipal and federal court cases. It also made Colorado a major music destination thereafter.

In the 1960s and 1970s, Colorado was an epicenter for the Chicano Movement. Colorado has a significant population of Mexican-American, Hispanic and Chicano people. Major events that affected the Chicano Movement happened in Colorado, such as Corky Gonzales' Crusade for Justice and The Plan Espiritual de Aztlán, the deaths of Los Seis de Boulder, and the death of Ricardo Falcón. Leaders of the movement worked with national figures like Cesar Chavez and the lettuce workers strike, and Coloradans held their own actions like the Kitayama Carnation Strike.

In 1972, Colorado became the only state to reject the award of hosting the Olympic Games after they had been granted. When Representative Lamm led a successful movement to reject a bond issue for expenses related to hosting the event, the International Olympic Committee relocated the 1976 Winter Olympics to Innsbruck, Austria. No venue had rejected the award before nor has any venue since.

In 1999, the Columbine High School massacre became the most devastating high-school massacre in United States history until the Marjory Stoneman Douglas High School shooting in 2018.

== Twenty-first century ==
On July 20, 2012, not far from the location of the aforementioned massacre at Columbine High School, 12 people were killed and 70 people were injured in the 2012 Aurora theater shooting, when James Eagan Holmes, a former neuroscience doctoral student, walked into an Aurora Cinemark movie theater with multiple firearms, and started shooting at random at people trying to escape during a midnight Thursday showing of The Dark Knight Rises, killing 12 people and injuring 70 others. It was the deadliest shooting in Colorado since the Columbine High School massacre and, in terms of both the dead and wounded in the number of casualties, was the largest single mass shooting in U.S. history.

Colorado is now 1 of 15 states that have legalized both medical and recreational marijuana, allowing them to tax the product. As of July 2014, six months after recreational shops began sales of marijuana in Colorado, the state has enjoyed a tax revenue of 45 million with 98 million expected by the end of the calendar year. This is in addition to increased economic revenues from "pot tourists."

As of July 9, 2020, the COVID-19 pandemic has affected over 35,000 people in Colorado and killed 1,544.

As of August 2022, over 1.6 million cases of COVID-19 had been reported in Colorado with over 13,000 deaths.

== See also ==
History

- Colorado Silver Boom
- Colorado 1870-2000
- Cuerno Verde
- Forts in Colorado
- Governor of Colorado
- History Colorado (previously the Colorado Historical Society)
- History of Denver, Colorado
- History of the Colorado Plateau
- History of the Great Plains
- History of the Rocky Mountains
- Indigenous peoples of the North American Southwest
- List of cities and towns in Colorado
- List of counties in Colorado
- List of ghost towns in Colorado
- List of historical societies in Colorado
- List of territorial claims and designations in Colorado
- Pike's Peak Gold Rush
- Prehistory of Colorado
- Women's suffrage in Colorado
  - Outline of Colorado prehistory
  - Southwestern archaeology
  - Santa Fe de Nuevo México
  - La Louisiane
  - La Luisiana
  - District of Louisiana
  - Territory of Louisiana
  - Territory of Missouri
  - State of Deseret
  - Territory of New Mexico
  - Territory of Utah
  - Territory of Kansas
  - Territory of Nebraska
  - Territory of Jefferson
  - Territory of Colorado
  - State of Colorado
- Timeline of Colorado history
- Category:History of Colorado
  - commons:Category:History of Colorado

Colorado

- Colorado counties
- Colorado municipalities
- Colorado's congressional delegations
- Constitution of Colorado
- Index of Colorado-related articles
- List of counties in Colorado
- List of governors of Colorado
- List of lieutenant governors of Colorado
- Outline of Colorado
