= A. S. Embree =

Canadian-American union organizer

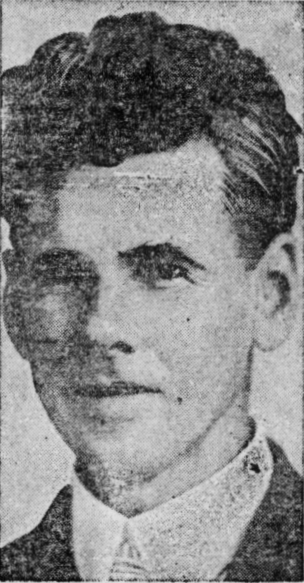
- Born: 1877 December 15; Blackhead, Newfoundland
- Died: 1957
- Occupation: Labor leader
- Employer: Industrial Workers of the World (IWW)
- Movement: Industrial Unionism
- Spouse: Lucy Ladd Mackenzie
- Children: 3
- Parents: Jeremiah Embree; Annie Elizabeth Embree

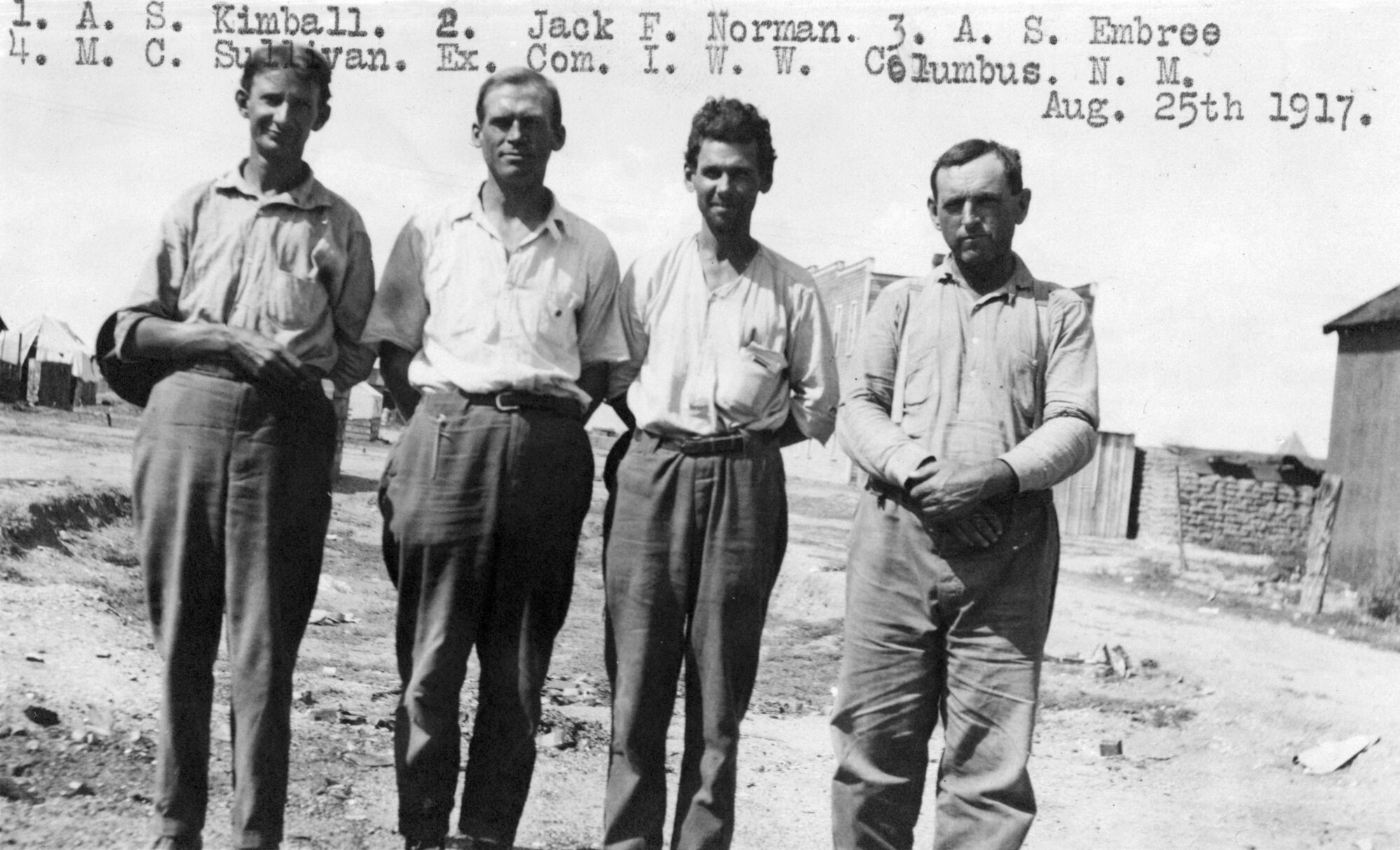
Workers deported during the Bisbee Deportation, including A.S Embree

Adolphus Stewart Embree (1877–1957), born Adolphus Nelson Stewart McKenzie Embree, was a Canadian-American union organizer, metal assayer, and leader in the Industrial Workers of the World (IWW). Embree served as the secretary-treasurer pro tempore of the national IWW for a period of two months after the national office was raided by federal agents.

== Biography ==
Embree was born on December 15, 1877, in Blackhead, Newfoundland, Canada, to Jeremiah and Annie Elizabeth Embree. Jeremiah was a Methodist Minister in Blackhead. Embree graduated from Mount Allison University on June 1, 1897, with honors in science. Embree's mother and father died in 1889 and 1890 respectively. Following his father's death, in 1890, he moved to British Columbia. On May 28, 1908, he married Lucy Ladd Mackenzie in Greenwood, British Columbia. According to the wedding announcement, the couple boarded a train to Nome, Alaska, that same afternoon. In either 1908 or 1909, Adolphus and Lucy immigrated to the United States. They had three children, William M. Embree (1910-?), John Howard Embree (1913-1917), Lucy Ladd (Una) Embree (1919-?)

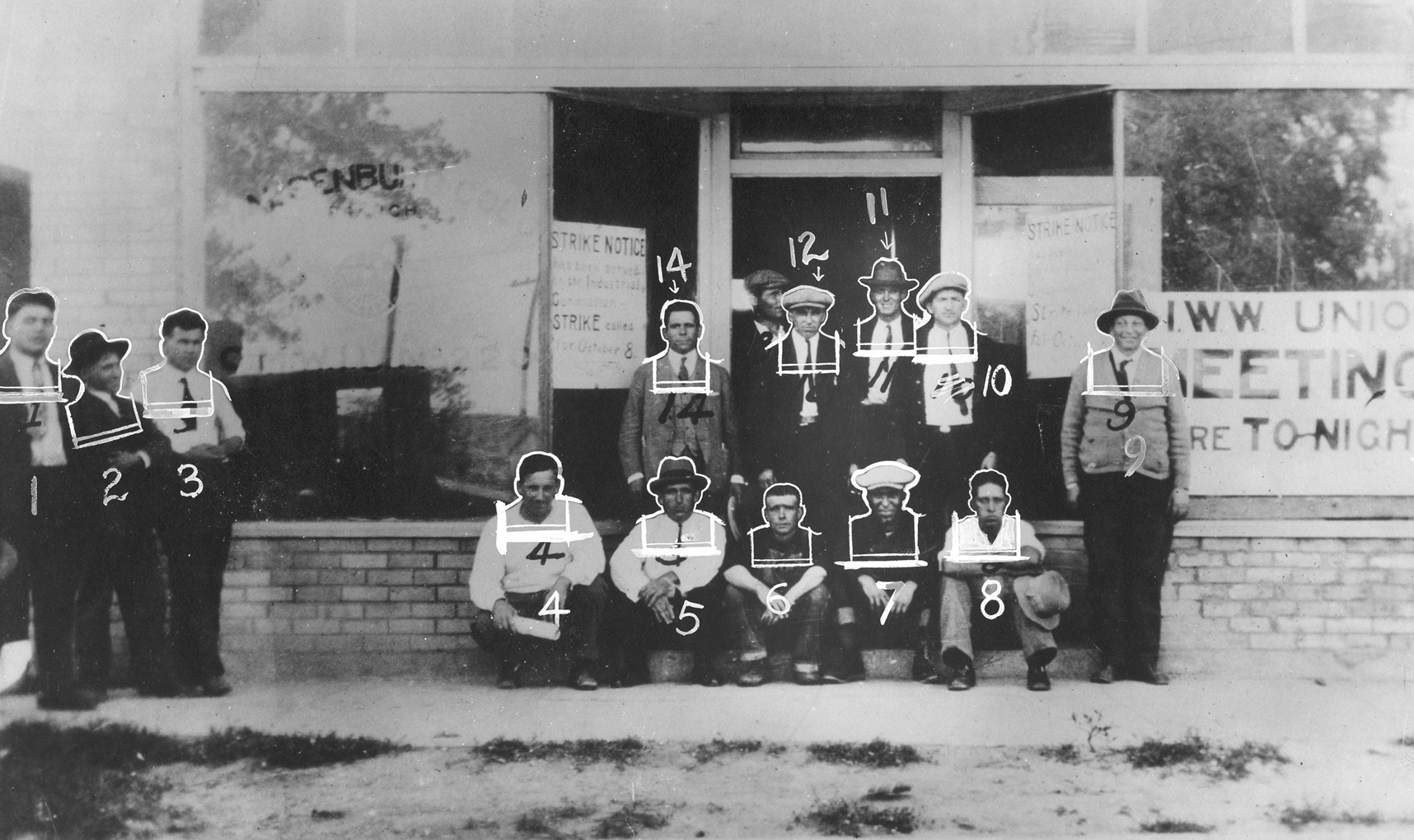
IWW Leaders in front of IWW Hall, Walsenburg just prior to 1927–1928 Colorado Coal Strike A. S. Embree is #3

Embree was the editor of the Nome Industrial Worker in Nome, Alaska and chairman of the Bisbee, Arizona IWW strike committee. He was among the union men deported during the Bisbee Deportation, July 12, 1917. He later returned to Bisbee, and was arrested on a charge of inciting a riot. After a change of venue, he was tried in Tucson, and acquitted minutes after testimony was completed. Embree then again returned to Bisbee, and was jailed for three months, and threatened with lynching if he did not leave for good.

Embree sought relief from the federal government, arguing that he had the right to live with his wife and children wherever he chose. The federal government informed him that they saw no grounds on which to intervene.

He then worked as an organizer in Butte, Montana, and then traveled to Idaho, where he was arrested for making speeches and distributing literature for the IWW. Embree was convicted of violating Idaho's Criminal Syndicalism Act in Shoshone County in 1921, and spent more than three years in jail. After he was released, he began organizing coal miners in Colorado in March 1926, focusing in particular on Walsenburg, Colorado.

The subsequent strike involved a statewide walkout of twelve thousand miners. The strike is best known for the Columbine Mine Massacre.

In August 1939, Embree was working as an organizer for the International Union of Mine, Mill, and Smelter Workers (IUMMSW) in Silverton, Colorado. He and the secretary of the Silverton local were forced into an automobile and deported. The National Labor Relations Board stepped in and ordered back pay for miners who had also been evicted.

Embree died in 1957.

== Bibliography ==
- British Columbia. Division of Vital Statistics (1908-05-28). "Marriage Registration" (JPEG). Royal British Columbia Museum. Greenwood, BC. Archived from the original on 2025-04-23.
- Campbell-Hale, Leigh (2013). Remembering Ludlow but Forgetting the Columbine: The 1927-1928 Colorado Coal Strike. thesis (Doctor of Philosophy thesis). Boulder, CO: University of Colorado.
- Foner, Philip Sheldon (1987). History of the Labor Movement in the United States: Labor and World War I, 1914-1918. Vol. 7 (1st ed.). New York: International Publishers Company. p. 278. ISBN 9780717806386. OCLC 15793788.
- "I.W.W. Organizer is Sent to Prison". Mining and Scientific Press. 122: 789. June 4, 1921 – via archive.org.
- Kohn, Stephen Martin (1994). American Political Prisoners: Prosecutions Under the Espionage and Sedition Acts (1st ed.). Westport, CT: Praeger. p. 170. ISBN 9780275944155. OCLC 29031281.
- Newfoundland, Department of Tourism, Culture, and Recreation. "Ancestry Library Edition". Ancestry.com. p. 136.
- Smith, Gibbs M. (1969). Joe Hill. Salt Lake City, UT: University of Utah Press. OCLC 60955.
- Walsh, John William (2000). "Parish Records, Conception Bay North ~ Northern District, Blackhead - Methodist Parish Birth Records (1842 - 1900)". NL GenWeb. Archived from the original on 2024-12-26.
