= Bisbee Deportation =

1917 illegal deportation of miners attempting unionization in Arizona, United States

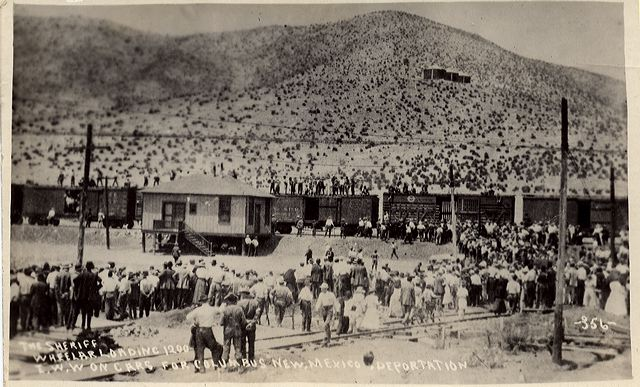
- Striking miners and others being deported from Bisbee on the morning of July 12, 1917. The men are boarding the cattle cars provided by the El Paso and Southwestern Railroad.
- Date: July 12, 1917
- Location: Bisbee, Arizona; Jerome, Arizona
- Goals: Union organizing
- Methods: Strikes, protest, demonstrations
- Result: ~1,300 miners deported from Arizona

Parties
International Union of Mine, Mill, and Smelter Workers; Industrial Workers of the World	Phelps Dodge Corporation; Sherriff's deputies

Lead figures
Charles Moyer; A. S. Embree	Walter S. Douglas,(President of the Phelps Dodge Copper Queen Mine); John C. Greenway (General Manager of The Calumet and Arizona Mining Company of Warren), Lemuel C. Shattuck (Owner and General Manager of the Shattuck-Denn Mine) Harry C. Wheeler

Number
2,000 protesters	2,200

Casualties and losses
Deaths: 1 Injuries: Arrests: 1,300+	Deaths: 1 Injuries:

The Bisbee Deportation was the illegal kidnapping and deportation of about 1,300 striking mine workers, their supporters, and citizen bystanders by 2,000 members of a deputized posse, who arrested them beginning on July 12, 1917, in Bisbee, Arizona. The action was orchestrated by Phelps Dodge, the major mining company in the area, which provided lists of workers and others who were to be arrested to the Cochise County sheriff, Harry C. Wheeler. Those arrested were taken to a local baseball park before being loaded onto cattle cars and deported 200 miles (320 km) to Tres Hermanas in New Mexico.

The 16-hour journey was through desert without food and with little water. Once unloaded, the deportees, most without money or transportation, were warned against returning to Bisbee. The U.S. government soon brought in members of the U.S. Army to assist with relocating the deportees to Columbus, New Mexico.

As Phelps Dodge, in collusion with the sheriff, had closed down access to outside communications, it was some time before the story was reported. The company presented their action as reducing threats to United States interests in World War I in Europe, largely because the wartime demand for copper was heavy. The Governor of New Mexico, in consultation with President Woodrow Wilson, provided temporary housing for the deportees. A presidential mediation commission investigated the actions in November 1917, and in its final report, described the deportation as "wholly illegal and without authority in law, either State or Federal (Page 6)."

No individual, company, or agency was ever convicted in connection with the deportations. Arizona and Cochise County never prosecuted the case, and in United States v. Wheeler (1920), the Supreme Court ruled that the Constitution by itself does not give the federal government the power to stop kidnappings, even ones involving moving abductees across state lines on federally-regulated railroads.

== Background ==
In 1917, the Phelps Dodge Corporation owned a number of copper and other mines in Arizona. Mining conditions in the region were difficult, and working conditions (including mine safety, pay, and camp living conditions) were extremely poor. Discrimination against Mexican American and immigrant workers (often Balkan) by European-American supervisors was routine and extensive. During the winter of 1915–16, a successful if bitter four-month strike in the Clifton-Morenci district led to widespread discontent and unionization among miners in the state.

But, the International Union of Mine, Mill, and Smelter Workers (IUMMSW) and its president, Charles Moyer, did little to support the nascent union movement. Between February and May 1917, the Industrial Workers of the World (IWW) stepped in and began signing up several hundred miners as members. The IWW formed Metal Mine Workers Union No. 800. Although Local 800 counted more than 1,000 members, only about 400 paid dues.

== Strike ==
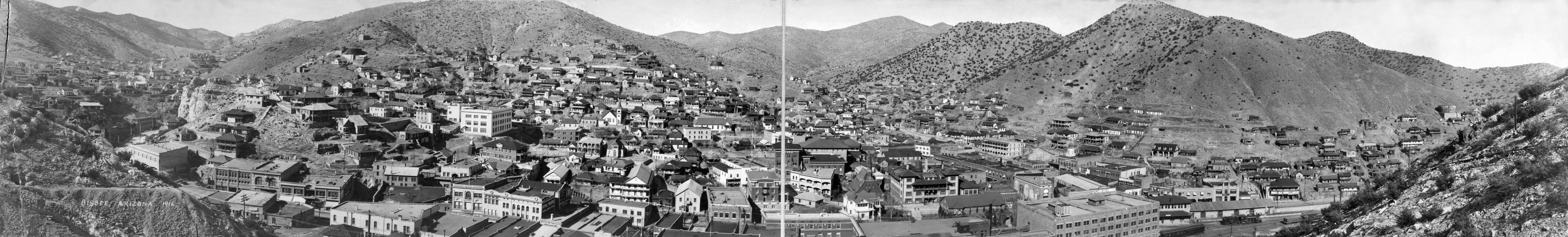
A panoramic view of Bisbee, Arizona, in 1916, shortly before the Bisbee Deportation

The town of Bisbee had about 8,000 citizens in 1917. The city was dominated by Phelps Dodge (which owned the Copper Queen Mine) and two other mining firms: the Calumet and Arizona Co., and the Shattuck Arizona Co. Phelps Dodge was by far the largest company and employer in the area; it also owned the largest hotel in town, the hospital, the only department store, the town library, and the town newspaper, the Bisbee Daily Review.

In May 1917, IWW Local 800 presented a list of demands to Phelps Dodge. They asked for an end to physical examinations after shifts (used by the mine owners to counter theft), having two workers on each drilling machine, two men working the ore elevators, an end to blasting while men were in the mine, an end to the bonus system, (Note: Under the bonus system, miners were paid more money not only for mining more ore, but for mining high-quality ore. Since only a few veins were of the highest-quality ore, assignment to these veins was very important. Mine supervisors routinely discriminated and played favorites among the miners when assigning the high-grade veins.) no more assignment of construction work to miners, (Note: Construction work was unpaid.) replacement of the sliding scale of wages with a $6.00 per day shift rate, and no discrimination against union members. The company refused all the demands.

IWW Local 800 called a strike to begin on June 26, 1917. When the strike occurred as scheduled, not only the miners at Phelps Dodge, but also those at other mines walked out. More than 3,000 miners—about 85 percent of all mine workers in Bisbee—went on strike.

Although the strike was peaceful, local authorities immediately asked for federal troops to break the strike. Cochise County Sheriff Harry Wheeler set up his headquarters in Bisbee on the first day of the strike. On July 2, Wheeler asked Republican Governor Thomas Edward Campbell to request federal troops, suggesting the strike threatened US war interests: "The whole thing appears to be pro-German and anti-American." Campbell quickly telegraphed the White House and made the request, but President Woodrow Wilson declined to send in the Army. He appointed former Arizona Governor George W. P. Hunt as a mediator.

The president of Phelps Dodge at the time was Walter Stuart Douglas. He was the son of Dr. James Douglas, developer of the Copper Queen mine and a member of the board of directors of the Phelps Dodge Corporation. Douglas was a political opponent of Governor Hunt and had virulently attacked him for refusing, as governor, to send the state militia to suppress strikes in the mining industry. Douglas was also president of the American Mining Congress, an employer association. He had won office by vowing to break every union in every mine and restore the open shop. Determined to keep Bisbee free of IWW influence, in 1916, Douglas established a Citizens' Protective League, composed of business leaders and middle-class residents. He also organized a Workmen's Loyalty League, some of whose members were IUMMSW miners.

== Deportations ==

=== Jerome ===
On July 5, 1917, an IWW local in Jerome, Arizona, struck Phelps Dodge. Douglas ordered his mine superintendents to remove the miners from the town, in what became known as the Jerome Deportation. Mine supervisors, joined by 250 local businessmen and members of the IUMMSW, began rounding up suspected IWW members at dawn on July 10. More than 100 men were abducted by these vigilantes and held in the county jail (with the cooperation of the Yavapai County sheriff). Later that day, 67 men were deported by train to Needles, California, and ordered not to return. When the IWW protested to Governor Campbell, he declared that the IWW had "threatened" the governor.

=== Bisbee ===
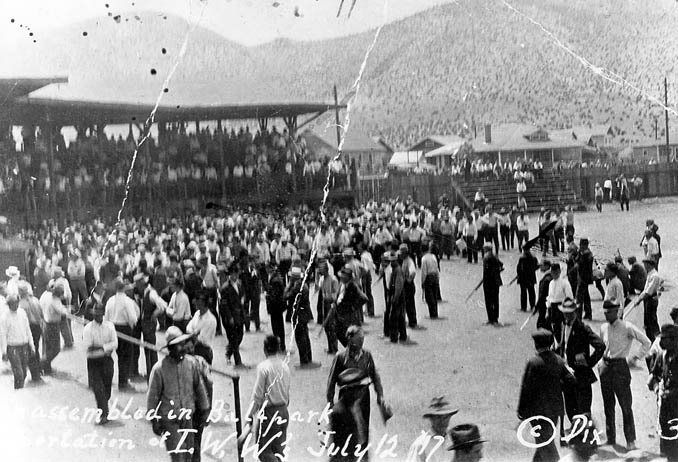
Striking miners and others rounded up by the armed posse on July 12, 1917, sit in the bleachers in Warren Ballpark. Armed members of the posse patrol the infield.

The Jerome Deportation proved to be a test run for Phelps Dodge, which ordered the same plan, but larger in scale, in Bisbee.

On July 11, 1917, Sheriff Wheeler met with Phelps Dodge corporate executives to plan the deportation of striking miners. Some 2,200 men from Bisbee and the nearby town of Douglas were recruited and deputized as a posse—one of the largest posses ever assembled. Phelps Dodge officials also met with executives of the El Paso and Southwestern Railroad, who agreed to provide rail transportation for any deportees. The morning of July 12, the Bisbee Daily Review carried a notice announcing that:

...a Sheriff's posse of 1,200 men in Bisbee and 1,000 men in Douglas, all loyal Americans, [had formed] for the purpose of arresting on the charges of vagrancy, treason, and of being disturbers of the peace of Cochise County all those strange men who have congregated here from other parts and sections for the purpose of harassing and intimidating all men who desire to pursue their daily toil.

A similar notice was posted throughout the town on fence posts, telephone poles and walls.

At 4:00 a.m., July 12, 1917, the 2,200 deputies dispersed through the town of Bisbee and took up their planned positions. Each wore a white armband for identification, and carried a list of the men on strike. At 6:30 a.m., the deputies moved through town and arrested every man on their list, as well as any man who refused to work in the mines. Several men who owned local grocery stores were also arrested. In the process, the deputies took cash from the registers and all the goods they could carry. They arrested many male citizens of the town, seemingly at random, and anyone who had voiced support for the strike or the IWW. Two men died: Deputy Sheriff Orson McRae was shot and killed by a miner he had tried to arrest, and the other was the miner (shot dead by three other deputies moments later).

Striking IWW miners marched at gunpoint to waiting boxcars, July 12, 1917.

At 7:30 a.m., the 2,000 arrested men were assembled in front of the Bisbee Post Office and marched two miles (3 km) to Warren Ballpark. Sheriff Wheeler oversaw the march from a car outfitted with a loaded Marlin 7.62 mm belt-fed machine gun. At the baseball field, the arrestees were told that if they denounced the IWW and went back to work, they would be freed. Only men who were not IWW members or organizers were given this choice. About 700 men agreed to these terms, while the rest sang, jeered or shouted profanities.

At 11:00 a.m., the El Paso and Southwestern Railroad brought 23 cattle cars to Bisbee. The posse deputies forced the remaining 1,286 arrestees at gunpoint to board the cars, many of which had more than three inches (76 mm) of manure on the floor. Although temperatures were in the mid-90s Fahrenheit, (mid-30s Celsius), no water had been provided to the men since the arrests began at dawn.

The train stopped 10 miles (16 km) east of Douglas to take on water, some of which was provided to the deportees in the packed cars. Deputies manned two machine guns from nearby hilltops to guard the train, while another 200 armed men patrolled the tracks. The train continued to Columbus, New Mexico (about 175 miles (282 km) away), arriving at about 9:30 p.m. Initially prevented from unloading at Columbus, the train slowly traveled west another 20 miles (32 km) to Hermanas, not stopping until 3:00 a.m.

During the Bisbee Deportation, Phelps Dodge executives seized control of the telegraph and telephones to prevent news of the arrests and expulsion from being reported. Company executives refused to let Western Union send wires out of town, and stopped Associated Press reporters from filing stories. News of the Bisbee Deportation was made known only after an IWW attorney, who met the train in Hermanas, issued a press release.

With 1,300 penniless men in Hermanas, the Luna County sheriff worriedly wired the Governor of New Mexico for instructions. Republican Governor Washington Ellsworth Lindsey said the men should be treated humanely and fed; he urgently contacted President Wilson and asked for assistance. Wilson ordered U.S. Army troops to escort the men to Columbus, New Mexico. The deportees were housed in tents originally intended for use by Mexican refugees, who had fled across the border to the United States to escape the Mexican Army's Pancho Villa Expedition. The men were allowed to stay in the camp for two months until September 17, 1917.

== Aftermath ==
From the day of the deportations until November 1917, the Citizens' Protective League ruled Bisbee. Based in a building owned by the copper companies, its representatives interrogated residents about their political beliefs with respect to unions and the war, determining who could work or obtain a draft deferment. Sheriff Wheeler established guards at all entrances to Bisbee and Douglas. Anyone seeking to exit or enter the town over the next several months had to have a "passport" issued by Wheeler. Any adult male in town who was not known to the sheriff's men was brought before a secret sheriff's kangaroo court. Hundreds of citizens were tried, and most of them were deported and threatened with lynching if they returned. Even long-time citizens of Bisbee were deported by this "court".

When ordered to cease these activities by the Arizona Attorney General, Wheeler tried to explain his actions. Asked what law supported his actions, he answered:

I have no statute that I had in mind. Perhaps everything that I did wasn't legal....It became a question of 'Are you American, or are you not?'" He told the Attorney General: "I would repeat the operation any time I find my own people endangered by a mob composed of eighty percent aliens and enemies of my Government."

These actions took place during a period in the early 20th century when attacks by anarchists and labor unrest and violence erupted in numerous American cities and industries. Many native-born Americans were worried about such actions, attributing the unrest to the high numbers of immigrants, rather than to the poor working conditions in many industries. As a result, national press reaction to the Bisbee Deportation was muted. Although many newspapers carried stories about the event, most of them editorialized that the workers "must have" been violent, and therefore "gotten what they deserved", thus criminalizing the victims. Some major papers said that Sheriff Wheeler had gone too far, but declared that he should have imprisoned the miners rather than deported them.

The New York Times criticized the violence on the part of the mine owners and suggested that mass arrests "on vagrancy charges" would have been appropriate. Former President Theodore Roosevelt said that "no human being in his senses doubts that the men deported from Bisbee were bent on destruction and murder."

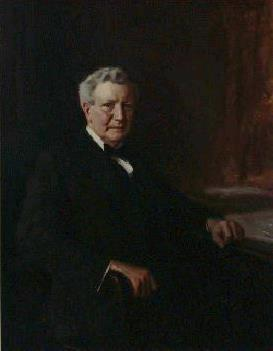
Then Secretary of Labor William Wilson

The men deported from Bisbee pleaded with President Wilson for protection and permission to return to their homes. In October 1917, Wilson appointed a commission of five individuals to investigate labor disputes in Arizona. They were led by Secretary of Labor William B. Wilson (with support from Assistant Secretary of Labor Felix Frankfurter, future Associate Justice of the US Supreme Court). The commission heard testimony during the first five days of November 1917. In its final report, issued on November 6, 1917, the commission denounced the Bisbee Deportation. "The deportation was wholly illegal and without authority in law, either State or Federal," the commissioners wrote.

== Prosecution ==
On May 15, 1918, the U.S. Department of Justice ordered the arrest of 21 Phelps Dodge executives, including some from the Calumet and Arizona Co., and several elected leaders and law enforcement officers from Bisbee and Cochise Counties. The arrestees included Walter S. Douglas. Sheriff Wheeler was not arrested because he was by then serving in France with the American Expeditionary Force during World War I.

A pre-trial motion by the defense led a federal district court to release the 21 men on the grounds that no federal laws had been violated. The Justice Department appealed, but in United States v. Wheeler, 254 U.S. 281 (1920), Chief Justice Edward Douglass White wrote for an 8-to-1 majority that the U.S. Constitution did not empower the federal government to enforce the rights of the deportees. Rather, it "necessarily assumed the continued possession by the states of the reserved power to deal with free residence, ingress and egress." Only in a case of "state discriminatory action" would the federal government have a role to play.

Arizona officials never initiated criminal proceedings in state court against those responsible for the deportation of workers and their lost wages and other losses. Some workers filed civil suits, but in the first case the jury determined that the deportations represented good public policy and refused to grant relief. Most of the other suits were quietly dropped, although a few workers received payments in the range of $500 to $1,250.

The Bisbee Deportations were later used by some proponents as an argument in favor of stronger laws against unpopular speech. Such laws would be justified as empowering the government to suppress disloyal speech and activity, and remove the need for citizens groups to take actions the government could not. During World War I, the federal government used the Sedition Act of 1918 to prosecute people for statements in opposition to the war.

At the end of the conflict, Attorney General A. Mitchell Palmer and others advocated for a peacetime equivalent of the Sedition Act, using the Bisbee events as a justification. They claimed that the only reason the company representatives and local law enforcement had taken the law into their own hands was that the government lacked the power to suppress radical sentiment directly. If the government were armed with appropriate legislation and the threat of long prison terms, private citizens would not feel the need to act. Writing in 1920, Harvard Professor Zechariah Chafee mocked that view: "Doubtless some governmental action was required to protect pacifists and extreme radicals from mob violence, but incarceration for a period of twenty years seems a very queer kind of protection."

There was a second round of trials in 1920, wherein 210 defendants were brought before the court in January 1920. The initial number of defendants was approximately 300, and preliminary hearings began on July 11, 1919, headed by Cochise County prosecutor, Robert N. French, and continued though September. October, November and December were spent collecting depositions. The first defendant was Henry E. Wootten, whose trial began on March 11, 1920. During the jury selection process in February, French was taken ill, and attorney A. A. Worsley was named to succeed him as prosecutor.

Upon French's recovery by the end of February, he again took the reins of the prosecution, with Worsley assisting. The trial lasted through March and April, and on April 30, after a 16-minute deliberation, Wootten was acquitted of the kidnapping charges. There followed several other trials, including the "blanket case", which included about 150 defendants.

=== Effects ===
The later history of American deportations of alleged radicals and other undesirables from the country did not follow the precedent of Bisbee and Jerome, which were considered vigilante actions by private citizens. Instead, later deportations were authorized by law and executed by government agents. These actions were criticized by contemporaries at the time on the basis of public policy and the U.S. Constitution, as well as extensively by later analysts. Each case has involved discriminatory actions against ethnic minorities (and sometimes immigrants).

The most notable have included the following:

- deportation from the United States of supposed foreign anarchists during the Red Scare of 1919–20;
- mass deportations of up to 2 million Mexicans and Mexican-American workers (the latter citizens of the United States) between 1929 and 1936, during the Great Depression;
- relocation of 120,000 Japanese national and Japanese Americans to internment camps during World War II, causing them extensive losses of jobs and property; and
- 1954 removal by the Immigration and Naturalization Service of approximately a million Mexican nationals living in the U.S. without the legal right to do so. Many Mexican workers had been recruited during the war years, but in the postwar period, the U.S. did not want them competing with American workers. In what is known as Operation Wetback, several hundred U.S. citizens were also deported by mistake, because of lack of due process.

== See also ==
- 1927–1928 Colorado Coal Strike
- Anti-union violence
- Bisbee '17, 2018 film of the events
- Company town
- Freedom of movement under United States law
- Institutional racism
- List of kidnappings (1900–1929)
