= Volosko =

Settlement and part of Opatija, Croatia

Coordinates: 45°21′N 14°19′E

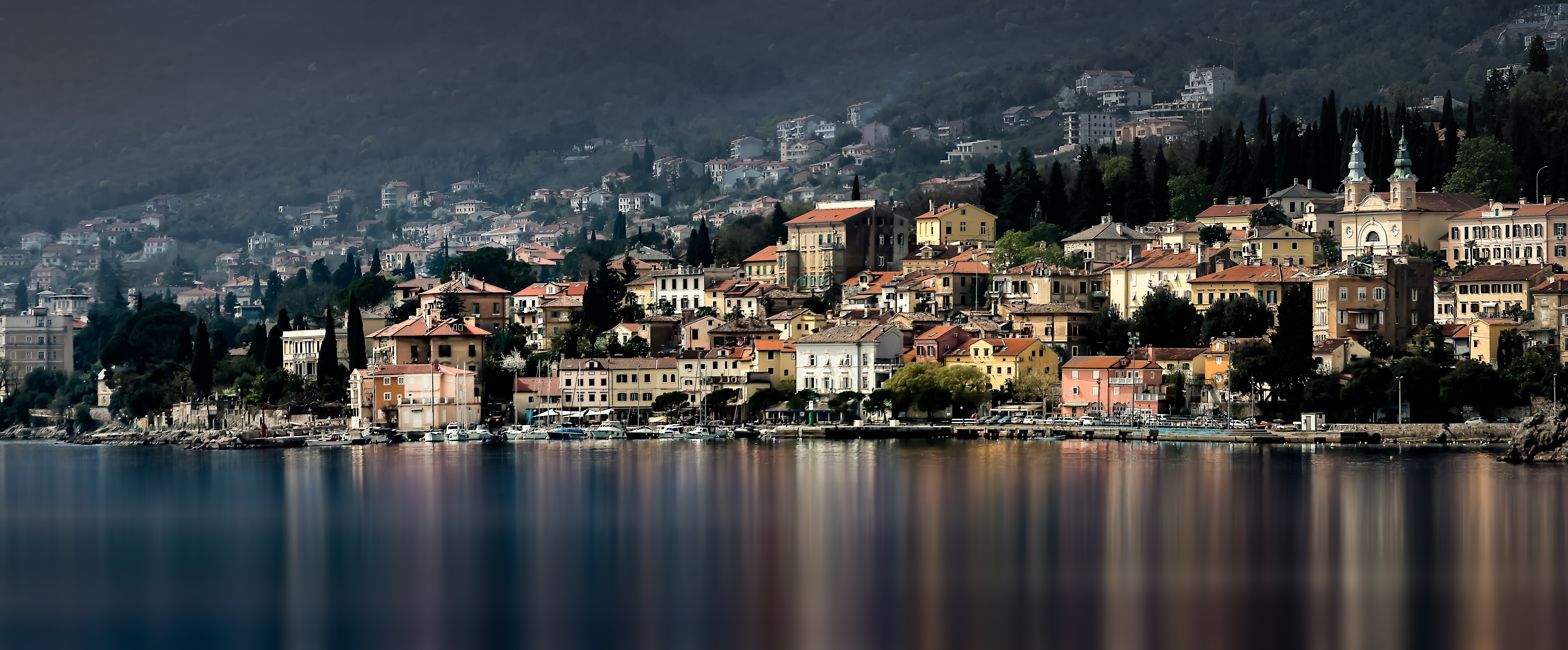
Volosko streets

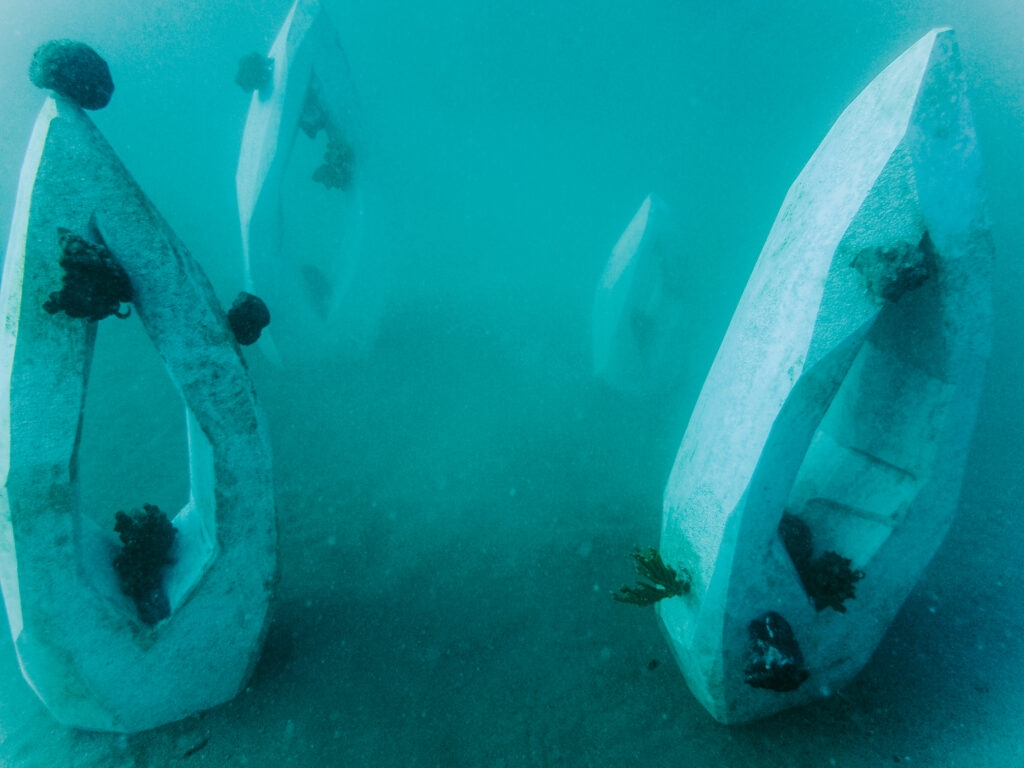
Art installation "Lautus"

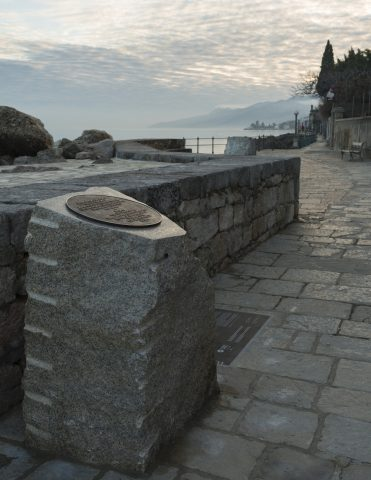
Art installation "1857"

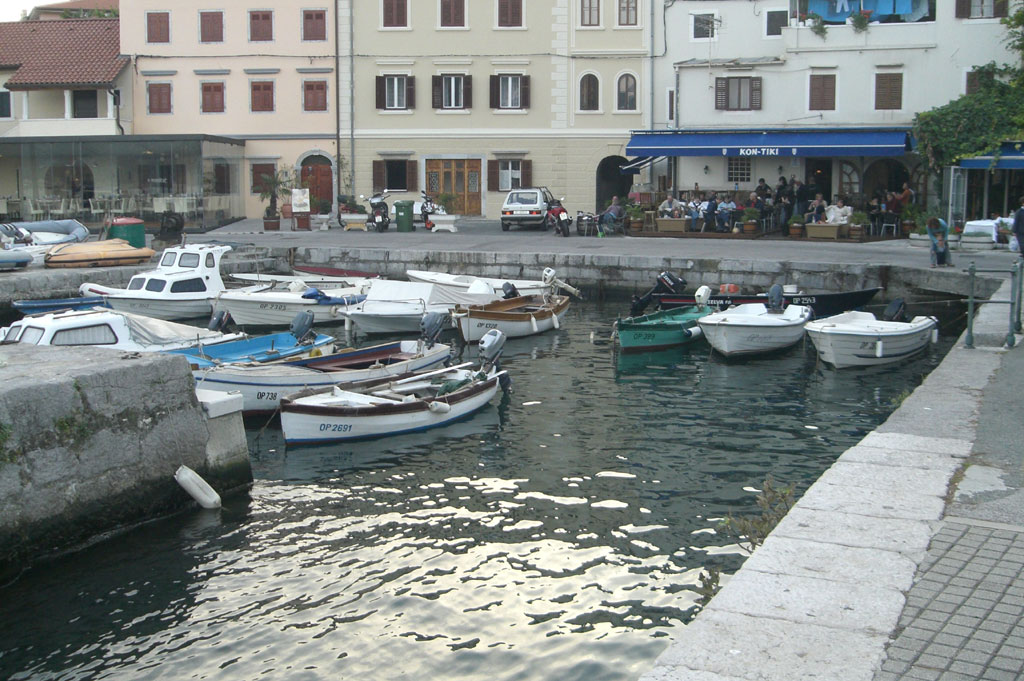
"Mandrač" in Volosko

Volosko (Italian: Volosco, Volosca) is a part of the city of Opatija, located in the Kvarner Gulf in western Croatia. It is located in the north of Opatija, on the road towards Kastav and Rijeka. The toponym Volosko derives from the name of the Slavic deity Veles.

== Climate ==
Between 1995 and 2013, the highest temperature recorded at the local weather station was 39.0 °C (102.2 °F), on 22 July 2006. The coldest temperature was −8.0 °C (17.6 °F), on 29 December 1996.

== History ==
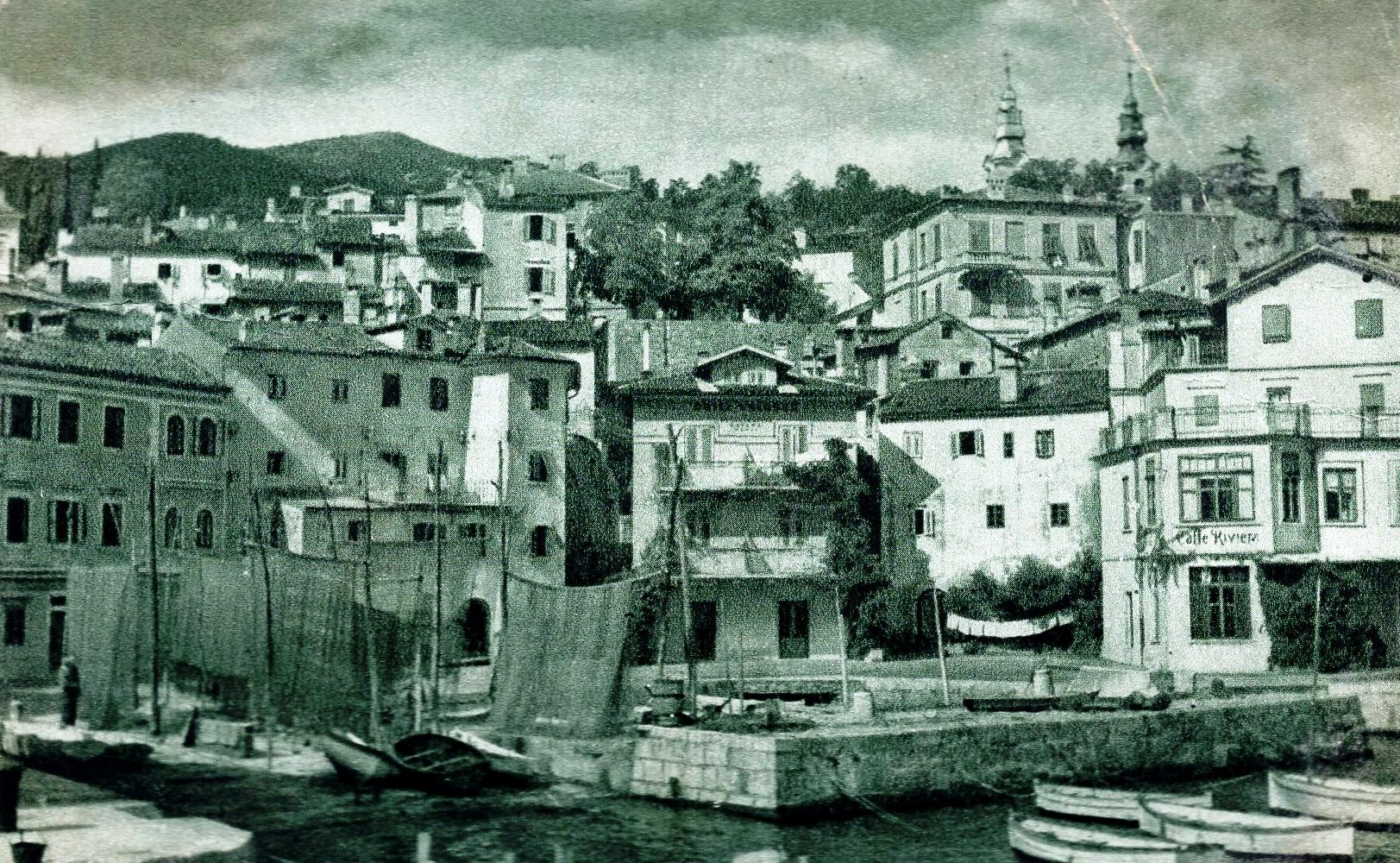
Old Postcard of Volosko, Opatia

Until 1918, the town (named VOLOSCA) was part of Cisleithania, the Austrian side of Austria-Hungary after 1867, head of the district of the same name, one of the 11 Bezirkshauptmannschaften in the Austrian Littoral province.

== People ==
- Amelia Milka Sablich, born there
- Andrija Mohorovičić, born there
- Gyula Andrássy, died there
- Emil Sax, died there
- Rokse mali bokse, born there

== Monuments and sights ==
=== Art installations "Lautus" and "1857" ===
A permanent underwater site-specific art installation under the name "Lautus" (lat. cleaner) by artist Nika Laginja from Opatija can be found in the Voloscan bay 15 meters below sea level. It consists of mosses, shellfish, sponges and other organisms that act as sea cleaners and grow over the years. In addition to contributing to the restoration of underwater biodiversity, this stone installation also conveys a message of individual engagement and taking responsibility for the world in which we live.

As a response to Nika Laginja's underwater project, Czech artist Jiří Kovanda created the minimalist site-specific art installation "1857" which found its permanent home at the very beginning of the Lungomare promenade. Inspired by local nature and its history, Kovanda places his work near the birthplace of Andrija Mohorovičić, highlighting the distribution of the Adriatic Fucus, an endangered marine species today, back in 1857 when this prominent scientist was born.

== Film location ==
Several scenes of The Legacy Run were shot in Volosko.

== Windsurfing ==
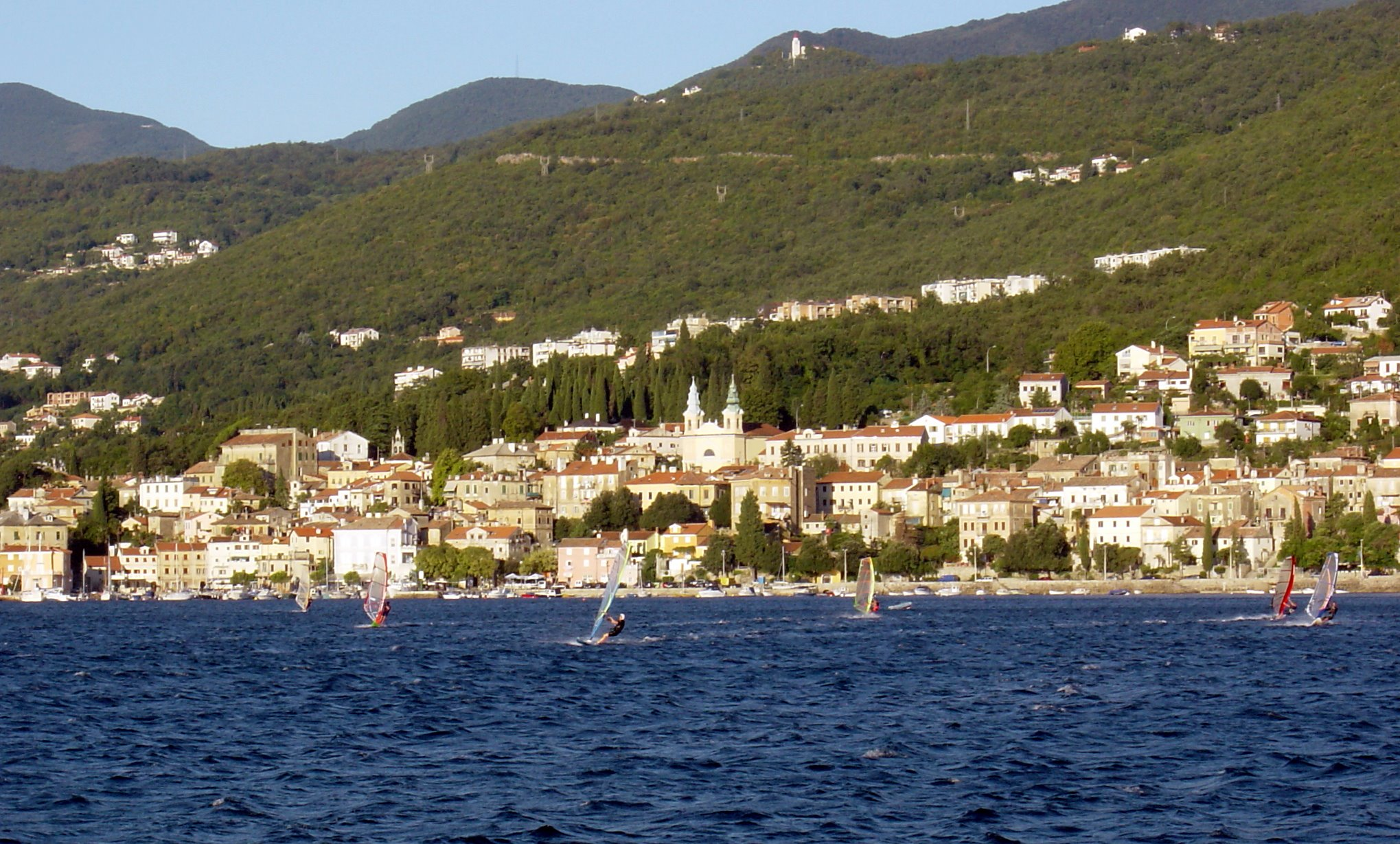
A panorama of Volosko from the Preluka Bay

Volosko is situated on the west side of Preluka Bay, which is known for good windsurfing and sailing conditions. Daily thermal winds, locally known as Tramuntana, blow regularly from the north each morning, peaking just after sunrise and ending a few hours later.

Under prolonged high pressure systems, weather conditions may become stable, creating persistent winds strong enough to ensure adequate windsurfing (planing conditions) for hours each morning, making the Volosko and Preluk areas one of the most consistent windsurfing spots on the Adriatic coast.

Launch spots are at the beach near the Preluk auto camp and within the Volosko harbor itself. Each season, the local windsurfing club, DSNM Volosko, organizes one or more windsurfing races, open to both professional and amateur windsurfers.

== See also ==
- Austrian Littoral
