= Emil Sax =

Austrian politician (1845–1927)

Emil Sax (German: [zaks]; 8 February 1845 – 25 March 1927) was an Austrian economist from Javorník, Austrian Silesia.

He was professor of economics at the Charles University in Prague from 1879 to 1893, and after it was split in 1882, he first became Dean of the Law College and later Rector for the German Charles-Ferdinand University. As Rector he was also Virilist ex-officio of the Bohemian Diet, and he was an elected member of the Imperial Council from 1879 to 1885. He died in Volosko, Kingdom of Yugoslavia.

== Literary works ==
- Die Wohnungszustände der arbeitenden Klassen und ihre Reform (Vienna 1869);
- Der Neubau Wiens im Zusammenhang mit der Donauregulierung (das. 1869);
- Über Lagerhäuser und Lagerscheine (das. 1869);
- Die Ökonomik der Eisenbahnen (das. 1870);
- Die Verkehrsmittel in Volks- und Staatswirtschaft (das. 1878-79, 2 Bde.);
- Das Wesen und die Aufgaben der Nationalökonomie (das. 1883);
- Grundlegung der theoretischen Staatswirtschaft (das. 1887)
