= Coal mining in Colorado =

Early coal mining in Colorado in the United States was spread across the state. Some early coal mining areas are currently inactive, including the Denver Basin and Raton Basin coal fields along the Front Range. There are currently 8 active coal mines, all in western Colorado.

== History ==
Coal mining in Colorado dates back to 1859, when a pair of men began mining a coal deposit between the gold rush settlements of Denver and Boulder.

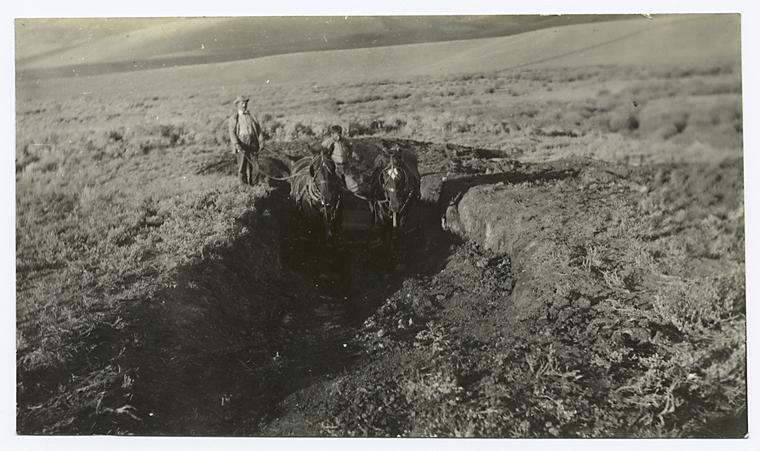
Trenching for coal in Colorado

=== Labor struggles ===
The early history of coal mining in Colorado was one of discontent on the part of miners, and periodic confrontations with the mine operators. The work was dangerous, and Colorado's death rate in the mines was high. In 1917, 121 people died in the Hastings mine explosion.

Erie, Colorado claims the first mining labor union in Colorado, which was the Knights of Labor, Local #771, established in 1878. The Knights of Labor opposed the creation of the National Federation of Miners and Mine Laborers during the 1880s. The first strike was called in 1885 by the Knights of Labor. Then in 1886 a regional miners organization was formed, called the Coal Miners' Federation of Northern Colorado.

The United Mine Workers (UMW) were defeated in large part because of the activities of a company spy in a strike in the southern field in 1903–04.

The UMW called another strike in Colorado's northern coal fields north of Denver in 1910. The strike was inconclusive, but prompted a 10 percent wage increase for ten thousand Colorado miners. The union's real target in Colorado was the larger southern field located south of Pueblo toward Trinidad. A statewide strike called in September 1913 resulted in the Ludlow Massacre. Neutralized by the dispatch of federal troops after ten days of skirmishes provoked by the massacre, the UMW essentially suspended most activities in Colorado for more than a decade. Meanwhile, the organization grew stronger in the east until about 1920, when it collapsed after a national strike.

The United Mine Workers were defeated during the 1913-14 strike in Colorado and focused their attention elsewhere. In 1927 Colorado coal miners again laid down their tools, this time under the banner of the Industrial Workers of the World (IWW). Colorado Fuel and Iron, a major conglomerate of steel mills in Pueblo and coal mines around the region, opposed the strike. The company once again hired spies to infiltrate the union.

The 1927–28 strike is best remembered for the Columbine mine massacre. This strike also led directly to Rocky Mountain Fuel Company's decision to unionize the workforce, and President Josephine Roche announced that she would recognize any union affiliated with the American Federation of Labor. In announcing this policy, President Roche avoided recognizing the radical IWW, which had successfully shut down 113 of the state's 125 coal mines. Thus, in 1928 the United Mine Workers was awarded its first contract in Colorado.

In 1933, legislation enabled unionization throughout Colorado's coal fields.

== Current production ==
Colorado is the eleventh largest coal-producing state in the country. In 2014, Colorado mines produced 21.8 million metric tons (24.0 million short tons) of coal, and employed 2,069 miners. But in 2022, Colorado mines produced about 12.7 million metric tons of coal. Most Colorado coal is used for electric power generation. Eleven coal mines operate in Colorado, including eight underground mines in Delta, Garfield, Gunnison, La Plata, Rio Blanco, and Routt counties, and three surface mines in Moffat and Montrose counties. All active coal mines are on the western slope, although the New Elk coal mine in Las Animas County is expected to reopen in 4th quarter 2010.

In 2015, coal provided 31 TWh of electricity in Colorado, while gas supplied 12 TWh and wind made 7 TWh.

== Environmental impacts ==
Coal mining in Colorado is known to negatively impact both air and water quality. The West Elk Mine in Gunnison County is the largest methane emitter in Colorado, and in 2017 it emitted a quantity of methane equivalent to 98,000 cars.

Colorado's 8 remaining coal mines use an unknown quantity of water each year.

== See also ==
- Gold mining in Colorado
- Silver mining in Colorado
- Uranium mining in Colorado
- Mining in Colorado Springs
- Lafayette History Museum
