= Amelia Milka Sablich =

Amelia "Mildred" Milka Sablich (born 11 Jun 1908 in Trinidad, Colorado, died October 7, 1994, in Helper, Utah) also known as Flaming Milka, was 19 years old when she became a leader in the 1927 coal strike in that state. Her family emigrated to Trinidad from Volosko, Croatia, (then part of the Austro-Hungarian Empire) in 1907. Her father, Anton Sablich, worked as a coal miner in Colorado.

== Life ==
Sablich became a familiar personality throughout the United States during the months of November and December 1927. The strike in Colorado was conducted by the Industrial Workers of the World; she took an active part in it, speaking out for the cause of the miners. She wore bright red and engaged in physical fights with men (including a mine guard). Her older sister, Santa Benash, was also heavily involved in the strike.

Union organizers were locked up and/or deported whenever they could be identified; thus Sablich and other women took over the responsibility for organizing the strike.

Milka spent approximately five weeks in jail spread over at least two occasions. According to the Denver Morning Post, at one point Milka was offered her freedom if she promised not to attend any more meetings of the strikers. She refused to accept such a requirement, and she was kept in jail.

The 1927 coal strike in Colorado is best remembered as the strike in which the "first Columbine Massacre" occurred.

After the massacre and Milka's release, she toured the country giving speeches to raise money for the miners. When the strike was concluded, she enrolled in Work People's College in Duluth, Minnesota.

== See also ==
- Anti-union violence
