= Serene, Colorado =

Extinct coal mining company town in Colorado, United States

Serene, Colorado is an extinct coal mining company town that was owned by the Rocky Mountain Fuel Company. Serene was located at the site of the Columbine Mine and had company housing and a coal preparation plant. The Serene post office operated from January 25, 1923, until August 31, 1942. Serene was the site of the Columbine Mine Massacre on November 21, 1927.

== History ==
In 1927, Colorado coal miners conducted a statewide strike that had been called by the Industrial Workers of the World. The Columbine Mine at Serene was the only major coal mine in the state that continued to dig coal. In her book Once A Coal Miner, author Phyllis Smith described the company town of Serene:

...a collection of dirty company houses surrounded by a barricade of barbed wire, illuminated at night by a giant searchlight that was installed on the Columbine tipple.

In addition to living quarters for the employees of the Columbine, Serene boasted a church, a gambling hall, general store, mess hall, a house of prostitution, and the United States post office...

Because of its location, Serene was "cut off from the world and from outside workers ... despite its name, dingy little Serene epitomized the conditions the miners were striking against."

The Colorado State Ranger Unit (the former "dry unit" from prohibition days) was summoned to prevent a demonstration by striking coal miners.

Some 500 protestors showed up at the mine on the morning of November 21. The confrontation between strikers and the militia unit resulted in the Columbine Mine Massacre, in which six miners were killed by machine gun, rifle and pistol fire.

== Geography ==
Serene was located on rolling hills just west of the present-day Interstate 25 on State Highway 7, north of the State of Colorado Historical Marker that commemorates the Columbine Mine Massacre. The area that once was the company town of Serene is now a public landfill in extreme southwestern Weld County, within the town limits of Erie at 40°01′27″N 105°01′33″W.

== See also ==
- List of ghost towns in Colorado
- List of post offices in Colorado
