= 1927–1928 Colorado coal strike =

Labor strike in Colorado, US

1927-1928 Colorado coal strike
- Part of the Coal Wars
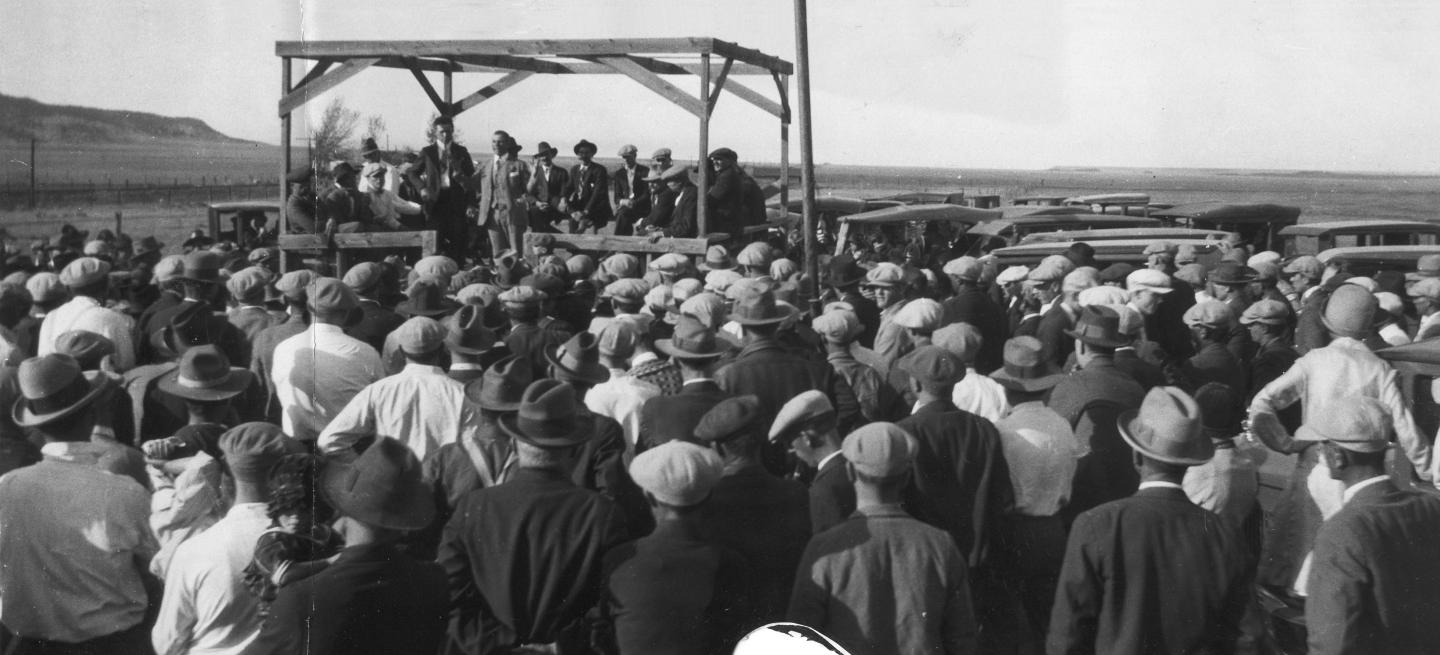
- Date: October 18, 1927 – May 1928
- Location: Colorado
- Result: Union victory, $1/day wage increase

Parties
Industrial Workers of the World	Colorado Fuel & Iron Co.; Rocky Mountain Fuel Co.; Colorado Rangers Police

Lead figures
Kristin Svanum; A. S. Embree; Adam Bell; Amelia Milka Sablich	Jesse F. Welborn; Louis Scherf

Casualties and losses
Deaths: 8 killed Injured: ~20; Arrests: +10	Deaths:
- Original basic wages before the strike were $6.27/day (Note: Basic wages does not include the amount workers were paid for output.)

The 1927–1928 Colorado coal strike was a spreading strike, spearheaded by the Industrial Workers of the World. The exact number of workers involved is unclear due to the nature of the strike. However, it shut down nearly all of Colorado's coal mines.

== Strike ==
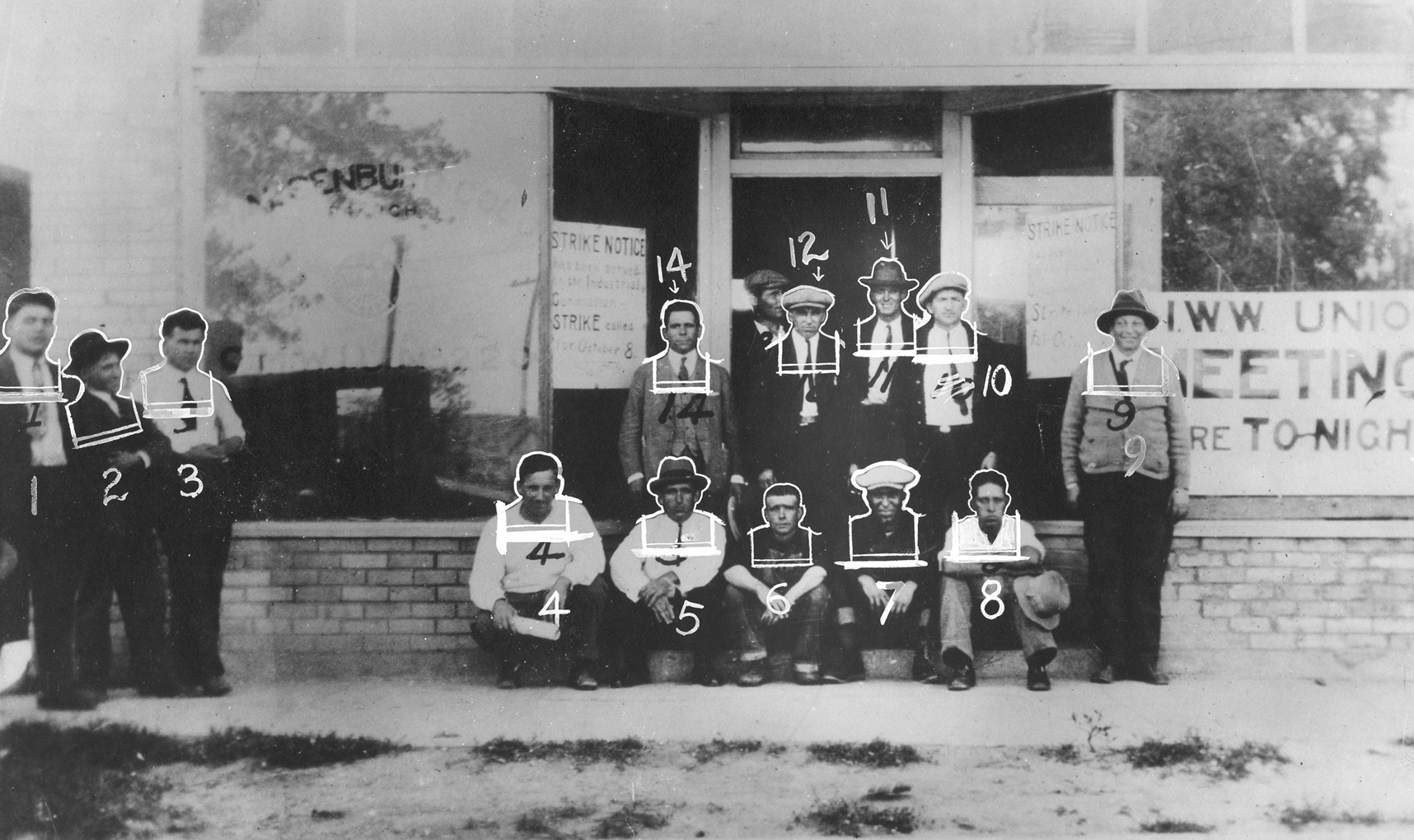
1. Nick Mavroganis; 2. Frank Mendas; 3. A. S. Embree; 4. Alberto Martinez; 5. Tom Garcia; 6. Nenesio Adillo; 7. John Maes; 8. unnamed; 9. Paul A. Sidler; 10. John Mariega; 11. A. K. Payne; 12. Gumersindo Ruiz; 13. Walter Chatterbock; 14. Jose Villa. Embree figures prominently in the CF&I spies’ reports, and Sidler/Seidler was a key strike leader who'd been jailed in World War I as a suspected German spy, according to the CF&I memo.

The strike has its immediate beginnings in 1927 when the IWW called for a three-day nationwide walkout to protest the execution of Sacco and Vanzetti.

While the United Mine Workers predicted the IWW's walkout would fail in Colorado, Sheriff Harry Capps of Huerfano County commented that "fully two-thirds of the miners in the [Walsenburg] district [are] members of the I.W.W." When the walkout occurred on August 8, 1927, out of a total 1,167 miners, 1,132 stayed off the job, and only 35 went to work. Under threat of injunction, the IWW leaders felt they'd demonstrated success, and they persuaded the miners to return to work one day early. Conlin wrote, "The tactical decision of the Wobblies was to give ground on this occasion to intensify organizing efforts for a statewide strike."

Organizing proceeded apace. In one mine, the Supervisor went to work one morning and discovered "Wobbly stickers pasted on every timber and cross beam in the place."

IWW leader Kristin Svanum met in a mass meeting with 187 delegates from 43 of the state's 125 mines to work out the miners' demands. Industrial Solidarity declared, "These mass meetings [are] to be the legislative bodies of the strikers."

The rank and file miners were given full veto power over every aspect of the pending strike. The miners elected a General Strike Committee, which had the power to appoint all other committees, with only miners eligible for committee membership. While Wobbly organizers conducted the meetings, they had no vote in the miners' decisions.

The Wobblies were careful that the strike demands reflected only the immediate needs of the workers, rather than long range goals of the IWW. The perceptions expressed in the IWW Preamble coincided with the Colorado miners' personal experiences with capitalism, and also with their feelings about the United Mine Workers union which since 1914 had seemed to ignore their needs.

All national groupings were represented on the General Strike Committee—"Mexican, Slav, Spanish, Greek, Anglo, Italian, and Negro." There were so many different nationalities in the coal towns of Colorado due to corporate recruitment policy. After the coal strike of 1903–04, the companies intentionally recruited replacement miners who would have social, cultural, and language barriers to overcome before they could unite with other miners to form unions. But the IWW, always the champion of the immigrant and the ethnic worker, had readily overcome such challenges as early as the 1912 Lawrence Textile Strike.

Immigrants aroused by injustice became targets. The Colorado newspapers railed against foreign workers and, alternately, an alleged foreign, or a lower class philosophy. For example, IWW leaders were called "tramps with their pants pressed." The Denver Morning Post criticized the strikers' spelling, their speech, their dress, their personal hygiene, and their values. The IWW responded by promoting international and ethnic solidarity. Organizers with Spanish surnames played a vital role. The more loudly the coal operators objected, the quicker the Wobbly message circulated.

The IWW was careful to follow the minutiae of Colorado law related to the pending strike, in an effort to keep the focus on the miners, rather than on the IWW itself. Nonetheless, the State Industrial Commission declared the pending strike illegal. This decision angered even established labor organizations who had not supported the strike up to that point. They considered it an affront to all of organized labor in Colorado.

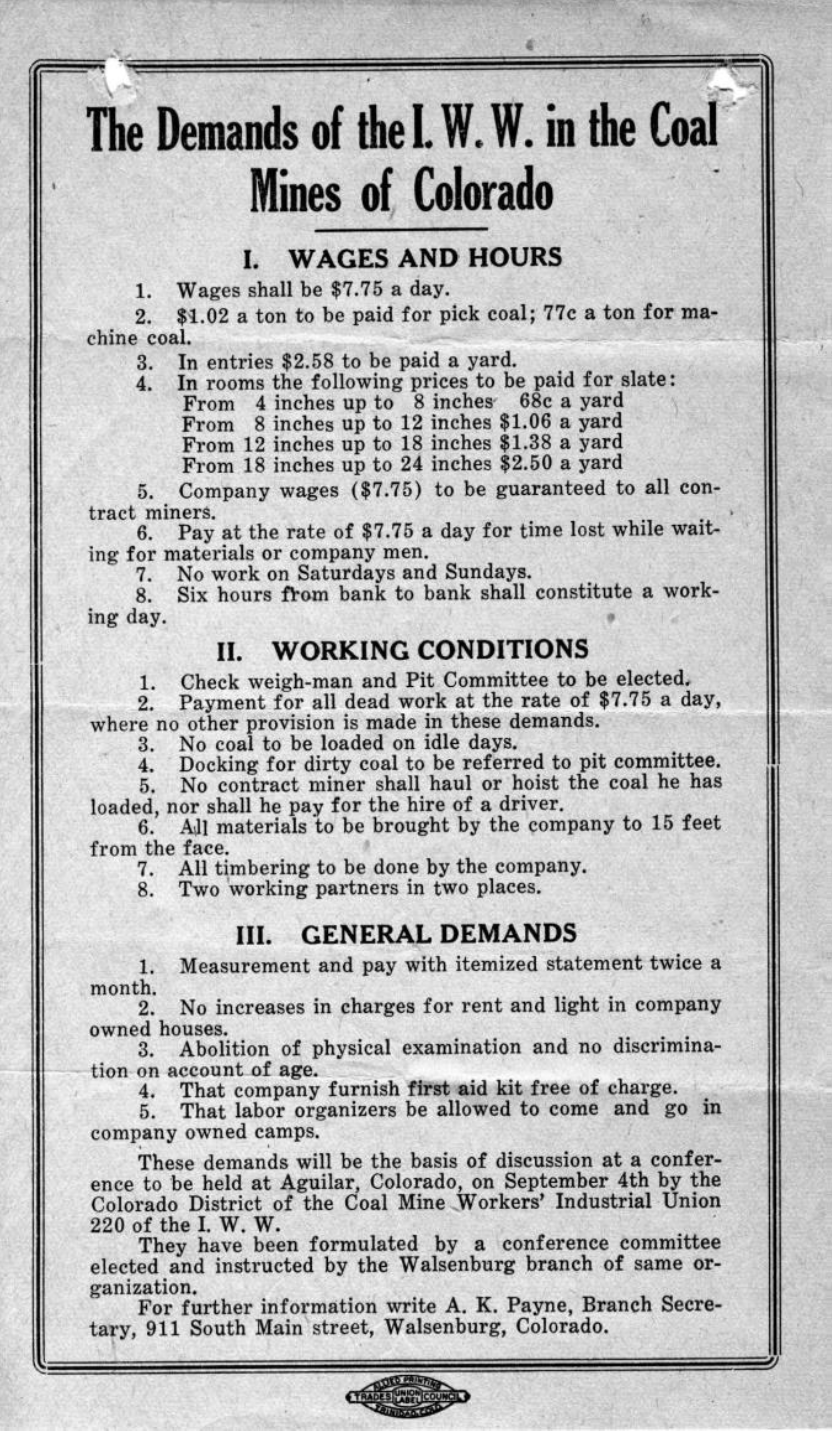

IWW organizers were arrested, beaten, and robbed. Proclamations were passed by at least six city councils ordering the IWW to leave. IWW union halls were wrecked. Strike preparations proceeded unabated, and strike votes were held throughout the state. In Lafayette, so many people arrived at the meeting hall to endorse the pending strike that the vote was moved to the football field, and conducted under the headlights of trucks. The Denver Post estimated that 4,000 attended.

Along with the coal companies, the state, and many local communities, the United Mine Workers came out publicly against the pending strike. But the strike was called in spite of the opposition, and miners walked on October 18, 1927. The strike then continued to spread across the state. After two weeks of the Wobbly-led strike, 113 Colorado coal mines had closed, and just 12 mines remained open. Joseph Conlin declared it the most successful strike in Colorado's history. The coal companies offered a non-negotiated pay increase of sixty-eight cents per day. This offer did not disrupt the strikers' motivation. On October 26, the Colorado Governor criticized the strike and called it illegal.

With IWW guidance, the General Strike Committee instructed the miners to commit no violence. The strike saw auto caravans of five hundred strikers traveling in more than a hundred vehicles, touring struck communities to dispense donated food and other provisions. This not only spread the strike, it kept up the strikers' morale. All participants were searched by their leaders for liquor or firearms before each activity.

Conlin quotes McClurg to observe that "Laws were broken, but selectively and with care." The state of Colorado banned picketing, but miners voted in mass meetings to ignore the state's ban. Colorado law outlawed red flags such as those long flown by the IWW, so the strikers carried American flags. In a further declaration of non-violent intent, the IWW admonished strikers, "If anyone is going to be killed, let it be one of our men first."

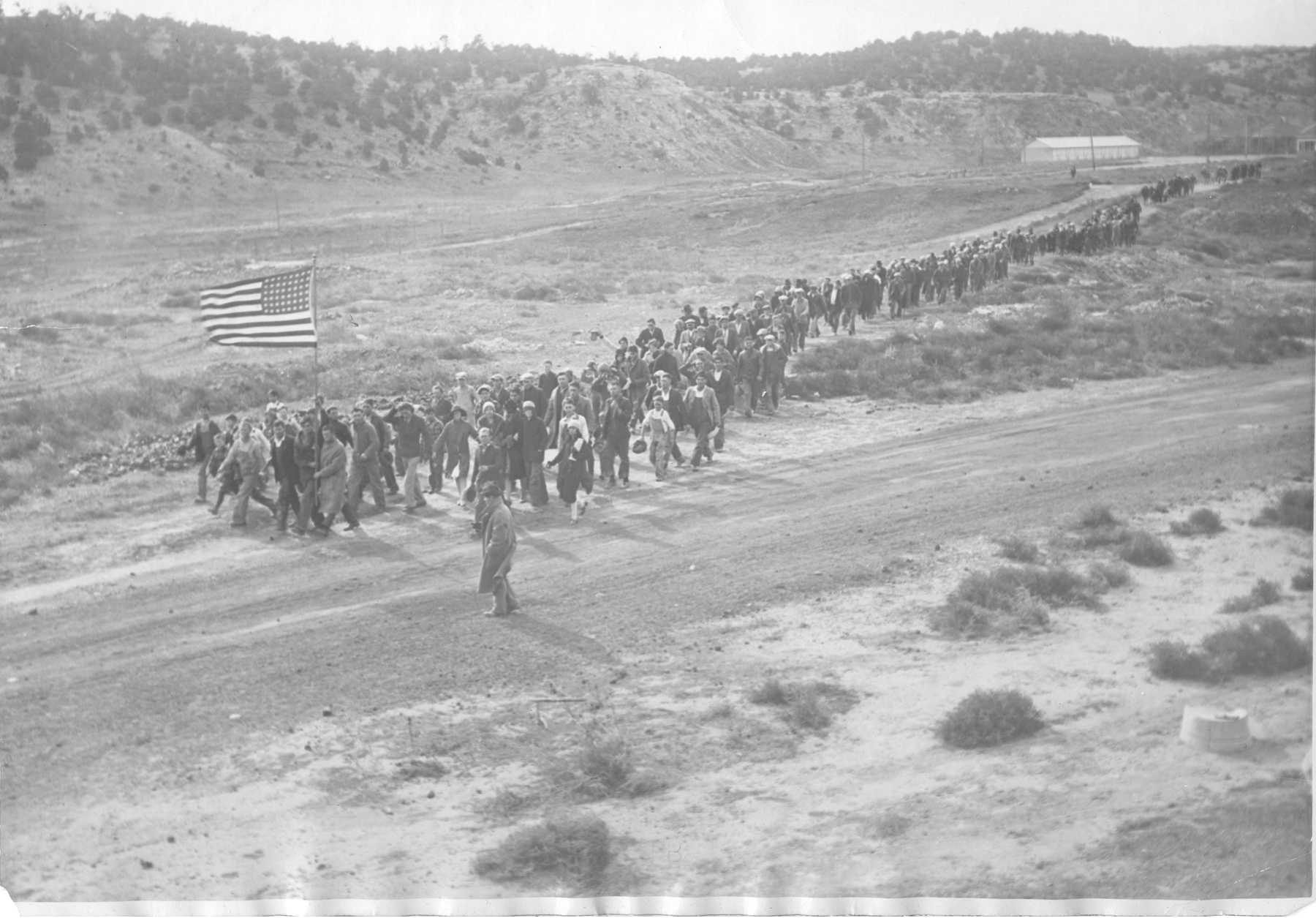
Striking workers & family marching on November 3rd.

The Columbine mine, one of the larger of the few mines still working, granted a fifty cent per day pay raise. The IWW saw this as one major coal company weakening, but announced that it was not enough. The Wobblies organized massive marches to the Columbine, numbering from 500 to 1,200 miners plus their families. They sometimes brought a five-piece brass band, and they sang union songs, satirizing the company and the police.

In one surprising episode during the strike, the IWW made an attempt to establish a workers' cooperative for striking miners at an abandoned mine. Two coal mine operators sought to demonstrate that such cooperatives were impossible, and they issued a challenge to the IWW to follow through at their facilities. However, they insisted that the IWW had to post a state-required safety bond within 24 hours, before it could reopen the mines. Since the IWW was not able to post the bond within the designated period, the experiment was not pursued.

Entire communities became organized during the 1927 strike, and they were capable of protracted militant action. One resident of a coal community spoke of the effect of the 1927 strike on students,

You'd think the coal miner was the dirtiest reptile that walked the earth. Everybody was down on the coal miner when he went on strike ... And the teachers were against us. And they had their favorites. The scabs' boys were in there too and, of course, we had gangs just like they do today. And the teachers would side with the scabs' side. Why hells bells man, we had to do something! So we organized (Junior Wobblies) at school just to protect ourselves.

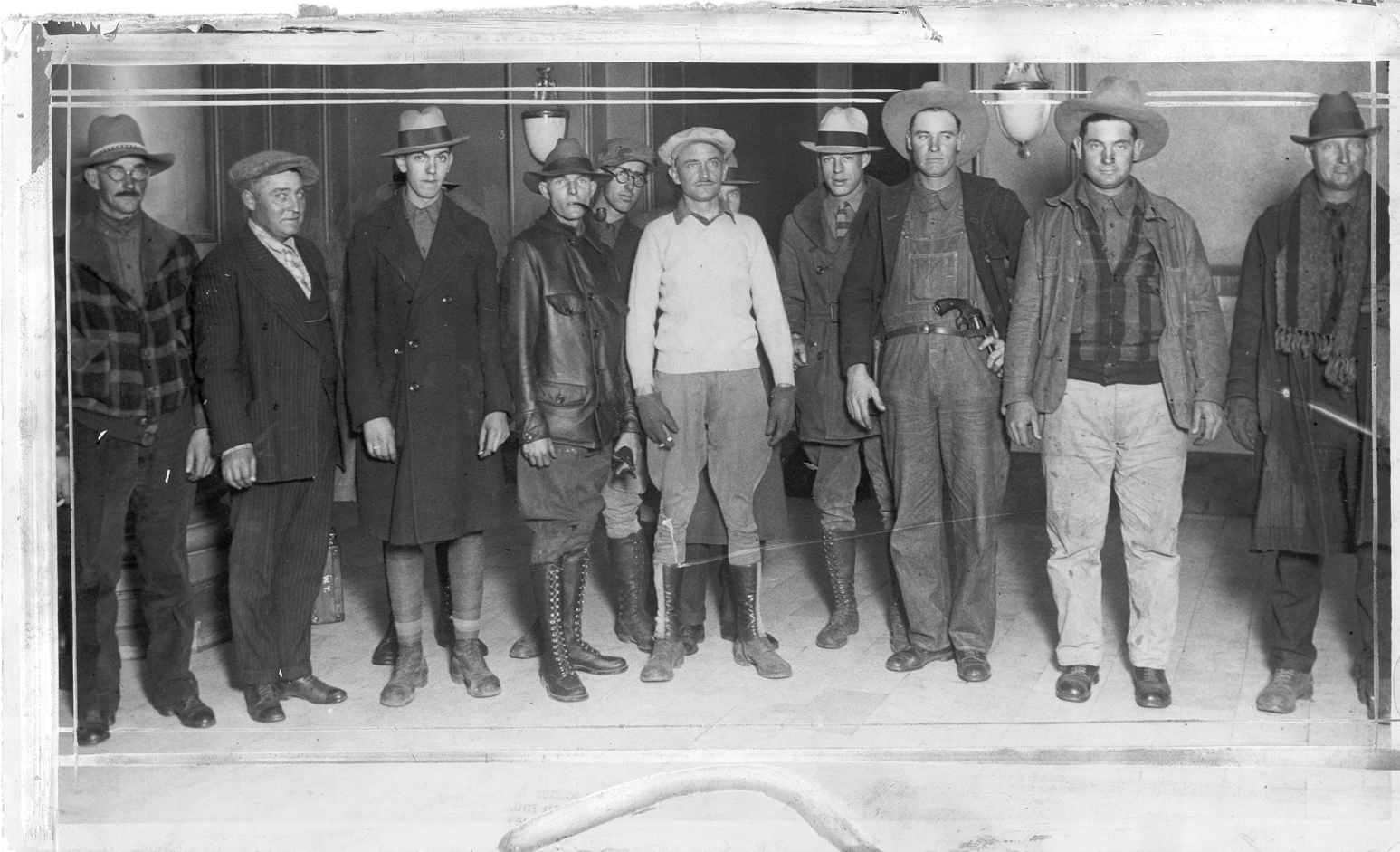
Officers of the state militia prepare to leave for a strike area. November 7, 1927 – Steelworks Center of the West

The State of Colorado and local law enforcement began to arrest every strike leader that they could identify, on vagrancy or other trumped up charges. Many were deported from the state. In Trinidad, in Walsenberg, and elsewhere, members of strikers' families stepped forward to take the place of arrested leaders, and lead the strike. Seventy-five IWW members in the Trinidad jail conducted protests that featured bonfires. Prisoners in the Lafayette jail carried on incessant singing. When they were offered their freedom, they refused to leave. A group of prisoners in Erie persuaded their jailers that deputies in Utah and Wyoming received higher pay, had better working conditions, and worked shorter hours. In Pueblo, the jail was secured by "200 deputies armed with tear bombs, machine guns, rifles, and fire engine pumpers."

=== Mine Massacre ===
Newspapers began calling for the governor to no longer withhold the "mailed fist", to strike hard and strike swiftly, and for "Machine Guns Manned By Willing Shooters" at more of the state's coal mines. Within days, on November 21, 1927, state police and mine guards fired machine guns, rifles, and pistols against 500 unarmed miners and their wives at the Columbine mine, killing six. This led to a brief cessation of picketing as strikers grieved. Now faced with their own massacre, the IWW's leaders kept their focus on the immediate goal: winning the strike. After the memorial services, when some angry miners talked about getting their guns, organizers counseled them with the words of Joe Hill: "don't mourn, organize!"

On November 26, 1927, 1,000 people gathered in Union Square, calling for the end of troop use and protesting against the recent killing of strikers. Following the Mine Massacre public pressure led to the starting of Colorado Industrial Commission formal hearings announced on December 12, 1927. The hearings were held from December 19, 1927 – February 15, 1928.

=== Other involvements ===
On December 27, 1927, Trinidad Mayor James G. Espey announced they would be deputizing civilians. The day after this, the deputized police force lashed out with violence against the strikers.

=== Walsenburg Hall Killings ===
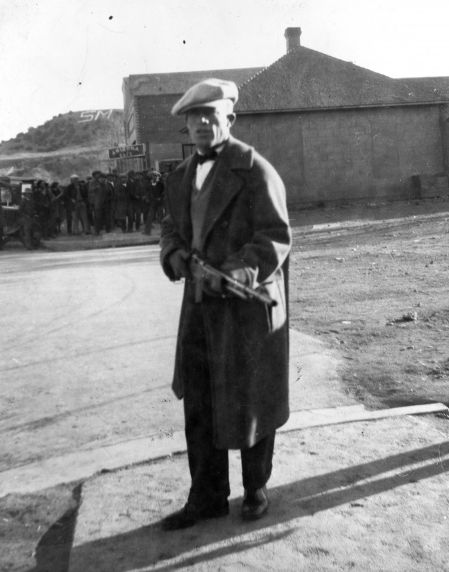
“State policeman on corner where killing took place a few minutes after shooting occurred. 'I’ll blow you to hell!' he told F.P. correspondent who was taking the picture and leveled his gun at him. Just as the picture snapped he lowered his gun. Crowd in the background is standing in front of the IWW Hall.”

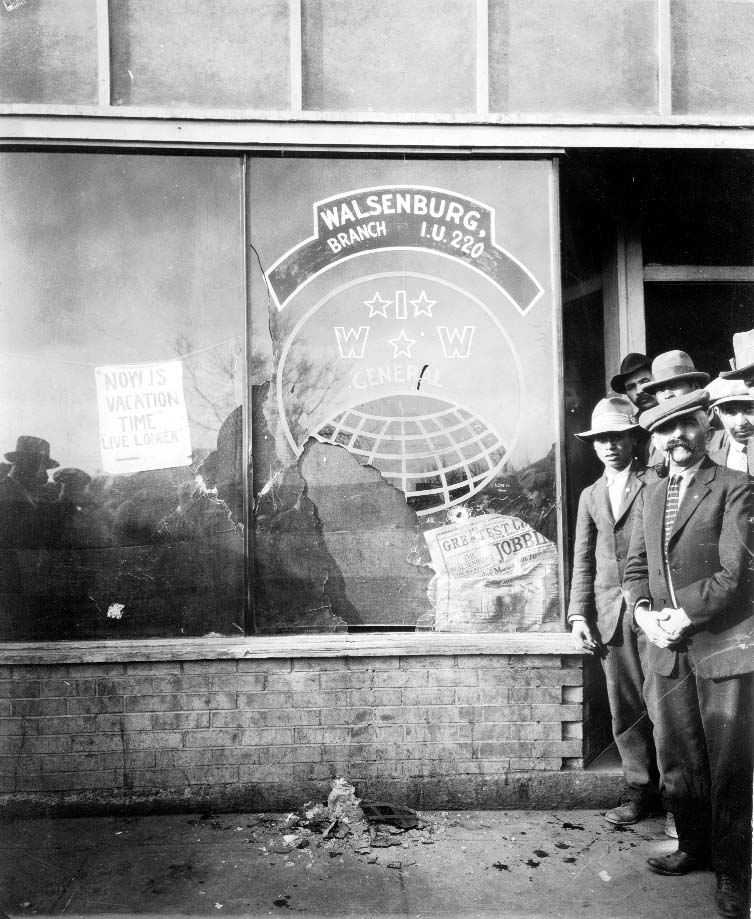
"Walsenburg hall immediately after shooting Jan. 12th 1928. Huge hole was caused by machine gun. 22 other holes in window also. The Spectator"

Writing from each photographs backside are written in quotations.

On January 12, 1928, two more people were killed by police raiding the IWW's Walsenburg IU 210-220 hall while strikers were rallying there.

A 15-year-old boy named Salastino Martinez and 40 year old wobbly Klementz Chavez were killed.

== Aftermath ==
The miners won a dollar a day increase from the 1927 strike. The miners in the northern field won union recognition from the second largest coal operator in Colorado. It was not recognition of the IWW, as it turned out. The company picked a union for the miners, and it was the United Mine Workers. Nonetheless, these were the most substantial gains the miners had ever achieved from a strike in Colorado. It was the only increase obtained by coal miners in the country during the period from 1928 to 1930.

Although the United Mine Workers in Colorado had vocally opposed the strike, they had established an official position of neutrality. However, United Mine Workers agents conducted overt actions against the strikers, including participation in vigilante raids against IWW property. Some UMW miners scabbed on the IWW strike, and others became informants for the state police. One popular United Mine Workers official, a union organizer from the Ludlow era by the name of Mike Livoda, hired himself out to the governor to spy on the Wobblies.

The most pervasive spying during the 1927 strike was most probably conducted by Colorado Fuel and Iron, the coal and steel company owned by the Rockefeller dynasty The company organized a network of spies to infiltrate, propagandize against, and disrupt the IWW. Archives currently held at the Bessemer Historical Society reveal that the company used its spies and its relationship with the authorities to compile dossiers on union activists, and to obtain photographs, IWW membership lists, private union correspondence, and other union materials related to the strike.

Summing up the Colorado coal strike, Joseph Conlin concludes that Colorado coal miners were radical, based upon their experiences, and willfully chose to have the IWW lead them. In Conlin's words, "[t]he failure of the Wobblies to establish and maintain a viable organization in Colorado resulted from the anarcho-syndicalist strategy of the IWW (i.e., no labor contracts, no union recognition), not from the absence of class consciousness and radicalism among the miners."

== See also ==
- Colorado Coalfield War, 1913-1914
- Columbine Mine Massacre
