= Columbine Mine massacre =

1927 police shooting of striking miners in Colorado, United States

- Part of the Coal Wars
- Date: November 21, 1927
- Location: Serene, Colorado, United States; 40°01′31″N 105°01′38″W

Parties
Industrial Workers of the World	Colorado Fuel & Iron Co. Rocky Mountain Fuel Co. Colorado Rangers; Colorado state police

Lead figures
Adam Bell; Amelia Milka Sablich	Jesse F. Welborn; Louis Scherf

Casualties and losses
Deaths: 6 killed Injured:~20	Deaths: None

The Columbine Mine massacre occurred in 1927, in the town of Serene, Colorado, United States. In the midst of the 1927–1928 Colorado Coal Strike across the state, workers had been picketing one of the few remaining operating mines, in Serene. A fight broke out between Colorado state militia and a group of striking coal miners, during which the unarmed miners were attacked with firearms. The miners testified that machine guns were fired at them, which the state police disputed. Six strikers were killed, and dozens were injured.

== Background ==
The company town of Serene, Colorado, nestled on a rolling hillside, was the home of the Columbine Mine. Since it was one of the few coal mines in the state to remain in operation, for the past two weeks the strikers had conducted morning rallies at Serene (by this point, the strike was five weeks old).

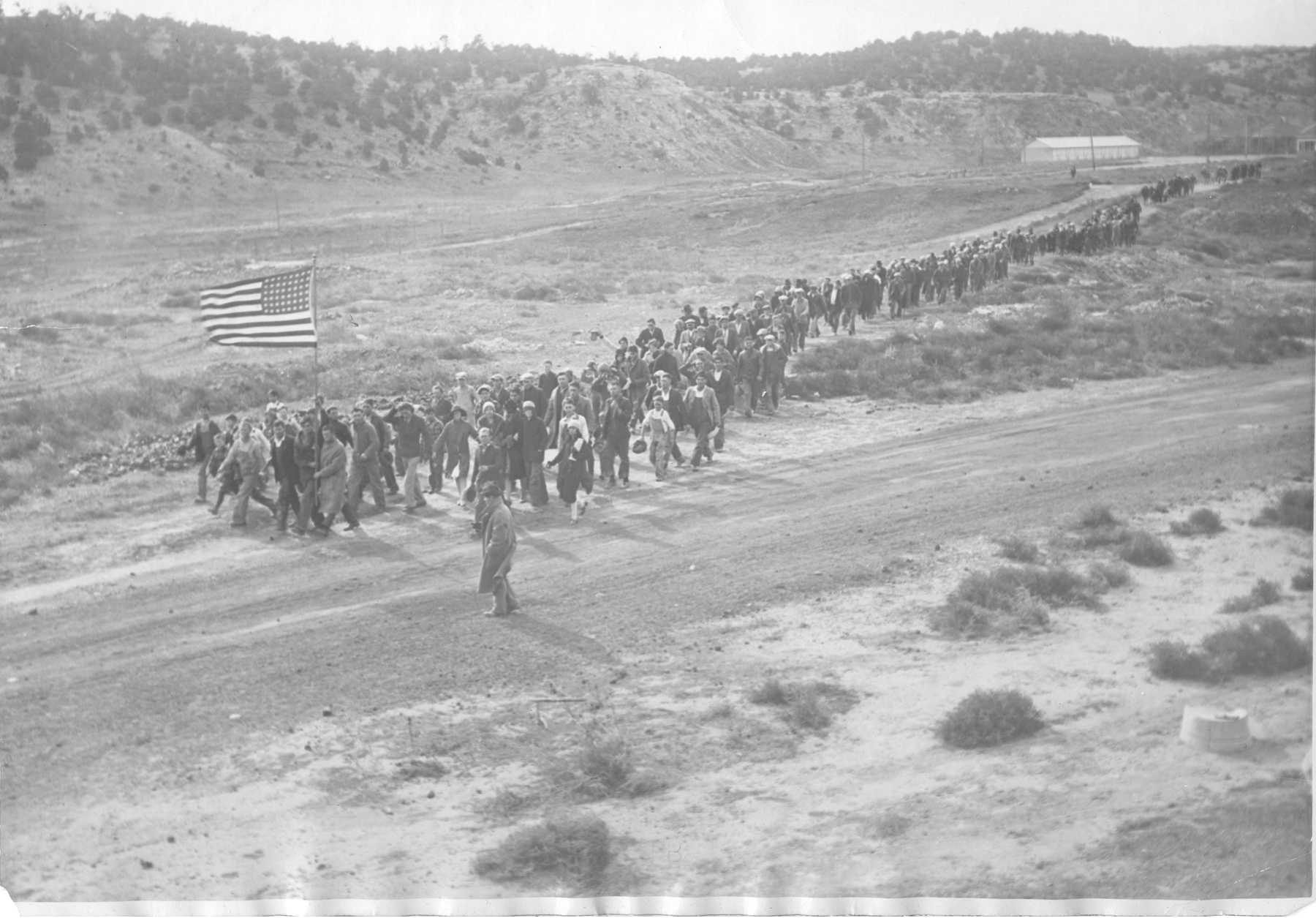
Striking workers and family marching earlier on November 3

On November 21, 1927, five hundred miners, some accompanied by their wives and children, arrived at the north gate just before dawn. They carried three United States flags.

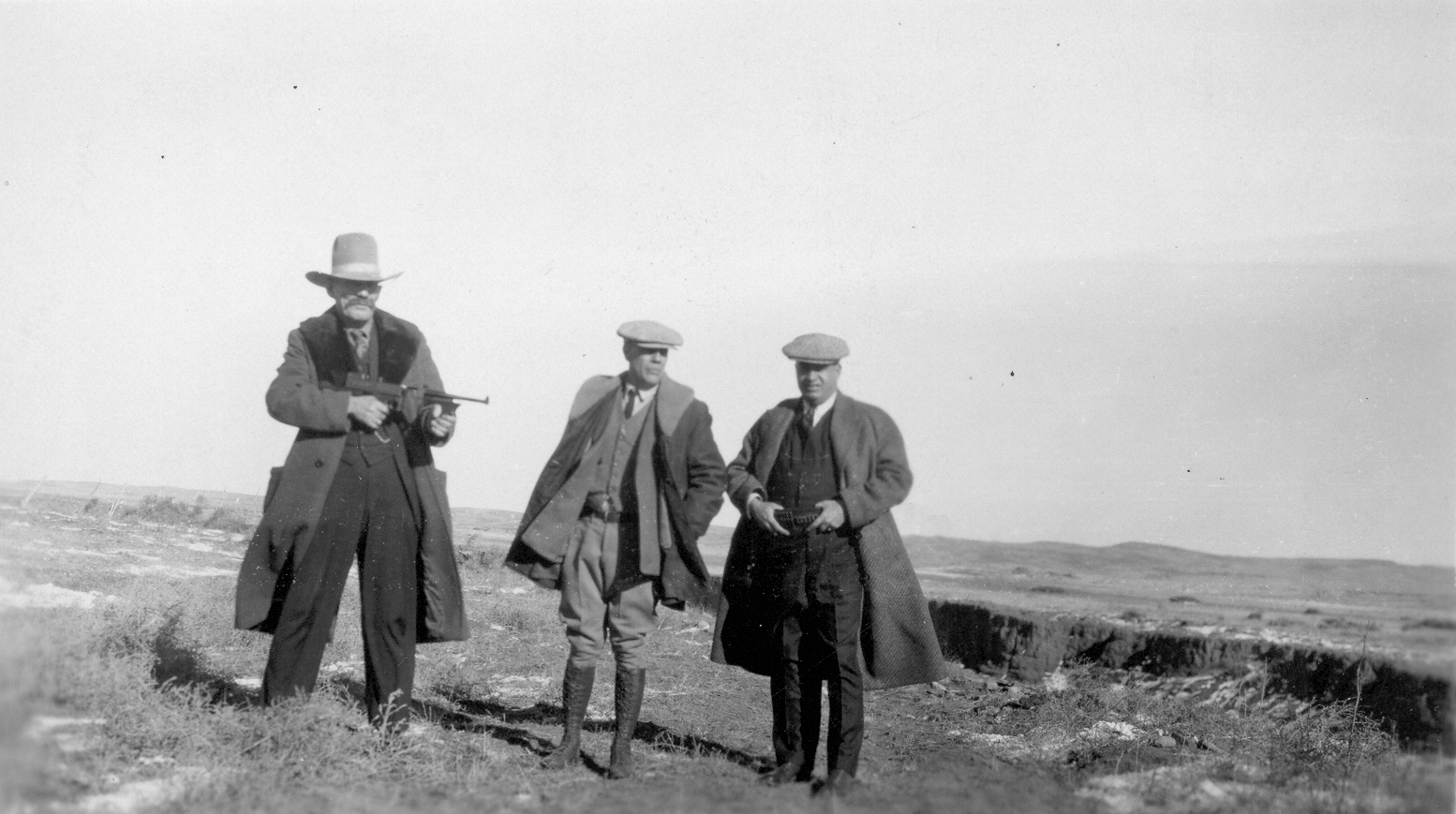
Three men pictured (presumably state militia), the only one identified is tall "Shorty" Martinez wielding a Tommy gun. – Steelworks Center of the West

That morning, the recently disbanded state police known as the Colorado Rangers were recalled to duty and would meet the picketers and bar their path. The miners were surprised to see men dressed in civilian clothes but armed with pistols, rifles, riot guns and tear gas. The Rangers were backed up by rifle-toting mine guards stationed on the mine dump. The Head of the Rangers, Louis Scherf, shouted to the strikers, "Who are your leaders?" "We're all leaders!" came the reply. Scherf announced that the strikers would not be allowed into the town, and for a few moments, the strikers hesitated outside the fence. There was discussion, with many strikers asserting their right to proceed. They argued that Serene had a public post office, and some of their children were enrolled in the school in Serene. One of the Rangers reportedly taunted, "If you want to come in here, come ahead, but we'll carry you out".

Strike leader Adam Bell stepped forward and asked for the gate to be unlocked. As he put his hand on the gate, one of the Rangers struck him with a club. A sixteen-year-old boy stood nearby and was holding one of the flags. The banner was snatched from him, and in the tug of war that followed, the flagpole broke over the fence. The miners rushed toward the gate, and suddenly the air was filled with tear gas launched by the police. A tear gas grenade hit Mrs. Kubic in the back as she tried to flee. Some of the miners threw the tear gas grenades back.

The miners in the front of the group scaled the gate, led by Adam Bell's call of "Come on!" Three policemen pulled Bell down, viciously clubbed on the head, he fell unconscious to the ground. A battle raged over his prostrate form, the miners shielding him from the Rangers. Mrs. Elizabeth Beranek, the mother of 16 children and one of the flag-bearers, tried to protect him by thrusting her flag in front of his attackers. The police turned on her, bruising her severely. Rangers reportedly seized Mrs. Beranek's flag too.

Police admitted to using clubs in the skirmish. Scherf said, "We knocked them down as fast as they came over the gate". Miners would later say that the clubs were lengths of gas pipe. A striker belted one Ranger in the face, breaking his nose. A pocketknife-wielding miner cut another on the hand while other strikers pelted the Rangers with rocks. Blood gushed from a cut above one Ranger's eye when a rock found its mark, the police then retreated.

== Massacre ==
Enraged, the strikers forced their way through the wooden gate. Jerry Davis grabbed one of the fallen flags as hundreds of angry miners surged through the entrance, others scaled the fence east of the gate.

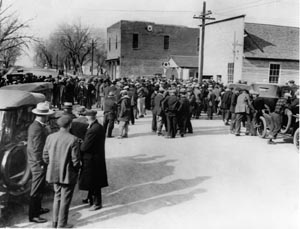
Hundreds of strikers & Wobblies standing outside the doctor’s office awaiting word on wounded fellow workers. 13 strikers in total were taken to the office.

The police retreated, forming two lines at the water tank; 120 yards (110 m) inside the fence. Louis Scherf fired two .45 caliber rounds over the heads of the strikers. His men responded with deadly fire directly into the crowd. The miners scattered, twelve remained on the ground, some dead, some injured.

At least two, and possibly three, machine guns were available at the mine. Miners later claimed that their ranks were decimated by a withering crossfire from the mine tipple – a structure where coal was loaded onto railroad cars – and from a gun on a truck near the water tank.

Five died initially, on the day of the massacre. John Eastenes, 34, of Lafayette, married and father of six children, died instantly. Nick Spanudakhis, 34, of Lafayette, lived only a few minutes. Frank Kovich of Erie, Rene Jacques, 26, of Louisville, and 21-year-old Jerry Davis died hours later in the hospital. The Flag of the United States Davis carried was riddled with seventeen bullet holes and stained with blood. Mike Vidovich of Erie, 35, died a week later of his injuries.

== Aftermath ==
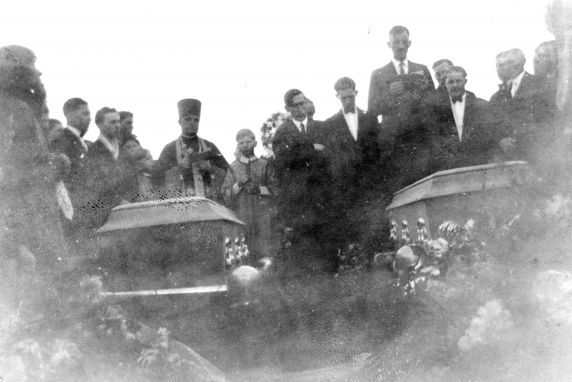
Funeral of Nick Spanudakhis and an unidentified miner

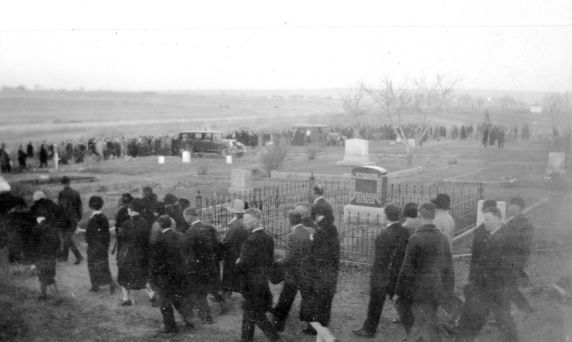
Mourners gather at Lafayette graveyard for the funeral of Nick Spanudakhis.

The state police later testified that they had not used machine guns in the fight. The miners and some witnesses testified that machine guns were used. Some witnesses identified a mine guard who had climbed the tipple and may have operated the machine gun mounted there, providing one possible explanation for the discrepancy in testimony. However, one of Scherf's men reportedly operated the machine gun near the water tank.

== See also ==
- Anti-union violence
- Ludlow massacre
- Herrin massacre
- Lattimer massacre
- Bay View Massacre
- Murder of workers in labor disputes in the United States
- List of incidents of civil unrest in the United States
- List of battles fought in Colorado
