= Professional Air Traffic Controllers Organization =

Professional Air Traffic Controllers Organization may refer to:

- Professional Air Traffic Controllers Organization (1968) - a historical trade union representing air traffic controllers until 1981.
- Professional Air Traffic Controllers Organization (AFSCME) - a division of AFSCME
- Professional Air Traffic Controllers Organization (2003) - an independent trade union
