= PATCO =

PATCO may refer to:

- Professional Air Traffic Controllers Organization (1968), a defunct American labor union famous for its failed 1981 strike
- Professional Air Traffic Controllers Organization (2003), an independent American labor union
- Professional Air Traffic Controllers Organization (AFSCME), an affiliate of the American Federation of State, County and Municipal Employees
- Port Authority Transit Corporation (PATCO), operator of the PATCO Speedline, a transit line between Philadelphia, Pennsylvania, and Camden County, New Jersey
  - PATCO Speedline, a rapid transit system running between Philadelphia, Pennsylvania and Camden County, New Jersey
