= Werner Rügemer =

German commentator, lecturer and writer (born 1941)

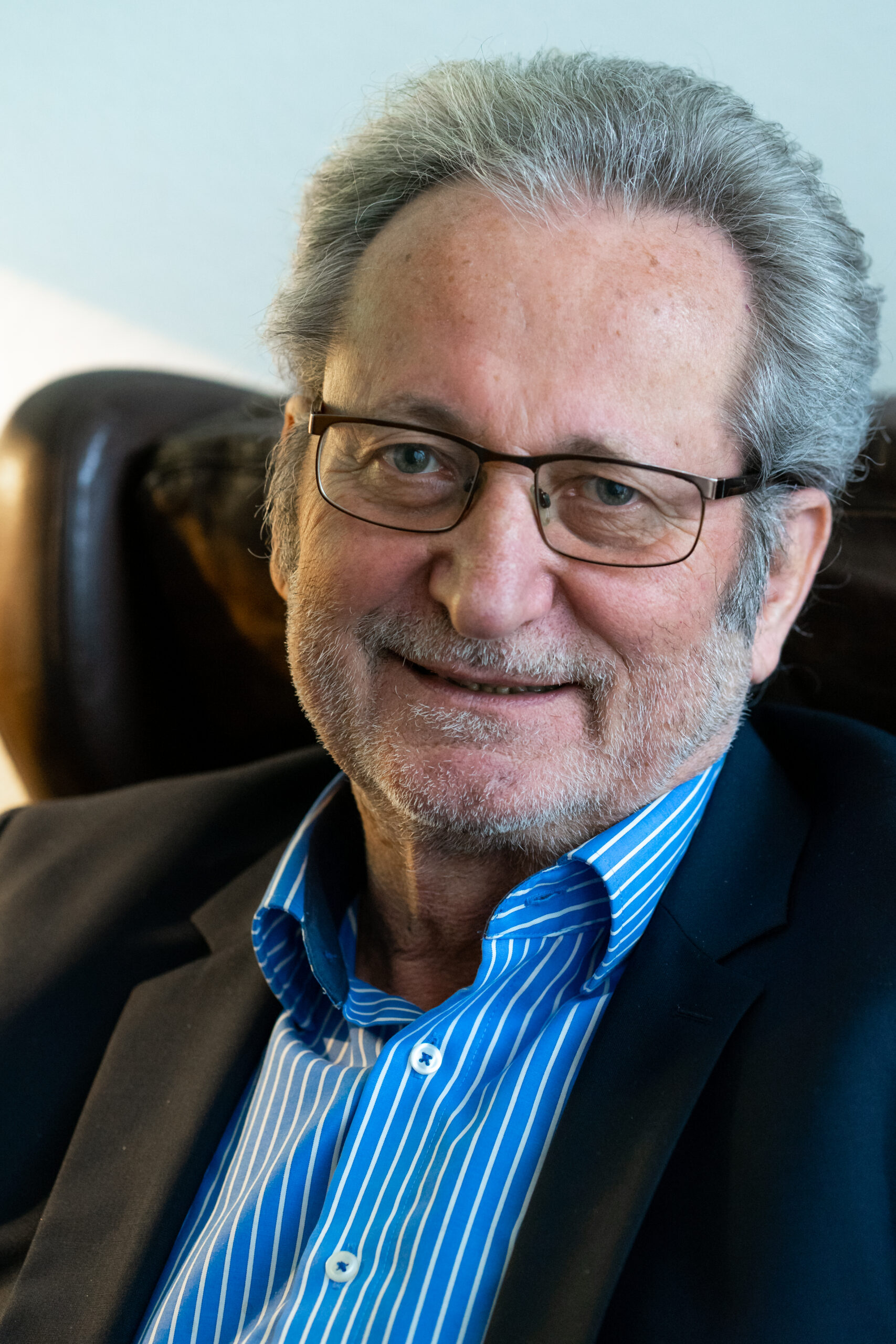
- Rügemer in 2019
- Born: September 4, 1941 (age 85); Amberg, Bavaria, Germany
- Occupations: Commentator; Lecturer; Writer

Werner Rügemer (born 4 September 1941 in Amberg) is a German journalist and non-fiction author. In his books he criticises the influence of large corporations and financial-industry actors on public affairs, through practices such as cross-border leasing, public–private partnerships, the privatization of public services, union busting (the persecution of trade unionists) and the judgments of credit rating agencies.

== Biography ==
Rügemer was born in Amberg. Originally from the Upper Palatinate region of Germany, he attended primary and secondary school in Brendlorenzen / Rhön, Bad Neustadt an der Saale and Berchtesgaden. He studied literature, philosophy and economics at LMU Munich, University of Tübingen and at universities in Berlin and Paris. In 1979 he published his doctoral thesis about the argument "Philosophical anthropology and epoch crisis" at University of Bremen, a study on the relationship between the general crisis of capitalism and the anthropological basis of philosophy as exemplified by Arnold Gehlen.

He took his Abitur in 1960 at a boarding school on the Obersalzberg near Berchtesgaden. In 1968 he was involved in Berlin with the Kritische Universität ("Critical University"). He has taught as an adjunct lecturer at the University of Cologne. Since 1989 Rügemer has been a freelance author. Until 2016 he was an author for the Blätter für deutsche und internationale Politik.

== Newspapers, magazines and books ==
After gaining some experience in journalism, he was appointed by the editor of the monthly publication Demokratische Erziehung between 1974 and 1989. Werner Rügemer has been collaborating with the world of printed papers since the 1980s and on various radio and television programmes (especially with WDR). His principal area of interest is corporate and bank crime in areas such as issues involving corruption. Werner Rügemer's work covers "Klüngel", corruption and corporate crime in his hometown of Cologne, in European municipalities and in the global economy. Rügemer criticises a tendency to pervert democracy in Germany and the "Western values community". It is his view that public debt, corruption and enrichment of elected and unelected elites have reached a level that was attributed only to "developing countries". In his publications on the 2008 financial crisis, he proposed that bad debts used for speculation should be written off and that banks should be led into an orderly insolvency.

He supports the dismantling of the three major rating agencies Standard & Poor's, Fitch Ratings and Moody's, as well as the dismissal of the Big Four accounting firms KPMG, PwC, Ernst & Young and Deloitte from their proprietary tasks.

=== New Technology - Old Society: Silicon Valley ===
In his 1984 book, Werner Rügemer described "the dark side of high tech" - a field study from California, where the digital revolution began. It contains a reflection on the history of inventions, illegal work in sweat shops, working conditions of chip workers, groundwater poisoning, interviews with Stanford scientists, trade unionists, armament engineers, fire fighters and a portrait of Steve Jobs. The book was translated in Russian and Hungarian.

=== State Secret - Discharge Water ===
The State Secret - Discharge Water (German: Staatsgeheimnis Abwasser) is a book by Rügemer from 1994, in which he wrote about the cycle of drinking water and corruption in the processing of industrial wastewater - as exemplified by the city of Cologne.

=== Economies Without Corruption? ===
Economies Without Corruption? (German: Wirtschaften ohne Korruption?) is a 1996 novel by Rügemer. The book is about the history of corruption in the Federal Republic of Germany and international practice of the US, France, Great Britain.

=== Colonia Corrupta ===
Colonia Corrupta: Privatization, Globalization and Corruption in Cologne was published in 2002. In this book he published an article about the Cologne waste incineration plant.

=== The Banker ===
In 2006, Rügemer's book Der Bankier: Ungebetener Nachruf auf Alfred Freiherr von Oppenheim ("The banker: an unrequested obituary of Alfred Freiherr von Oppenheim") was released. According to Die Zeit, long passages of the book deal with the bank's role in the Nazi-era "Aryanisations", its entanglement in illegal party financing in West Germany, and the property deals of the Esch-Oppenheim holding company with the city of Cologne.

=== 'Grasshoppers' in the Public Space ===
He talks about the disadvantages of cross-border leasing (CBL) and public–private partnership (PPP). In his work, Rügmer criticized the CBL practice of selling public properties to US private investors. The treaty was largely secret.

=== Privatization in Germany: A Financial Statement ===
In 2006, his book Privatization in Germany: A Financial Statement was published. In it he investigated a balance of privatisation projects launched and implemented since 1984, and their impact on public budgets, public services and democracy.

=== Rating Agencies: Insights Into the Present Capitalist Power ===
The reviewing economist of the Süddeutsche Zeitung, Rudolf Hickel, recommends the book to capitalism critics and supporters alike. Rügemer openly disclosed the "systematically well-maintained intransparency as well as the lack of liability for incorrect decisions" of the agencies.

=== Die Fertigmacher ===
The book Die Fertigmacher: Arbeitsunrecht und professionelle Gewerkschaftsbekämpfung (English: Work Abuse and the Fight Against Labour Unions) was published in 2014. The author portrays examples from the US and the state support from formerly German governments under Kohl, Lambsdorff and Schröder.

=== Until This Freedom Illuminates the World ===
This is an anthology from a variety of his publications. This is not only about the great questions of the transatlantic relationship, but also about what is happening in cities, churches, businesses, financial oases, streets, courtrooms, administrations, editorial offices - or in the arts, music and literature business.

=== The Capitalists of the 21st Century: An Easy-to-Understand Outline on the Rise of the New Financial Players ===
Published in 2019, English translation of the German original Die Kapitalisten des 21. Jahrhunderts. Rügemer characterizes the new types of capital organizers who became dominant through the 2008 financial crisis: BlackRock, Vanguard, State Street, Amundi, Pimco and the like in the first place; the private equity-investors like Blackstone, KKR, Carlyle in the second place; hedge funds like Elliott, Peter Thiel and Bridgewater in the third place. They became the owners of the traditional banks and industrial companies and are restructuring them. They are helped by the "private civil army of the private capital" as Rügemer calls them: accountants like Price Waterhouse Coopers, EY and KPMG; rating agencies like S&P, Moody's and Fitch; law firms like Freshfields, DLA Piper, White & Case, Hogan Lovells; management consultants like McKinsey, Accenture, Boston Consulting Group. In the second part Rügemer analyzes the increasing role of the United States of America in western Europe: Investments, military, high technology/artificial intelligence, secret services. In the third part Rügemer analyzes the alternative model of development of the People's Republic of China: after socialist revolution fast ascent to the most successful national economy with working incomes higher than in member states of the European Union and in the United States; inclusive and cooperative globalization without military escort. Finally in the fourth part Rügemer asks about the future of human society: It must be based on the international law of the UN – sovereignty of the nations, no military intervention – and the universal human rights including the social and labor rights. Also in German and French. There was a review of this book in the French newspaper L'Humanité.

=== Imperium European Union ===
Imperium EU: Labour Injustice, Crisis and New Restistances, published in 2020 (English translation in 2021), is a history of the European Union since it beginnings in the 1950s with the double US-American domination by the Marshall Plan and NATO: Americanization of the working conditions. The European Union and especially the European Commission as organizer of labor injustice including millions of migrant workers within the industries of building, logistics, meat, health services, agribusiness, platform working, gig and crowd working and low price prostitution. In the second part of the book reports about new forms of democratic and union opposition in a dozen of member and associated states of the European Union, for example in Hungary, Poland, Northern Macedonia, Lithuania, Austria, Spain, France and Switzerland.

== His affiliations ==
Werner Rügemer was co-founder of the initiative Gemeingut die Bürgerinnenhand. He served as the president of Business Crime Control. However, after serving two years, he resign as president for personal reasons. He is a member of Transparency International, the International Gramsci Society, the Association of German Writers (VS) in ver.di, the PEN Center of Germany, the attac scientific committee, and is co-founder of the Verein Aktion gegen Arbeitsunrecht.

== Accolades ==
Rügemer has won many awards throughout his career including Friedrich-and-Isabel-Vogel-Prize of the Association for German Science. In 2002, Rügemer received the Journalists' Prize of the Federation of Taxpayers. Rügemer received the Journalists' Prize of Association Enterprises (VKU) for a radio broadcast in 2003. In November 2008, Rügemer received the accolade of Karls-Preis from NRhZ-Online – Neue Rheinische Zeitung.

== Literature ==
- Die Psychoanalyse der BILD-Zeitung. 1968 (for Springer-Tribunal and Kritische Universität Berlin)
- Philosophische Anthropologie und Epochenkrise. Studie über den Zusammenhang von allgemeiner Krise des Kapitalismus und anthropologische Grundlegung der Philosophie am Beispiel Arnold Gehlens. Dissertation. Pahl-Rugenstein, Köln 1979.
- Neue Technik - alte Gesellschaft. Silicon Valley. Pahl-Rugenstein Verlag, Köln 1985, ISBN 3-7609-0955-8.
- Der Kranke Weltpolizist: Das Innenleben der USA als Gefahr für den „Rest der Welt". Köln 1986.
- Uwe Hirschfeld, Werner Rügemer (editor): Utopie und Zivilgesellschaft. Rekonstruktionen, Thesen und Informationen zu Antonio Gramsci. Berlin 1990.
- Staatsgeheimnis Abwasser. Zebulon Verlag, Düsseldorf 1995, ISBN 3-928679-32-5.
- Wirtschaften ohne Korruption? Fischer Taschenbuch Verlag, Frankfurt am Main 1996, ISBN 3-596-13211-8.
- Grüezi! Bei welchen Verbrechen dürfen wir behilflich sein? Die Schweiz als logistisches Zentrum der internationalen Wirtschaftskriminalität. Essays, Analysen und Materialien. Distel Verlag, Heilbronn 1999, ISBN 3-929348-27-6.
- Arm und reich. transcript, Bielefeld 2002 ISBN 3-933127-92-0.
- Die Berater. transcript, Bielefeld 2004, ISBN 3-89942-259-7.
- Cross-Border-Leasing. Westfälisches Dampfboot, Münster 2004, ISBN 3-89691-568-1.
- Der Bankier. Ungebetener Nachruf auf Alfred Freiherr von Oppenheim. 3. erweiterte geschwärzte Ausgabe. Nomen, Frankfurt am Main 2006, ISBN 3-939816-00-0.
- Privatisierung in Deutschland. 4. erweiterte und aktualisierte Ausgabe. Westfälisches Dampfboot, Münster 2008, ISBN 978-3-89691-630-3.
- ArbeitsUnrecht. Anklage und Alternativen. Westfälisches Dampfboot, Münster 2009, ISBN 978-3-89691-780-5.
- „Heuschrecken" im öffentlichen Raum: Public Private Partnership - Anatomie eines globalen Finanzinstruments. transcript, Bielefeld 2008, 2.Auflage 2011. ISBN 978-3-89942-851-3.
- Colonia Corrupta. Westfälisches Dampfboot, Münster 2012 / 8. Auflage 2015, ISBN 978-3-89691-525-2.
- Ratingagenturen - Einblicke in die Kapitalmacht der Gegenwart. transcript, Bielefeld, 2012, ISBN 978-3-8376-1977-5. (in Spanish) January 2013.
- Die Fertigmacher. Arbeitsunrecht und professionelle Gewerkschaftsbekämpfung. Papyrossa Verlag, Köln 2014 / Erweiterte und aktualisierte 3rd edition, March 2017 ISBN 978-3-89438-555-2.
- Bis diese Freiheit die Welt erleuchtet. Transatlantische Sittenbilder aus Politik und Wirtschaft, Geschichte und Kultur. Papyrossa-Verlag, Köln August 2016 / 2nd edition February 2017 ISBN 978-3-89438-615-3
- Die Kapitalisten des 21. Jahrhunderts. Gemeinverständlicher Abriss zum Aufstieg der neuen Finanzakteure. Papyrossa-Verlag, Köln 2018 and 3rd edition 2021 ISBN 978-3-89438-675-7
- The Capitalists of the 21st Century. An Easy-to-Understand Outline on the Rise of New Financial Players. Hamburg 2019 ISBN 978-3-7497-1162-8, 978-3-7497-1163-5, 978-3-7497-1164-2
- Imperium EU – Labor Injustice, Crisis, New Resistances. Tredition, Hamburg 2021 ISBN 978-3-347-37267-2, 978-3-347-37268-9, 978-3-347-37269-6
- Imperium EU: Arbeitsunrecht. Krise und neue Gegenwehr. Papyrossa-Verlag, Köln October 2020 ISBN 978-3-89438-726-6
