= Professional Air Traffic Controllers Organization (2003) =

U.S. labor union which represents air traffic controllers

PATCO
- Professional Air Traffic Controllers Organization
- Founded: 1996
- Location: United States
- Key people: Ron Taylor, President/CEO (As of 2017)
- Website: www.patco81.com

Professional Air Traffic Controllers Organization, Inc. (PATCO) is a labor union in the United States. It is certified by the NLRB and currently represents air traffic controllers who work in FAA private sector air traffic control towers, and is actively organizing controllers nationwide. PATCO signed an Alliance Agreement with the Teamsters Airline Division on October 15, 2008. The union also includes hundreds of former controllers fired during the 1981 strike by the previous union of the same name.

== See also ==
- National Air Traffic Controllers Association
- Professional Air Traffic Controllers Organization (AFSCME)
