= Union wage premium =

The union wage premium refers to the degree to which wages for union members exceed those for otherwise similar non-unionized workers. Union wage premiums are one of the most researched and analyzed issues in labor economics. The modern scholarly consensus is that unions tend to be associated with higher wages, greater levels of benefits like health care and paid time off, and improved workplace protections.

== Dynamics ==
One of the characteristics of a union is to try to bargain and negotiate wages and hours. Unions also try to reduce or eliminate pay discrimination and low wages. The wage gap of non-union workers and unionized workers since the 1970s has varied between 21% and 32% in Canada.

This union premium wage gap can be interpreted as the adaptations to globalization, technological, and demographic changes. Another argument for this gap between union and non-union wages is the competition between the wages including a foreign competitor, different workplace improvements to enhance productivity, safety in the workplace, and other interests of the workers. Thus higher wages paid in the union sector makes it seem like there is a rationing of union jobs and that the average worker would rather work a union job than a non-union job.

Others attribute changes in this premium to changes in business cycles (for example should the unemployment rate go up, it would raise the premium or if the inflation rate were to increase then it should lower the premium). Deregulation also affects premiums by adding competitors that will probably lower the unions bargaining power but it could be argued that it also affects the wages of non-union workers as well. As well cause them to compete with local and foreign wages to keep workers in the jobs and not move to a better paying job. Similarly, import penetration would cause the union to insulate the wages for a period of time.

== Narrowing of the Union Wage Premium Gap ==
Although wages for workers in trade unions are higher than non-union workers, the gap decreased in the late 20th and early 21st Century. This gap decrease could be due to the diminishing ability for unions to get monopoly rents, hence the rents affected by technology, competition from overseas, and deregulation of different firms/workplaces.

Another study done on union wage premiums attributes this narrowing of this gap to labor markets strengthening with time. Thus this strengthening depends on the actual and expected inflation of the union workers who are covered by their cost of living adjustments.

== Impact of Union Wage Premiums ==
Union wage premiums show the direct benefits of being a member of a union. Although the union wage premiums have fallen for private sector, it has raised for the public sector in the U.S. Union wage premiums also usually raise the wages of low-skilled workers more than those of high-skilled workers. Thus these low skilled workers usually have less education, lower wages, and in lower paid jobs. This mainly is the result of unions historically representing the working and lower classes. Most economist and labor studies on union wage premiums estimate a difference of about 15%.

Another study reports a much smaller wage difference of 7.7% and 6.0% in workplaces with more than 100 workers. Some studies also argue that as a consequence of unions raising their wages especially if about the market rate wage, it can cause serious firm profitability and eventually jobs could be lost. In some instances union presence in the firm can be associated with 3 to 9 percentage lower net income on assets for the firm but the opposite effect occurs when union density or size is lower.

Lower-wage, middle-wage, blue-collar, and high school educated workers are also more likely than high-wage, white-collar, and college-educated workers to be represented by unions. This is mainly because they raise the wages of the bottom and middle of the wage distribution than that of the top. The explanation that is given for this sector is that it is receiving more than the white collar sector with wage premiums. As well as with larger wages these workers have more purchasing power and their household incomes also increase, thus this wage premium not only affects their budget line but also their household budget line. Another study also backs up the emphasis of importance of wage union premiums among pay structures, especially with the wages of the lowest paid having an effect on pay differentials among gender, ethnicities, health, and different types of occupations. Thus although unions have become smaller in size and participation among the different worker sectors throughout time, those that have survived are more apt and able to negotiate and demand a higher wage premium from their firms and businesses. Union wages also hold up better with increased international competition than those of non-union workers wages although this might mean less union employment in their sector.

There were also changes through time of the union wage premium among different groups in the labor market. The changes could be seen through gender, skill, and the private and public sector of the labor market. Through studies and figures it was shown that the wage premium was largest in the least skilled for both males and females. But for males there is a decline in wage premiums as their skill increases so the wage premium is negative for men with very high skilled jobs. The pattern for the public and private sector was extremely similar especially during the years of 1973 through 1993.

== Estimating the Union Wage Premium ==
The econometric model for the estimation:

$$\ln w_{it} = \beta_{t}^{\mathsf{T}} X_{it} + \sum_{j} \alpha_{jt} I_{ijt} + \sum_{j} \pi_{jt} I_{ijt} U_{it} + \epsilon_{it}$$

Thus where $w_{it}$ denotes equals weekly wage of the $i$, the individual in $t$ years, $X$ is a vector of control variables (education, experience, gender, marital status, part-time work, census divisions, and twelve occupations). $I_{ijt}$ is the indicator variable for industry $j$, $U_{it}$ is the indicator variable for union membership and $\epsilon$ is the residual. The $\pi_{jt}$ is the union wage premium in industry $j$ in year $t$.

== See also ==
- Union threat model
