= Robert Edmund Poli =

American labor union leader

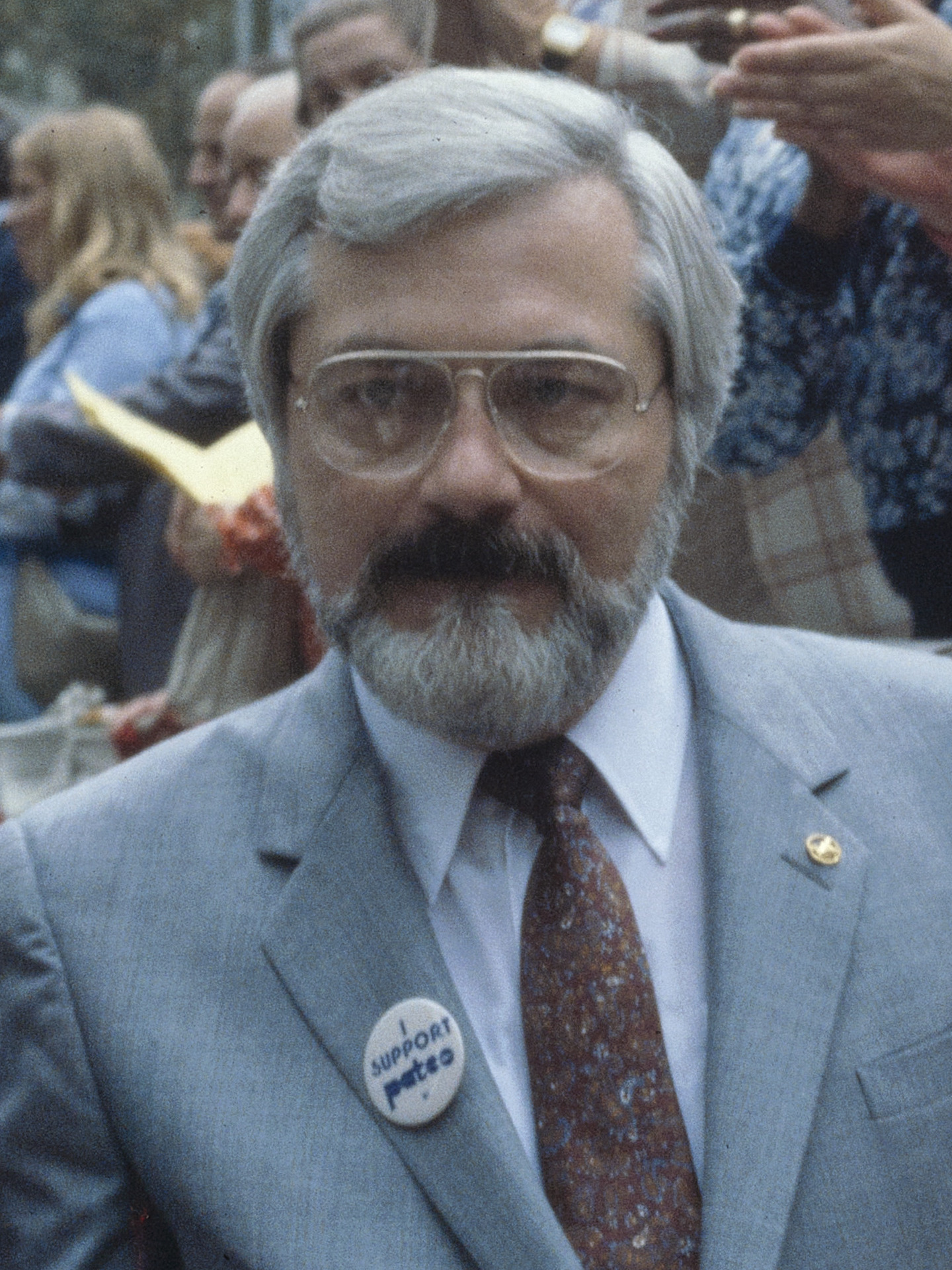
Poli in 1981

Robert Edmund Poli (February 27, 1936 – September 15, 2014) was an American labor union leader who was president of the Professional Air Traffic Controllers Organization (PATCO) during its unsuccessful strike in 1981 against the Federal Aviation Administration.

== Early life ==
Poli was born in Pittsburgh and grew up in a working-class home. His parents, Peter and Cora, owned a luncheonette, and his father carved religious statuary and worked at a dairy.

After high school, Poli served four years in the US Air Force, where he learned to be an air traffic controller. He began employment with the Federal Aviation Administration in the early 1960s.

== Career ==
For 13 years, Poli was an FAA air traffic controller, first at the control tower in Pittsburgh and then at an area control center in Cleveland, where he became a local Professional Air Traffic Controllers Organization union leader. He rose to vice president of the union in 1972 and to president in 1980.

In the 1960s and the 1970s, air traffic controllers became increasingly dissatisfied with their working conditions and salaries and staged a number of work slowdowns and "sickouts." As federal employees, they were prohibited by law from striking. By 1981, however, a strike seemed imminent. Poli reached an agreement with the government for higher salaries and better benefits, but the union membership voted to reject the pact even though Poli had called the terms fair. On August 3, 1981 about 12,000 of the 17,000 controllers went on strike.

US President Ronald Reagan gave the strikers an ultimatum to return to work within 48 hours or lose their jobs. On the day that the strike began, Poli declared his readiness to go to jail. "We are going to stay on strike as long as it takes," he said. Several local union leaders were briefly jailed for violating court orders but not Poli although he was fined. Almost none of the striking workers returned to work and as a result President Reagan fired them. The FAA filled vacant positions with supervisors, other staff and military controllers, but the drastic cut in the number of on-duty controllers caused a significant reduction in US air traffic. The federal government decertified the union, which went bankrupt. Poli resigned as PATCO president at end of 1981 and said that "the time is right."

== Later life ==
For the next two years, Poli remained out of public view. He wrote a book that was never published, according to his son. In his career after the FAA, Poli was a real estate salesman in Florida, general manager of a BMW auto dealership in Virginia, and briefly a labor negotiator for General Electric.

Poli was married three times and had two children from his first marriage. He died at age 78 of kidney failure at his home in Meridian, Idaho.
