= Martin J. Levitt =

American union buster

Martin J. Levitt (14 October 1944 – 21 November 2004) was an American supervisory trainer, union buster and a union organizer on and off over a 20-year period before 1987 when he reportedly changed direction. He went from anti union to anti management and founded Justice for Labor Foundation and later wrote about his career in his autobiography released in 1993 entitled Confessions of a Union Buster which he authored with Terry Conrow Toczynski. The book found success among labor unions due to the lurid details he outlined about union busting tactics he claims to have used. Levitt says he entered the field in 1969 "as a young man with no particular feelings about unions but with a desire to use his considerable wits and smooth tongue to get ahead." Levitt stated that he was "one of the multimillion-dollar industry's best talents...caught up in the money and intellectual pleasure of the pursuit." During his later career he was known for holding seminars, newspaper articles and some national television interviews such as on 60 minutes and the TODAY show.

In the book, Levitt details his work history from an inexperienced consultant first hired by a former IBEW union organizer named John Sheridan who had earned his stripes as a disciple of Nathan Shefferman who wrote a guide to union busting. Levitt recalled during his interview that Sheridan's 2nd in command Nick Sangalis did a background check and found "one" criminal skeleton in his closet: a conviction for receiving stolen property which, as detailed in his book, would become one of a long list of criminal convictions along with chronic alcoholism and mental illness for which the latter was diagnosed in 1977. His consulting career was atypical and went through upheavals until it culminated in what he terms was his "awakening" in 1987 when he called the AFL-CIO offices in Washington DC and spoke to the publisher of the RUB sheet (Report on Union Busters) saying "they had one less union buster to worry about". and soon thereafter he became an authority on union busting. His critics argue that he was an opportunist who found one more way to exploit labor unions.

== Changing Sides ==
In his book, Levitt argues that "My awakening came in late 1987. I was making $200,000 a year and living on a five-acre wooded estate in an exclusive community. I traveled, dined and lodged first class, and drove only the finest luxury cars. By then I had directed more than 200 anti-union campaigns--and lost only five--and had trained craven managers to go and do likewise at their own companies. I was at the top of my field, one of the best and one of the richest. No, I was not driven from the field by need. I was driven by horror and remorse".

== Criticism ==
AFL-CIO Western Regional Director David Sickler said, "He strikes me as a cheesy hustler. He made a living fighting us and now he wants to make a living showing us how bad he was to us. He's never been big on morality."

Levitt's detractors have viewed him as an opportunist. Some say his claims were untrue. Per Levitt: "When Nick Sangalis, Sheridan's second in command ratified my hiring, he commented 'the kid from Cleveland was the best damned bullshit artist I've ever met'".

The Culinary Union blocked the AFL-CIO's efforts to have Martin Levitt write a "bust the union busters" brochure and a training film for organizers due to their mistrust from an experience with him years previous as an organizer in 1975. It started with his firing from 3M (Modern Management Methods) for failure to pay back a corporate loan of $5000. Simultaneously with that firing he took a job with World Airways as a supervisory trainer but was fired after a few months for conduct unbecoming which made him seek work. He began "counter organizing" on his own at Rusty Scupper where he met Chuck Irvine, the president and chief organizer of Hotel Employees and Restaurant Employees Union and Bartenders International Union Local 28 who asked him to join them as an organizer. As he'd done in the past with other employers, he managed to get a $5000 loan (from the union) but was soon outed as a double agent and found himself unemployable by both sides, in bankruptcy again and seeking work.

Barbara Noble, a New York Times writer, asked in her article if Levitt was just a bad apple or was he representative of people in his field. She said, "He seems to take a compromise view that his more unfortunate personal proclivities – greased by scotch and vodka – allowed him to avoid his conscience". In one breath he claims his book is an act of contrition for victims of his union campaigns but makes no visible apology to the victime of his forgeries and fraudulent check scams. which got him in far more trouble than any dirty trick he ever played on a union.

Jack Sheridan, Levitt's first labor employer said, “Over the years I've trained about 155 people. There were maybe two I wish I'd never met. One was Levitt. I think of the movie 'Elmer Gantry,' where the guy is screwing everybody yet still convinced them he believed in God. I don't think Marty knows what the hell the truth is."
