= Cross-border leasing =

Cross-border leasing is a leasing arrangement where lessor and lessee are situated in different countries. This presents significant additional issues related to tax avoidance and tax shelters.

Cross-border leasing has been widely used in some European countries, to arbitrage the difference in the tax laws of different jurisdictions, usually between a European country and the United States. Typically, this rests on the fact that, for tax purposes, some jurisdictions assign ownership and the attendant depreciation allowances to the entity that has legal title to an asset, while others (like the U.S.) assign it to the entity that has the most indicia of tax ownership (legal title being only one of several factors taken into account). In these cases, with sufficiently long leases (often 99 years), an asset can end up with two effective owners, one in each jurisdiction; this is often referred to as a double-dip lease

Often the original owner of an asset is not subject to taxation in any jurisdiction, and therefore not able to claim depreciation. The transaction often involves a city selling an asset (such as a sewerage system or power plant) to an investor (who can claim depreciation), and long-term leasing it right back (often referred to as a sale leaseback). However, since 2004 cross border leasing has been effectively eliminated by the passage of the American Jobs Creation Act of 2004, which made the vast majority of cross border leases unprofitable.

== History ==
Leasing techniques have been used for financing purposes for several decades in the United States. The practice developed as a method of financing aircraft. Several airlines in the early 1970s were notoriously unprofitable and very capital intensive. These airlines had no need for the depreciation deductions generated by their aircraft and were significantly more interested in reducing their operating expenses. A very prominent bank would purchase aircraft and lease them to the airlines. Because the bank was able to claim depreciation deductions for the aircraft, the bank was able to offer lease rates significantly lower than the interest payments that airlines would otherwise pay on an aircraft purchase loan (and most commercial aircraft flying today are operated under a lease). In the United States, this spread into leasing the assets of U.S. cities and governmental entities and eventually evolved into cross-border leasing.

One significant evolution of the leasing industry involved the collateralization of lease obligations in sale leaseback transactions. For example, a city would sell an asset to a bank. The bank would require lease payments and give the city an option to repurchase the asset. The lease obligations were low enough (due to the depreciation deductions the banks were now claiming) that the city could pay for the lease obligations and fund the repurchase of the asset by depositing most but not all of the sale proceeds in an interest-bearing account. This resulted in the city having pre-funded all of its lease obligations as well as its option to repurchase the asset from the bank for less than the amount received in the initial sale of the asset, in which case the city would be left with additional cash after having pre-funded all of its lease obligations.

This gave the appearance of cities entering into leasing transactions with banks for a fee. By the late 1990s many of the leasing transactions were with cities in Europe, and in 1999 cross border leasing in the United States was "chilled" by the effective shutdown of LILOs (lease-in/lease outs). (LILOs were significantly more complicated than the typical lease where a municipality (for example) would lease an asset to a bank and then lease it back from the bank for a shorter period of time; LILOs relied on arcane rules of tax accounting to yield significant returns and are currently on a list of transaction types that the U.S. tax authority considers abusive.) Since 2004 cross border leasing has been effectively eliminated by the passage of the JOBS ACT of 2004, which made the vast majority of cross border leases unprofitable for the parties to the leasing transaction.
