= Salting (union organizing) =

Labor union tactic

Salting is a labor union tactic involving the act of getting a job at a specific workplace with the intent of organizing a union. The person employed is called a "salt".

The tactic is often discussed in the United States because under US law, unions may be prohibited from talking with workers in the workplace, so salting is one of the few legal strategies that allow union organizers to talk with workers. Both the Knights of Labor and the Industrial Workers of the World employed salts.

In Toering Elec. Co., 351 N.L.R.B. No. 18 (Sept. 29, 2007), the National Labor Relations Board (NLRB) concluded that workers in the United States can be fired if they are believed to not be "genuinely interested" in obtaining the job. This category includes salting. In a 2018 ruling, the Eighth Circuit Court of Appeals set out when the NLRB can find an employer violated the law by not hiring a salt. Among other criteria, the court held that "anti-union animus" should not play a role in the decision to hire or not.
