= Professional Air Traffic Controllers Organization (1968) =

American labor union (1968–1981)

PATCO
- Professional Air Traffic Controllers Organization
- Founded: 1968
- Dissolved: 1981
- Location: United States
- Members: 13,000

The Professional Air Traffic Controllers Organization (PATCO) was a United States trade union of air traffic controllers that operated from 1968 until its decertification in 1981 following an illegal labor strike broken by the Reagan administration. In striking, the union violated 5 U.S.C. (Supp. III 1956) 118p (now 5 U.S.C. § 7311), which prohibits strikes by federal government employees.

== Beginnings ==
Year	Presidents of PATCO
1969–1970	James E. Hays
1970–1980	John F. Leyden
1980–1982	Robert E. Poli
1982	Gary W. Eads

PATCO was founded in 1968 with the assistance of attorney and pilot F. Lee Bailey. On July 3, 1968, PATCO announced "Operation Air Safety" in which all members were ordered to adhere strictly to the established separation standards for aircraft. The resultant large delay of air traffic was the first of many official and unofficial "slowdowns" that PATCO would initiate.

In 1969, the U.S. Civil Service Commission ruled that PATCO was no longer a professional association but in fact a trade union. On June 18–20, 1969, 477 controllers conducted a three-day sick-out.

On March 25, 1970, the newly designated union orchestrated a controller "sickout" to protest many of the FAA actions that they felt were unfair; over 2,000 controllers around the country did not report to work as scheduled and informed management that they were ill. Controllers called in sick to circumvent the federal law against strikes by government unions. Management personnel attempted to assume many of the duties of the missing controllers but major traffic delays around the country occurred. On April 16, the federal courts intervened and most controllers went back to work by order of the court, but the government was forced to the bargaining table. The sickout led officials to recognize that the ATC system was operating nearly at capacity. To alleviate some of this, Congress accelerated the installation of automated systems, reopened the air traffic controller training academy in Oklahoma City, began hiring air traffic controllers at an increasing rate, and raised salaries to help attract and retain controllers.

In the 1980 presidential election, PATCO (along with the Teamsters and the Air Line Pilots Association) refused to back President Jimmy Carter, instead endorsing Republican Party candidate Ronald Reagan. PATCO's refusal to endorse the Democratic Party stemmed in large part from poor labor relations with the FAA (the employer of PATCO members) under the Carter administration and Ronald Reagan's endorsement of the union and its struggle for better conditions during the 1980 election campaign.

During his campaign, Reagan sent a letter to Robert E. Poli, the new president of PATCO, in which he declared support for the organization's demands and a disposition to work toward solutions. In it, he stated "I will take whatever steps are necessary to provide our air traffic controllers with the most modern equipment available, and to adjust staff levels and workdays so they are commensurate with achieving the maximum degree of public safety," and "I pledge to you that my administration will work very closely with you to bring about a spirit of cooperation between the President and the air traffic controllers." This letter gave Poli and the organization a sense of security that led to an overestimation of their position in the negotiations with the FAA, which contributed to their decision to strike.

== August 1981 strike ==
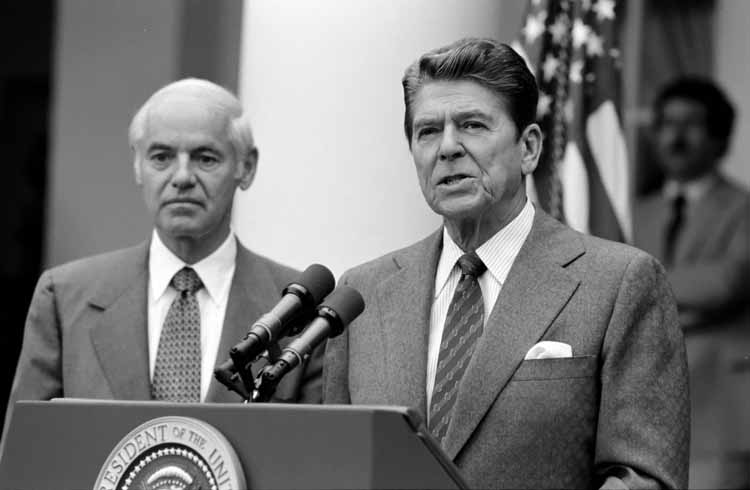
On August 3, 1981, during a press conference regarding the PATCO strike, President Reagan stated: "They are in violation of the law and if they do not report for work within 48 hours they have forfeited their jobs and will be terminated."

In February 1981, PATCO and the FAA began new contract negotiations. Citing safety concerns, PATCO called for a reduced 32-hour work week, a $10,000 pay increase for all air-traffic controllers and a better benefits package for retirement. Negotiations quickly stalled. Then, in June, the FAA offered a new three-year contract with $105 million of up front conversions in raises to be paid in 11.4% increases over the next three years, a raise more than twice what was being given to other federal employees, "The average federal controller (at a GS-13 level, a common grade controller) earned $36,613, which was 18% less than private sector counterpart"; with the raise demanded, the average federal pay would have exceeded the private sector pay by 8%, along with better benefits and shorter working hours. However, because the offer did not include a shorter work week or earlier retirement, PATCO rejected the offer.

At 7 a.m. on August 3, 1981, the union declared a strike, seeking better working conditions, better pay (PATCO sought a total raise of $600 million over three years, compared to FAA's offer of $105 million) and a 32-hour workweek (a four-day week and an eight-hour day combined). In addition, PATCO wanted to be excluded from the civil service clauses that it had long disliked. In striking, the union violated 5 U.S.C. (Supp. III 1956) 118p (now 5 U.S.C. § 7311), which prohibits strikes by federal government employees. Anthony Skirlick of the Los Angeles Center warned that these "Unrealistic demands in the face of this change is suicide". Despite supporting PATCO's effort in his 1980 campaign, Ronald Reagan declared the PATCO strike a "peril to national safety" and ordered them back to work under the terms of the Taft–Hartley Act. Only 1,300 (10%) of the nearly 13,000 controllers returned to work. At 10:55 a.m., Reagan included the following in a statement: "Let me read the solemn oath taken by each of these employees, a sworn affidavit, when they accepted their jobs: 'I am not participating in any strike against the Government of the United States or any agency thereof, and I will not so participate while an employee of the Government of the United States or any agency thereof.'" He then demanded those remaining on strike return to work within 48 hours or officially forfeit their positions.

After PATCO disobeyed a federal court injunction ordering an end to the strike and return to work, a federal judge found union leaders including PATCO President Robert Poli to be in contempt of court, and the union was ordered to pay a $100,000 fine, and certain named members were ordered to pay a $1,000 fine for each day its members were on strike. At the same time, Transportation Secretary Drew Lewis organized for replacements and started contingency plans. By prioritizing and cutting flights severely (about 7,000), and even adopting methods of air traffic management that PATCO had previously lobbied for, the government was initially able to have 50% of flights available.

On August 5, following the PATCO workers' refusal to return to work, the Reagan administration fired the 11,345 striking air traffic controllers who had ignored the order, and banned them from federal service for life. In the wake of the strike and mass firings, the FAA was faced with the difficult task of hiring and training enough controllers to replace those who had been fired. Under normal conditions, it took three years to train new controllers. Until replacements could be trained, the vacant positions were temporarily filled with a mix of non-participating controllers, supervisors, staff personnel, some non-rated personnel, military controllers, and controllers transferred temporarily from other facilities. PATCO was decertified by the Federal Labor Relations Authority on October 22, 1981. The decision was appealed but to no avail, and attempts to use the courts to reverse the firings proved fruitless.

The FAA had initially claimed that staffing levels would be restored within two years; however, it took closer to 10 years before the overall staffing levels returned to normal.

Some former striking controllers were allowed to reapply after 1986 and were rehired; they and their replacements are now represented by the National Air Traffic Controllers Association, which was certified on June 19, 1987, and had no connection with PATCO. The civil service ban on the remaining strike participants was lifted by President Bill Clinton on August 12, 1993. Nevertheless, by 2006 only 850 PATCO strikers had been rehired by the FAA.

== Legacy ==
Reagan's firing of the government employees encouraged large private employers like Phelps Dodge (1983), Hormel (1985–86), and International Paper (1987) to hire striker replacements instead of negotiating in labor conflicts. In 1970 there were over 380 major strikes or lockouts in the U.S.; by 1980 the number had dropped to under 200, in 1999 it fell to 17, and in 2010 there were only 11.

In 2003, Federal Reserve Chairman Alan Greenspan, speaking on the legacy of Ronald Reagan, noted:

Perhaps the most important, and then highly controversial, domestic initiative was the firing of the air traffic controllers in August 1981. The President invoked the law that striking government employees forfeit their jobs, an action that unsettled those who cynically believed no President would ever uphold that law. President Reagan prevailed, but far more importantly his action gave weight to the legal right of private employers, previously not fully exercised, to use their own discretion to both hire and discharge workers.

Reagan's director of the United States Office of Personnel Management at the time, Donald J. Devine, argued:

When the president said no, American business leaders were given a lesson in managerial leadership that they could not and did not ignore. Many private sector executives have told me that they were able to cut the fat from their organizations and adopt more competitive work practices because of what the government did in those days. I would not be surprised if these unseen effects of this private sector shakeout under the inspiration of the president were as profound in influencing the recovery that occurred as the formal economic and fiscal programs.

In a review of Joseph McCartin's 2011 book, Collision Course: Ronald Reagan, The Air Traffic Controllers, and the Strike that Changed America in Review 31, Richard Sharpe stated that Reagan was "laying down a marker" for his presidency: "The strikers were often working-class men and women who had achieved suburban middle class lives as air traffic controllers without having gone to college. Many were veterans of the US armed forces where they had learned their skills; their union had backed Reagan in his election campaign. Nevertheless, Reagan refused to back down. Several strikers were jailed; the union was fined and eventually made bankrupt. Only about 800 got their jobs back when Clinton lifted the ban on rehiring those who went on strike. Many of the strikers were forced into poverty as a result of being blacklisted for [U.S. government] employment."

Paul Volcker called the strike a "watershed" moment in the fight against inflation:

One of the major factors in turning the tide on the inflationary situation was the controllers' strike, because here, for the first time, it wasn't really a fight about wages; it was a fight about working conditions. It was directly a wage problem, but the controllers were government employees, and the government didn't back down. And he stood there and said, "If you're going to go on strike, you're going to lose your job, and we'll make out without you." That had a profound effect on the aggressiveness of labor at that time, in the midst of this inflationary problem and other economic problems. I am told that the administration pretty much took off the shelf plans that had been developed in the Carter administration, but whether the Carter administration ever would [have] done it is the open question. That was something of a watershed.

== Other ATC organizations ==
In addition to the National Air Traffic Controllers Association, two organizations now claim the name and part or all of the jurisdiction of the original PATCO: Professional Air Traffic Controllers Organization (AFSCME) and Professional Air Traffic Controllers Organization.

== See also ==
- Labor history of the United States#Reagan era, 1980s
