= Professional Air Traffic Controllers Organization (AFSCME) =

PATCO/AFSCME
- Professional Air Traffic Controllers Organization
- Headquarters: Tallahassee, Florida
- Location: United States
- Key people: Jack Seddon, Director
- Parent organization: American Federation of State, County and Municipal Employees
- Affiliations: AFL–CIO

Professional Air Traffic Controllers Organization (PATCO/AFSCME) is a United States labor union which represents air traffic controllers at a number of locations.

PATCO/AFSCME is a division of the Federation of Physicians & Dentists–Alliance of Healthcare and Professional Employees, an affiliate of the American Federation of State, County and Municipal Employees (AFSCME).
