= Anti-union violence in the United States =

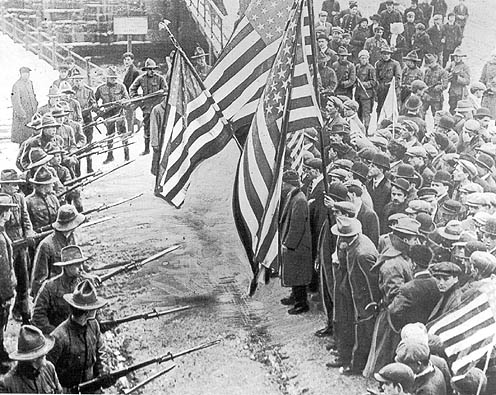
Massachusetts militiamen with fixed bayonets surround a group of strikers during the Lawrence, Massachusetts Textile Strike of 1912

Anti-union violence in the United States entails physical harm done to trade union officials, organizers, members, sympathizers, or their families, in the United States. It has most commonly been used either during union organizing efforts, or during strikes. The aim most often is to prevent a union from forming, to destroy an existing union, or to reduce the effectiveness of a union or a particular strike action. If strikers prevent people or goods from entering or leaving a workplace, violence may be used to allow people and goods to pass the picket line.

Violence against unions may be isolated, or may occur as part of a campaign that includes spying, intimidation, impersonation, disinformation, and sabotage. Violence in labor disputes may be the result of unreasonable polarization, or miscalculation. It may be willful and provoked, or senseless and tragic. On some occasions, violence in labor disputes may be purposeful and calculated, for example the hiring and deployment of goon squads to intimidate, threaten or even assault strikers.

According to labor historians and other scholars, the US has had the bloodiest and most violent labor history of any industrialized nation.

== History ==
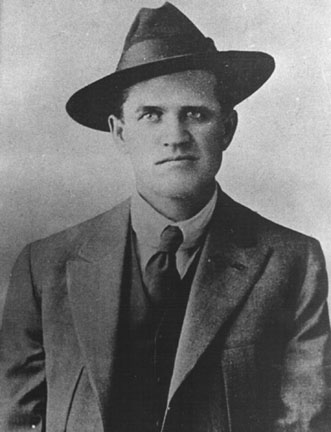
Union organizer Frank Little was pulled from his bed and lynched in 1917 because of his union activities.

Historically, violence against unions has included attacks by detective and guard agencies, such as the Pinkertons, Baldwin Felts, Burns, or Thiel detective agencies; citizens groups, such as the Citizens' Alliance; company guards; police; national guard; or even the military. In particular, there are few curbs on what detective agencies are able to get away with. In the book From Blackjacks To Briefcases, Robert Michael Smith states that during the late nineteenth and early twentieth centuries, anti-union agencies spawned violence and wreaked havoc on the labor movement. One investigator who participated in a congressional inquiry into industrial violence in 1916 concluded that,

Espionage is closely related to violence. Sometimes it is the direct cause of violence, and, where that cannot be charged, it is often the indirect cause. If the secret agents of employers, working as members of the labor unions, do not always investigate acts of violence, they frequently encourage them. If they did not, they would not be performing the duties for which they are paid, for they are hired on the theory that labor organizations are criminal in character.

In U.S. Senate testimony in 1936 about an employer who wanted to contract with the Pinkerton agency, known personally to the author of the book The Pinkerton Story, this employer was characterized as a "sincerely upright and Godly man." Yet Pinkerton files record that the employer wanted the agency "to send in some thugs who could beat up the strikers." In 1936, the Pinkerton agency changed its focus from strike-breaking to undercover services. Pinkerton declined the request from this employer.

According to Morris Friedman, detective agencies were themselves for-profit companies, and a "bitter struggle" between capital and labor could be counted upon to create "satisfaction and immense profit" for agencies such as the Pinkerton company. Such agencies were in the perfect position to fan suspicion and mistrust "into flames of blind and furious hatred" on the part of the companies.

=== Cell tactics used by agencies including the use of violence ===
Harry Wellington Laidler wrote a book in 1913 in which he detailed how one of the largest union busters in the United States, Corporations Auxiliary Company, espoused a sales pitch in which it offered the use of provocation and violence. The agency would routinely tell employers—prospective clients—about the methods which were used by its undercover operatives,

Once the union is in the field its members can keep it from growing if they know how, and our man knows how. Meetings can be set far apart. A contract can at once be entered into with the employer, covering a long period, and made very easy in its terms. However, these tactics may not be good, and the union spirit may be so strong that a big organization cannot be prevented. In this case our man turns extremely radical. He asks for unreasonable things and keeps the union embroiled in trouble. If a strike comes, he will be the loudest man in the bunch, and will counsel violence and get somebody in trouble. The result will be that the union will be broken up.

=== Different types of violence ===
Striking Pennsylvania mine workers began their protest march near Harwood. Many would soon be killed by the Luzerne County sheriff.

Some anti-union violence appears to be random, such as an incident during the 1912 textile strike in Lawrence, Massachusetts, in which a police officer fired into a crowd of strikers, killing Anna LoPizzo.

Anti-union violence may be used as a means to intimidate others, as in the hanging of union organizer Frank Little from a railroad trestle in Butte, Montana. A note was pinned to his body which said, "Others Take Notice! First And Last Warning!". The initial of the last names of seven well-known union activists in the Butte area were on the note, with the "L" for Frank Little circled.

Anti-union violence may be abrupt and unanticipated. Three years after Frank Little was lynched, a strike by Butte miners was suppressed with gunfire when deputized mine guards suddenly fired upon unarmed picketers in the Anaconda Road Massacre. Seventeen were shot in the back as they tried to flee, and one man died.

Machine gun equipped armored car built with steel from CF&I's Pueblo steel works, known to the striking miners as the Death Special. "The machine gun was turned on striking miners and used to riddle the Forbes tent colony."

The unprovoked attack was similar to another event, which had occurred twenty-three years earlier in Pennsylvania. During the Lattimer massacre, nineteen unarmed immigrant coal miners were suddenly gunned down at the Lattimer mine near Hazleton, Pennsylvania, on September 10, 1897. The miners, mostly of Polish, Slovak, Lithuanian and German ethnicity, were shot and killed by a Luzerne County sheriff's posse. In this group as well, all of the miners had been shot in the back. The shooting followed a brief tussle over the American flag carried by the miners. Their only crime was asserting their right to march in the face of demands that they disperse.

In 1927, during a coal strike in Colorado, state police and mine guards fired pistols, rifles and a machine gun into a group of five hundred striking miners and their wives in what came to be called the Columbine Mine Massacre. In this incident as well, many of the miners were immigrants, and there had been a disagreement over the question of trespassing onto company property in the town of Serene, with the miners asserting it was public property because of the post office. There was, once again, a tussle over American flags carried by the strikers.

While the Columbine mine shooting was a surprise, newspapers played a deadly role in conjuring the atmosphere of hate in which the violence occurred. Lurid editorials attacked the ethnicity of the strikers. Newspapers began calling for the governor to no longer withhold the "mailed fist", to strike hard and strike swiftly, and for "Machine Guns Manned By Willing Shooters" at more of the state's coal mines. Within days of these editorials, state police and mine guards fired on the miners and their wives, injuring dozens and killing six.

In all of the above incidents, the perpetrators were never caught, or went unpunished. An exception resulted from a shooting of strikers at the Williams & Clark Fertilizing Company near the Liebig Fertilizer Works at Carteret, New Jersey, in 1915. One striker was killed outright, and more than twenty were injured in an unprovoked attack when deputies fired on strikers who had stopped a train to check for strikebreakers. The strikers found no strikebreakers and were cheering as they exited the train. Forty deputies approached and suddenly fired on them with revolvers, rifles, and shotguns. As the strikers ran, "the deputies ... pursued, firing again and again." According to attending physicians, all the strikers' wounds were on the backs or legs, indicating the guards were pursuing them. A local government official who witnessed the shooting called it entirely unprovoked. Four more of the strikers, all critically injured, would die. Twenty-two of the guards were arrested and the crime was investigated by a Grand Jury; nine deputies were subsequently convicted of manslaughter.

Other anti-union violence may seem orchestrated, as in 1914 when mine guards and the state militia fired into a tent colony of striking miners in Colorado, an incident that came to be known as the Ludlow Massacre. During that strike, the company hired the Baldwin Felts agency, which built an armored car so their agents could approach the strikers' tent colonies with impunity. The strikers called it the "Death Special". At the Forbes tent colony,

[The Death Special] opened fire, a protracted spurt that sent some six hundred bullets tearing through the thin tents. One of the shots struck miner Luka Vahernik, fifty, in the head, killing him instantly. Another striker, Marco Zamboni, eighteen ... suffered nine bullet wounds to his legs... One tent was later found to have about 150 bullet holes...

After deaths of women and children at Ludlow,

[T]he backlash was vicious and bloody. Over the next ten days striking miners poured out their rage in attacks across the coalfields...

The U.S. Army was called upon to put an end to the violence, and the strike sputtered to an end that December.

As a result of Operative Smith's "clever and intelligent" work, a number of union organizers received severe beatings at the hands of unknown masked men, presumably in the employ of the company.

Morris Friedman offers examples of these incidents:

About February 13, 1904, William Farley, of Alabama, a member of the [UMWA] National Executive Board ... and the personal representative of [UMWA] President Mitchell ... addressed coal miners' meetings ... [on their return trip] eight masked men held them up with revolvers, dragged them from their wagon, threw them to the ground, beat them, kicked them, and almost knocked them into insensibility.

And,

On Saturday, April 30, 1904, W.M. Wardjon, a national organizer of the United Mine Workers, while on board a train en route to Pueblo, was assaulted by three men at Sargents, about thirty miles west of Salida. Mr. Wardjon was beaten into unconsciousness.

Friedman accused the Colorado Fuel and Iron Company (CF&I), operated by John D. Rockefeller and his lieutenant in Colorado, Jesse Welborn, of responsibility for the beatings during the 1903–04 strike.

Sometimes, there is simultaneous violence on both sides. In an auto workers strike organised by Victor Reuther and others in 1937, "[u]nionists assembled rocks, steel hinges, and other objects to throw at the cops, and police organized tear gas attacks and mounted charges."

=== Colorado labor war, 1903–1904 ===
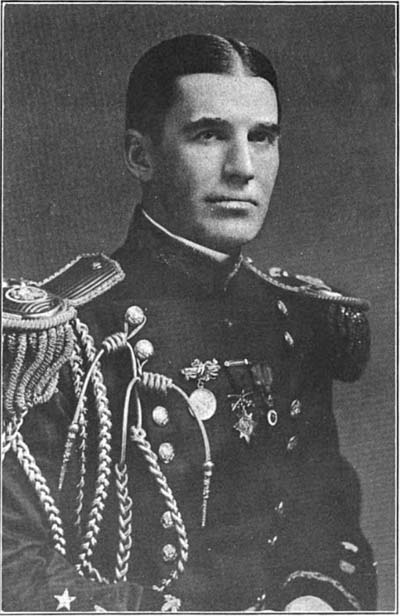
General Sherman Bell. Photo from The Pinkerton Labor Spy, published in 1907.

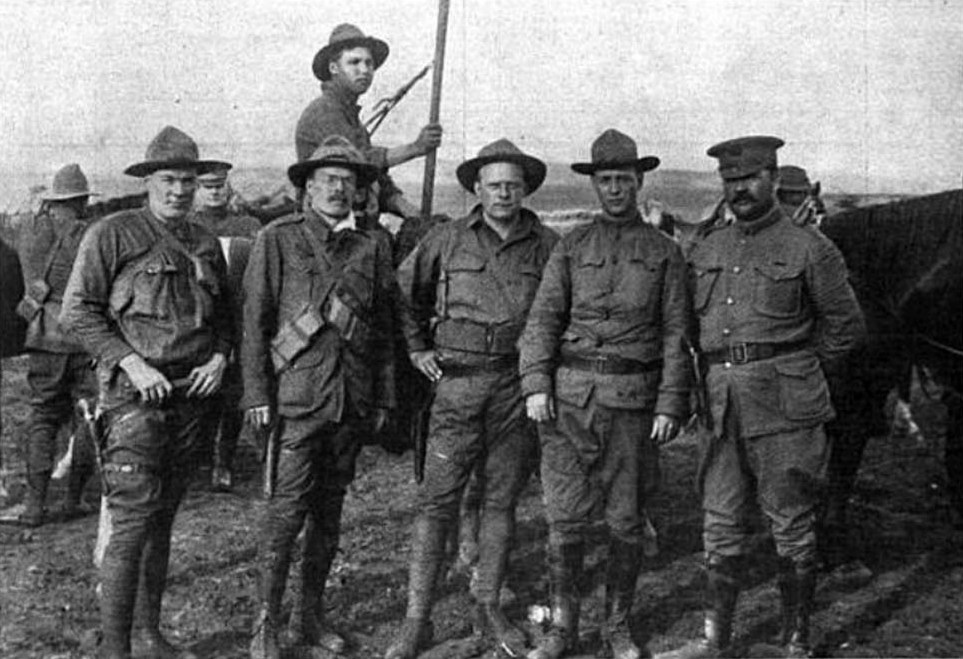
Karl Linderfelt, center. Original photo caption: "OFFICERS OF THE COLORADO NATIONAL GUARD From left to right: Captain R. J. Linderfelt, Lieut. T. C. Linderfelt, Lieut. K. E. Linderfelt, (who faced the charge of assault upon Louis Tikas, the dead strike leader), Lieut. G.S. Lawrence and Major Patrick Hamrock. The last three were in the Ludlow battle of April 20, 1914."

A study of industrial violence in 1969 concluded, "There is no episode in American labor history in which violence was as systematically used by employers as in the Colorado labor war of 1903 and 1904."

About the middle of February 1904, leadership of the Colorado National Guard became concerned that the Mine Owners were failing to cover the payroll of the soldiers. General Reardon ordered Major Ellison to take another soldier he could trust to "hold up or shoot the men coming off shift at the Vindicator mine" in order to convince the mine owners to pay. The implication of the secrecy was that the incident would then be blamed on the union.

However, Major Ellison reported that the miners took a route out of the mine that would not make ambush possible. Reardon ordered Ellison to pursue an alternative plan, which was shooting up one of the mines. Major Ellison and Sergeant Gordon Walter fired sixty shots into two mine buildings. The plan worked, and the mine owners paid up. Ellison would later testify (in October 1904) that General Reardon informed him Adjutant General Sherman Bell and Colorado Governor James Peabody knew about the plan. Major Ellison's testimony about the shooting plot, and about the staged attacks on striking miners, was corroborated by two other soldiers.

=== Ludlow massacre, 1914 ===
Professor James H. Brewster, a faculty attorney with the University of Colorado who was investigating the strike for Governor Ammons, was aware that militia Lieutenant Karl Linderfelt was guilty of abuse and beatings of innocent citizens, including a small Greek boy "whose head was split open". Professor Brewster sent a telegram to Governor Ammons requesting Linderfelt's removal. No action was taken. In a subsequent face to face meeting with the governor, three months prior to the Ludlow Massacre, Brewster again insisted that Linderfelt be removed, but again, Ammons declined. In later testimony, Professor Brewster stated that Linderfelt was the reason for the massacre. On the day that the Ludlow Massacre occurred, Lieutenant Karl Linderfelt, commander of one of two companies of the Colorado National Guard, had Louis Tikas, leader of the Ludlow tent colony of striking miners, at gunpoint. Tikas was unarmed, and the miners would later explain that he approached the militia to ask them to stop shooting. While two militiamen held Tikas, Linderfelt broke a rifle butt over his head. Tikas and two other captured miners were later found shot dead. Tikas had been shot in the back. Their bodies lay along the Colorado and Southern railroad tracks for three days in full view of passing trains. The militia officers refused to allow them to be moved until a local of a railway union demanded the bodies be taken away for burial. A court martial found Lieutenant Linderfelt guilty of assaulting Tikas with a Springfield rifle, "but attaches no criminality thereto. And the court does therefor acquit him."

=== 1916 Congressional investigation ===
In 1916, the Commission on Industrial Relations, created by the U.S. Congress, issued a final report on its investigation of industrial unrest. On the question of violence in industrial disputes, the Commission stated, in part,

Many instances of the use of physical force by the agents of employers have ... come before the Commission, indicating a relatively wide use, particularly in isolated communities.

== Late 20th century anti-union violence ==
By the early 1900s, public tolerance for violence during labor disputes began to decrease. Yet violence involving strikebreaking troops and armed guards continued into the 1930s. The level of violence that anti-union agencies engaged in eventually resulted in their tactics becoming increasingly public, for there were a very great number of newspaper and muckraking articles written about such incidents. Resources that once were allocated to overt control over workforces began to be assigned to other methods of control, such as industrial espionage. After the Great Depression in 1929, the public no longer considered companies unassailable. Yet legislation related to employer strategies such as violent strike breaking would have to wait until after World War II. Beginning in the 1950s, employers began to embrace new methods of managing workers and unions which were still effective, but much more subtle.

A 1969 study of labor conflict violence in the United States examined the era following the 1947 passage of the Taft–Hartley Act and noted that attacks on strikers by company guards had all but disappeared. Violence still occurs in labor disputes, for example, when one side miscalculates. Bringing in outside security forces, as one example, can lead to violence in modern labor disputes.

The use of cameras and camcorders may affect levels of violence in labor disputes today.

=== Examples since 1940 ===
- Victor Reuther, a leader of the United Auto Workers in Detroit, survived an assassination attempt in 1949, with the loss of his right eye.

=== Threats ===
Sometimes, threats of violence cause damage to union members or supporters. Other times, threats against unions or their members may backfire. For example, Indiana Deputy Attorney General Jeffrey Cox was fired after suggesting that Wisconsin Governor Scott Walker should use live ammunition against pro-union protesters involved in the 2011 Wisconsin protests. More recently, a Deputy Prosecutor in Indiana's Johnson County, Carlos Lam, suggested that Governor Walker should mount a "false flag" operation which would make it appear as if the union was committing violence. After initially claiming that his email account was hacked, Lam admitted to sending the suggestion and resigned.

Cullen Werwie, press secretary for Governor Walker, states that Walker's office was unaware of Lam's email. According to CBS News, Werwie also commented, "Certainly we do not support the actions suggested in (the) email. Governor Walker has said time and again that the protesters have every right to have their voice heard, and for the most part the protests have been peaceful. We are hopeful that the tradition will continue."

== See also ==
- Labor spies
- Union violence
- Labor history of the United States
- List of worker deaths in United States labor disputes
- Sheep Wars
- Railroad Wars
- West Virginia Coal Wars
  - Battle of Blair Mountain
  - Battle of Matewan
- Illinois coal wars
- Colorado Labor Wars
- Harlan County War
- Mining in the United States
- Copper Country strike of 1913–1914
- Cripple Creek miners' strike of 1894
- Molly Maguires
- Coal strike of 1902
