= Mine Owners' Association =

In the United States, a Mine Owners' Association (MOA), also sometimes referred to as a Mine Operators' Association or a Mine Owners' Protective Association, is the combination of individual mining companies, or groups of mining companies, into an association, established for the purpose of promoting the collective interests of the group. Such associations are sometimes referred to as MOAs, however, in some cases they may be designated by the state, district, or locale, such as the Cripple Creek District Mine Owners' Association (CCDMOA).

Mine Owners' Associations were often formed for the purpose of fighting against union organizing drives, but smelter trusts and railroad syndicates were also a concern. These latter issues were complicated by the fact that some mine owners also controlled smelters and railroad lines.

== History ==
Prior to the formation of the Western Federation of Miners (WFM), local unions and protective associations formed by miners did not present much of a threat to the mine operators. Organizations such as the Knights of Labor had little power in confronting owners. Miners demanding better working conditions or wage increases were often fired. When local unions sought such changes, they were easily driven out of the mining districts.

During the 1896-97 strike of the Cloud City Miners' Union in Leadville, Colorado, mine owners formed a secret verbal agreement among themselves that none of them would recognize the union or negotiate with it, an arrangement later revealed in a report by the Colorado State Legislature.

Mine owners went a step further and formed a Mine Owners' Association in response to union organizing in the mining district of Coeur d'Alene, Idaho during the 1880s. A violent confrontation between local miners' organizations and mining companies in Coeur d'Alene in 1892 served as the impetus for formation of the Western Federation of Miners (WFM) in 1893. The mining companies of Colorado similarly joined together during a labor struggle with the WFM in 1894, and during the Colorado Labor Wars of 1903. However, the mining companies of the Cripple Creek District were not completely united, even during the 1903-04 strike. As in Coeur d'Alene, mining companies in the Cripple Creek District that made agreements with unions were shut down by military force.

In the late 1890s and 1900s, mine owners' associations were created in cities and states throughout the mining west.

=== Colorado mining associations ===
The Colorado Mining Association (CMA), had been established in 1876, and was incorporated in 1897, and still exists.

In March 1902, Arthur L. Collins, of the Smuggler-Union mine in Telluride; Charles Chase; Arthur Winslow, general manager of the Liberty Bell; A.D. Snodgrass, chief clerk of the Smuggler-Union mine; and several other mine operators were instrumental in forming the Colorado Mine Operators' Association. The motivating reason was a WFM union organizing drive in Telluride, and similar efforts in other parts of Colorado. Twenty-seven members started the group, many of them from Idaho Springs, where the WFM was strong.

Mining operators in the San Juan mountain area of Colorado formed the San Juan District Mining Association (SJDMA) in approximately 1903, as a direct result of a WFM proposal to the Telluride Mining Association for the eight-hour day. The new association consolidated the power of thirty-six mining properties in San Miguel, Ouray, and San Juan counties. The SJDMA granted itself the power to prevent any of its members from coming to an agreement with the miners' union that would accept reduced hours or increased wages. This inflexible decision helped to create conditions that resulted in a series of bitter and bloody strikes throughout Colorado's mining communities.

== Methods of dealing with unions ==
Mining companies routinely hired agencies such as the Pinkerton National Detective Agency, the Baldwin–Felts Detective Agency, or the Thiel Detective Service Company to assign special agents to monitor, infiltrate, and sabotage unions, or union organizing drives. The MOAs sometimes issued work cards to miners who were required to renounce the union as a condition of employment. State MOAs enabled blacklisting of union miners on a statewide basis. MOAs sometimes united to call upon state or federal authorities to send military force in the form of national guard or federal troops into strike areas.

== Historic mining associations by state ==
=== Colorado ===
- Cripple Creek District Mine Owners' Association
- Telluride Mining Association
- San Juan District Mining Association
- Colorado Mine Operators' Association

== Modern mining associations ==
In 1995, mining companies in the United States joined together to form the National Mining Association (NMA). The trade organization works through the Advocacy Campaign Team for Mining; lists itself as the voice of the mining industry in Washington, DC; and has more than 325 corporate members.

The Bituminous Coal Operators Association represents coal mining companies in negotiations with the United Mine Workers of America.

== See also ==
- Charlie Siringo
- Mining in the United States
