= The Neutral Thousands =

The Neutral Thousands (TNT)
- Founded: 1937
- Headquarters: United States
- Area served: United States

The Neutral Thousands, initialized as TNT, was an organization created in 1937 to target union activities and was known as an anti-union organization. The organization rose along with a tide of similar organizations in the period of the late-19th century to the mid-twentieth century. Bessie Ochs, formerly a speaker for the Merchants and Manufacturers Association, was recruited by Byron C. Hanna, the leader of The Southern Californians, Incorporated, to lead the organization. In addition to the general activities of the organization, it also broadcast a radio program, referred to as the "California Caravan".

The organization claimed to have over 100,000 members at its high point, according to membership logs by the leader, Bessie Ochs. However, In 1940, after an investigation by the La Follette Committee, the organization disbanded, along with other similar organization, such as the Southern Californians, Incorporated (or SCI).

== History ==
Founded in 1937, The Neutral Thousands was a group primarily targeting toward anti-union women. The organization was described as a "voluntary association of housewives concerned with labor racketeering and its effects on consumer prices". The group was promoted as an association created by local housewives that sought to attract women toward their cause. The slogan Truth Not Terror became associated with the group, which along with the group's name, prompted its initialism of TNT. The organization's leader, Bessie Ochs, was described as a woman who was "fiftyish, peroxide-blond and tough as nails."

While the organization represented itself as a spontaneous creation of local housewives, many argue that it was created by other anti-union organizations, such as the Merchants and Manufacturers Association. The organization stated it had recruited thousands of women, with membership rates of over 100,000, according to Bessie Ochs. In addition to its radio program, the California Caravan, the organization distributed a newsletter to its members, titled the Memo-News. Many supported and allied with the Neutral Thousands, including Japanese-American unions who stood in support of the anti-picketing ordinances, the Associated Farmers, the Southern Californians, Inc., Women of the Pacific and The Chamber of Commerce.

The radio broadcasts by the organization, the California Caravan, provided both entertainment and information about the anti-union movement that the organization supported. However, the program was shut down by the Federal Communications Commission, due to its one-sided and negative depiction of labor unions. The organization itself was later shut down amid similar concerns.

== Partnership with Japanese Unions ==
In 1937, the organization partnered with The Southern California Retail Produce Workers Union, a Japanese union led by Thomas Hiromo Yamate, who was a produce buyer. Yamate enlisted TNT to try to put economic pressure onto a leading produce seller, Three Star Produce. In turn, TNT asked Yamate to recruit SCRPWU members to sign a proposal to get anti-picketing initiatives on the ballot. Yamate ascertained the signatures, and while TNT attempted to get in contact with the president of Three Star Produce they were never able to reach him. The La Follette Hearings found that TNT was partnering with other Japanese unions in promotion of their campaign for anti-picketing measures.

== TNT and the La Follette Committee ==
After the La Follette Committee began investigating worker conditions in Los Angeles during 1939 and 1940, anti-union organizations, such as TNT, were soon targeted by the committee. The committee soon found that one of TNT's major partners, Southern Californians, Inc., designated as an educational organization, was run by corporate interests and only $9,000 of its $500,000 budget went toward educational pursuits. TNT was soon investigated, as well, and the Committee found that much of its membership numbers were falsified or were recruited using illegal practices. In addition, the investigations found that TNT was primarily financed by Southern Californians, Inc., and some of its employees, such as the Chairman, testified to destroying numerous documents after being subpoenaed by the La Follette Committee.

After the investigation of the La Follette Committee, charges were brought against TNT by the United States Department of Justice. Soon after, the organization was dissolved.

== Dissolution and the Employees Advisory Service ==
After the organization shutdown due to the charges brought by the Justice Department, many of its members formed together, along with members from other California-based anti-union organizations, to form the Employees Advisory Service in April 1939. In the case of NATIONAL LABOR RELATIONS BOARD v. SUN TENT-LUEBBERT CO. et al., it is stated that the aforementioned organization worked to carry on much of the work promoted by TNT. The organization was later sued for partnering with TNT to create an employer-dominated union, which violated the National Labor Relations Act.
