= 1892 Coeur d'Alene labor strike =

Labor strike in Coeur d'Alene, Idaho, U.S.

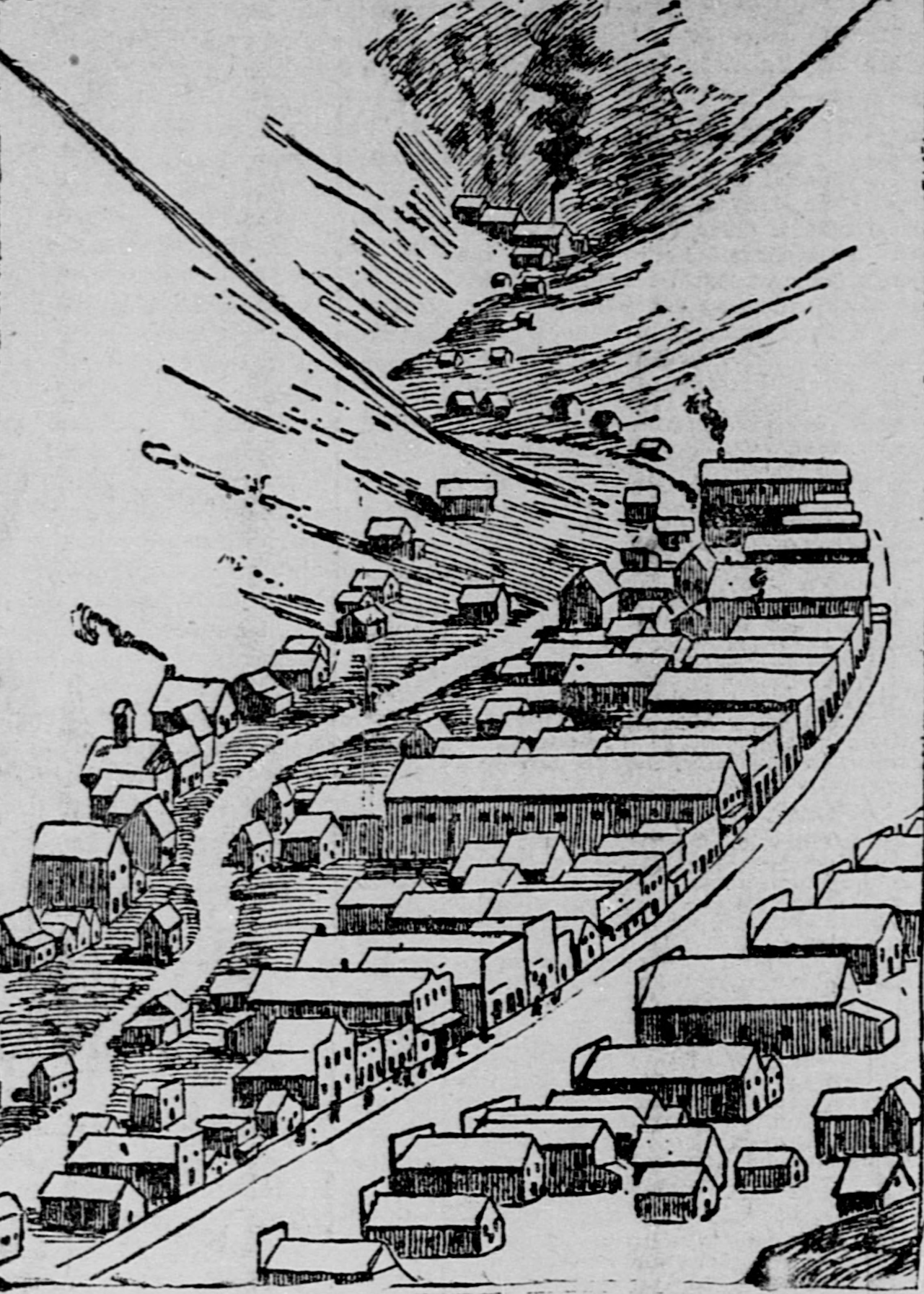
- The Bunker Hill mill (the building emitting smoke in the far distance) was blown up during the 1892 labor strike.
- Date: July 1892
- Location: Coeur d'Alene, Idaho, U.S.
- Goals: wages
- Methods: Strikes, Protest, Demonstrations

Parties
Western Federation of Miners	Mine Owners' Association; Pinkertons

Lead figures
George Pettibone	Charlie Siringo

Casualties and losses
Deaths: 3 Injuries: 17; Arrests: 600	Deaths: 2 Injuries:

The 1892 Coeur d'Alene labor strike erupted in violence when labor union miners discovered they had been infiltrated by a Pinkerton agent who had routinely provided union information to the mine owners. The response to the labor violence, disastrous for the local miners' union, became the primary motivation for the formation of the Western Federation of Miners (WFM) the following year. The incident marked the first violent confrontation between the workers of the mines and their owners. Labor unrest continued after the 1892 strike, and surfaced again in the labor confrontation of 1899.

== Background ==
Shoshone County, Idaho area miners organized into several local unions during the 1880s. Mine owners responded by forming a Mine Owners' Association. In 1891, the Coeur d'Alene district shipped ore containing US$4.9 million (~$154 million in 2024) in lead, silver, and gold.

The mine operators got into a dispute with the railroads which had raised rates for hauling ore. Mine operators also introduced hole-boring machines into the mines. The new machines displaced single-jack and double-jack miners, forcing the men into new, lower-paid jobs as trammers or muckers.

Mine operators found a reduction in wages the easiest way to mitigate increased costs. After the machines were installed, the mine owners were going to pay the mine workers $3.00 to $3.50 per day, depending upon their specific jobs.^{p. 12} The operators also increased miners' work hours from nine to ten hours per day, with no corresponding increase in pay. The work week would be seven days long, with an occasional Sunday off for those who did not have pumping duty. The miners had other grievances; for example, high payments for room and board in company lodging, and check cashing fees at company saloons.

== Strike ==
In 1892, the miners declared a strike against the reduction of wages and the increase in work hours. The miners demanded that a "living wage"^{p. 12} of $3.50 per day be paid to every man working underground—the common laborer as well as the skilled. In an era when many unions were AFL craft unions, in which skilled workers frequently looked after their own kind, this was an unusual circumstance—approximately three thousand higher-paid miners standing up for five hundred lower-paid, in this case common laborers. This principle of industrial unionism would animate Western hardrock miners for the next several decades.

When the union miners walked out of the mines, mining company recruiters enticed replacement workers to Coeur d'Alene during the strike. They advertised in Michigan, in some cases touting mining jobs in Montana, mentioning nothing about the strike. Guards were assigned to the trains that transported the men seeking work, and at least some of the workers felt they were in the "custody of the guards."

Soon every inbound train was filled with replacement workers. But groups of armed, striking miners would frequently meet them, and often threatened the workers to not take the jobs during a strike.

The silver-mine owners responded by hiring Pinkertons and the Thiel Detective Agency agents to infiltrate the union and report on strike activity. Pinkertons and other agents went into the district in large numbers.^{p. 12}

Soon there was a significant security force available to protect new workers coming into the mines. For a time the struggle manifested as a war of words in the local newspapers, with mine owners and mine workers denouncing each other. There were incidents of brawling and arrests for carrying weapons. Two mines settled and opened with union men, and these mine operators were ostracized by other mine owners who did not want the union. But two large mines, the Gem mine and the Frisco mine in Burke-Canyon, were operating full scale.

In July a union miner was killed by mine guards, and the tension between the strikers and the mine owners and their replacement workers grew. The incident marked the first violent confrontation between the workers of the mines and their owners.

=== Charles Siringo ===
An undercover Pinkerton agent, soon-to-be well-known lawman, Charlie Siringo, had worked in the Gem Mine as a shoveler. Using the alias Charles Leon Allison, Siringo joined the Gem Miners' Union, and was elected recording secretary, providing him with access to all of the union's books and records. Siringo found the "leaders of the Coeur d'Alene unions to be, as a rule, a vicious, heartless gang of anarchists."

According to Siringo, he had at first turned down the assignment, because his sympathies were with the union. The Pinkerton Agency agreed that he could withdraw from the assignment after he became familiar with the situation, yet Siringo stayed on to complete the one year and two month assignment. Siringo apologized for his work spying on Colorado coal miners, but he never regretted his informant role in the Coeur d'Alene."

Siringo promptly began to report all union business to his employers, allowing the mine owners to outmaneuver the miners on a number of occasions. Strikers planned to attack a train of incoming replacement workers, so the mine owners dropped them off in an unexpected location. When the Gem Union president, Oliver Hughes, ordered Siringo to remove a page from the union record book that recorded plans to flood the mines, the agent mailed that page to the Mine Owners' Association (MOA). George Pettibone also confided in Siringo of a planned July uprising to run the non-union workers and mine owners out of the country, and take possession of the mines for the union workers.

Siringo was suspected as a spy when the Mine Owners' Association newspaper, the Barbarian, published information which obviously came from a member of the union, but Siringo managed to escape capture and certain death. Siringo's testimony helped convict 18 union leaders, including George Pettibone.

=== Violence at the Frisco and Gem mines ===
On Sunday night, July 10, armed union miners gathered on the hills above the Frisco mine. More union miners were arriving from surrounding communities. Strikers opened fire at 5 am on July 11, 1892, and guards and workers in the mill building returned fire. The guards and strikebreakers inside the mine and mill buildings were prepared for a long standoff, having been warned by Charlie Siringo. Both sides began shooting to kill. After three and a half hours of gunfire without casualties, striking miners on the hill above sent a bundle of dynamite down a sluice into the mill, destroying the building and crushing one of the strikebreakers. The rest of the strikebreakers in the wrecked Frisco mill surrendered and were taken to the union hall as prisoners.

After the Helena-Frisco strikebreakers surrendered, the striking miners shifted to the Gem mine, where a similar gunfight took place. The Gem miners were well-entrenched, but the Gem management, fearing similar destruction of property as took place at the Frisco, ordered the men to surrender. Three union men, one company guard and one strikebreaker were killed by gunfire before the strikebreakers surrendered. At the end of the day, six men were dead, three on each side, and there were 150 strikebreakers and guards held prisoner in the union hall. They were put on a train and were told to leave the county.

Minutes after the explosion at the Frisco mine, hundreds of miners converged on Siringo's boarding house. But Siringo sawed a hole in the floor, dropped through and covered the hole with a trunk, then crawled for half a block under a wooden boardwalk. Above him, he could hear union men talking about the spy in their midst. Siringo escaped, and fled to the wooded hills above Burke-Canyon Creek.

On the evening of July 11, about 500 strikers left Gem by train to the Bunker Hill mine at Wardner. The Bunker Hill management was taken by surprise, and the strikers took possession of the ore mill during the night, and put a ton of explosive beneath it. The next morning they gave the manager the choice of discharging his non-union employees, or having his mill destroyed. He chose to get rid of the nonunion workforce. While these men waited to board a boat at Coeur d'Alene Lake, some striking miners fired again, and at least seventeen non-union workers were wounded. More than a hundred of the men decided not to wait for the boat, and they hiked out of the area.

The miners considered the battle over and the union issued a statement deploring "the unfortunate affair at Gem and Frisco." Funerals were Wednesday afternoon, July 13. Three union men and two company men were buried.

== Martial law ==
The governor declared Martial Law, and ordered in six companies of the Idaho National Guard to "suppress insurrection and violence." Federal troops also arrived, and they confined six hundred miners in bullpens without any hearings or formal charges. Some were later "sent up" for violating injunctions, others for obstructing the United States mail.^{p. 13}

After the Guard and federal troops secured the area, Siringo came out of the mountains to identify union leaders, and those who had participated in the attacks on the Gem and Frisco mines. He wrote that "As I knew all the agitators and union leaders, I was kept busy for the next week or so putting unruly cattle in the 'bull pen', a large stockade with a frame building in the center, for them to sleep and eat in." Siringo then returned to Denver.

Military rule lasted for four months.

One of the union leaders, George Pettibone, was convicted of contempt of court and criminal conspiracy. Pettibone was sent to Detroit and held until a decision of the Supreme Court released him. The Court concluded that the prisoners were held illegally. Union members held in jail in Boise, Idaho were also released^{p. 13} under the court decision.

=== Founding of the Western Federation of Miners ===
On May 15, 1893, in Butte, Montana, the miners formed the Western Federation of Miners (WFM) as a direct result of their experiences in Coeur d'Alene. The WFM immediately called for outlawing the hiring of labor spies, but their demand was ignored.

The WFM embraced the tradition that their organization was born in the Boise, Idaho, jail. Many years later, WFM Secretary-Treasurer Bill Haywood stated at a convention of the United Mine Workers of America that the Western Federation of Miners:

...are not ashamed of having been born in jail, because many great things and many good things have emanated from prison cells.

Charlie Siringo was not the only agent to have infiltrated the Coeur d'Alene miners' unions. In his book Big Trouble, author J. Anthony Lukas mentions that Thiel Operative 53 had also infiltrated, and had been the union secretary at Wardner. One of the demands of the WFM's founding Preamble was the prohibition of armed detectives.

Coeur d'Alene Miners engaged in another confrontation with mine owners in the Coeur d'Alene, Idaho labor confrontation of 1899.

== See also ==
- Bunker Hill Mine and Smelting Complex
- Coeur d'Alene, Idaho labor confrontation of 1899
- Coeur d'Alene miners' dispute (overview of both Coeur d'Alene incidents)
- Ed Boyce, WFM leader
- Charlie Siringo, Pinkerton agent, labor spy, and hired gunman
- George Pettibone, WFM union supporter, later accused and acquitted of conspiracy to murder former Idaho Governor Steunenberg
- Labor spies
- Cripple Creek miners' strike of 1894, the WFM in Colorado
- Colorado Labor Wars of 1903-04
- Murder of workers in labor disputes in the United States
