= Employers Group =

Employer advocacy organization

Employers Group was founded as the Merchants and Manufacturers Association (M&M) in 1896 in California. It has become a worldwide organization advocating for employers and giving guidance about employment laws and regulations, professional development, consulting projects, and compensation and workplace trends surveys.

When founded, the organization's goal was to secure the open shop in all workplaces in the city. In the latter half of the 20th century, the organization became a human resources consulting firm. In 1993, the Merchants and Manufacturers Association merged with the Federated Group of San Francisco to create the Employers Group. The organization's current president and chief executive officer is Mark Wilbur.

== Formation and early history ==
Employer's Group was founded in 1893 in Los Angeles as the Merchants Association. Its goal was to promote local products, and manufacturing companies, railroads, shipping companies, department stores, breweries and food markets were some of its charter members. One of its most prominent members was the Los Angeles Times.

The association launched a number of civic projects early in its history. In 1897, it created the annual Fiesta de las Flores to promote locally produced goods and services. The festival eventually merged with the Tournament of Roses Parade in Pasadena, California.

=== The open shop battle ===
M&M's focus over its first three decades was primarily on industrial relations. The Merchant's Association had acted primarily as a promoter of local industry. But when Harrison Gray Otis, publisher of the Los Angeles Times, joined the body in 1896, the association underwent a transformation. It adopted a new name (the Merchants and Manufacturers Association, or M&M), and began vehemently promoting the open shop. The nascent labor movement in Los Angeles collapsed, and Los Angeles remained largely union-free until the 1930s.

On October 1, 1910, a bomb exploded at a printing plant owned by the Times. Twenty-one workers were killed in the fire which followed. Otis declared the bombing the "Crime of the Century" and used his newspaper's large circulation to whip up public sentiment against unions. A second bombing at an iron works in the city on Christmas Day worsened the hysteria in the city. The M&M contributed $50,000 ($1.1 million in 2007 dollars) to a city effort to hire private detectives to track down the perpetrators. In April 1911, Ortie McManigal, a staff representative with the International Association of Bridge and Structural Iron Workers, was apprehended by private detectives in Illinois. McManigal confessed to bombing the iron works and implicated the union's national secretary-treasurer John J. McNamara and his brother James B. McNamara in the Times bombing.

The American Federation of Labor (AFL), Eugene Debs and others rallied to the defense of The McNamara Brothers. The brothers were defended in court by famed attorney Clarence Darrow. Darrow was increasingly skeptical of the chance for an acquittal. Darrow attempted to arrange a plea bargain. The state of California was on the verge of accepting the plea bargain when Darrow was arrested for attempting to bribe a member of the jury. The state rejected the plea. James McNamara was sentenced to life, and died in San Quentin State Prison of cancer in 1941. His brother John McNamara served seven years, and died a few months after his brother of a heart attack in Butte, Montana. Darrow was tried for attempted bribery. The first trial ended in a mistrial, the second in a jury deadlock. The state dropped the charges against Darrow.

In 1921, the Industrial Relations Committee of San Francisco formed to promote the open shop in San Francisco. In time, that organization changed its name to the Federated Employers of the Bay Area and merged with M&M in 1993.

== 1930s ==
In 1937, M&M was joined in the labor relations field by a new organization, Southern Californians, Inc. Sponsored by the Los Angeles Times, the group was led by Paul Shoup, a retired vice chairman of the Southern Pacific Railroad. Southern Californians was founded ostensibly to promote the welfare of Los Angeles, but in testimony before the United States Congress later that year its leaders admitted that its sole goal was the preservation of the open shop. In less than three years, it had collected more than $523,000 from 12 major Los Angeles companies to fight the city's unions. Southern Californians spent $48,000 to create two other front-groups: The Neutral Thousands (which claimed 109,000 members but had had only 250; it had copied names out of the telephone book and put them on its "official" membership list) and Women of the Pacific (led by a strikebreaker from Seattle).

M&M and Southern Californians decided the best way to stamp out unions was to remove the unions' most powerful weapons: the strike and picket line. M&M quickly established its own front group, the Employers' Advisory Service, to help employers set company unions. Both Southern Californians and M&M spent more than $123,000 in 1937 to promote a voter referendum which would outlaw the strike and picket line. Their opportunity came when a Republican Party group began digging up dirt on Republican Mayor Frank L. Shaw. Voters were outraged when a private detective employed by the reform group was nearly killed by a car bomb planted by Shaw's organization. Another Republican, Superior Court Judge Fletcher Bowron, began a recall effort against Shaw. M&M and Southern Californians used the recall election to push through their ordinance. The new law explicitly outlawed picketing entirely unless a majority of a firm's employees were on strike, made it illegal for anyone except a striking employee to picket a firm, limited pickets to one person per entrance or pickets at least 25 feet apart, prohibited coercion and intimidation by unions, forbade unions to talk to workers at home, and even outlawed unions' use of abusive or foul language. A compromise referendum pushed by the AFL prohibited public disorder and intimidation, but not picketing. The voters approved the M&M referendum, turned out Mayor Shaw, and elected Judge Bowron (who had flatly condemned the M&M referendum as blatantly unconstitutional).

M&M's activities were later exposed before the La Follette Committee in 1937 and 1938.

== See also ==
- Lloyd G. Davies, Los Angeles City Council member, 1943–51, M&MA public relations representative
