= J. Bernard Hogg =

American historian

J. Bernard Hogg (1908–1994) was an American labor historian.

He was the first chairman of the former Shippensburg State College's history/philosophy department and also taught at Indiana University.

Hogg graduated from Slippery Rock University and the University of Pittsburgh and the University of Chicago.

== Publications ==
Hogg's Ph.D. dissertation at the University of Chicago in 1943 was “The Homestead Strike of 1892."

"Public Reaction to Pinkertonism and the Labor Question," published in Pennsylvania History: A Journal of Mid-Atlantic Studies 11, no. 3 (July 1944), pages 171–199.

The Presbyterian Church of Shippensburg, 1798-1984 : a changing church in a changing world, published 1984

The Allegheny Society of American Foresters : a seventy-five year history, 1922-1997 / J Bernard Hogg; Ronald J Sheay, 1997

== Honors ==
The class of 1949 at Shippensburg University established a Dr. J. Bernard Hogg Memorial Scholarship fund.

== See also ==
- The Homestead Strike
- The Pinkerton National Detective Agency
- Labor spies
