= La Follette Committee =

1936–41 US congressional investigation into industrial espionage

In the United States Senate, the La Follette Civil Liberties Committee, or more formally,

Committee on Education and Labor, Subcommittee Investigating Violations of Free Speech and the Rights of Labor (1936–1941), began as an inquiry into a National Labor Relations Board (NLRB) investigation of methods used by employers in certain industries to avoid collective bargaining with unions.

Between 1936 and 1941, the subcommittee published exhaustive hearings and reports on the use of industrial espionage, private police agencies, strikebreaking services, munitions in industrial warfare, and employers' associations to break strikes and to disrupt legal union activities in other ways. Robert M. La Follette Jr., a Republican and Wisconsin Progressive Party–National Progressives senator from Wisconsin, chaired the committee.

The committee investigated the five largest detective agencies: the Pinkerton National Detective Agency, the William J. Burns International Detective Agency, the National Corporation Service, the Railway Audit and Inspection Company and the Corporations Auxiliary Company. Most of the agencies subpoenaed, including the Pinkerton Agency, attempted to destroy their records before receiving the subpoenas, but enough evidence remained to "piece together a picture of intrigue". It was revealed that Pinkerton had operatives "in practically every union in the country". Of 1,228 operatives, there were five in the United Mine Workers, nine in the United Rubber Workers, seventeen in the United Textile Workers, and fifty-five in the United Auto Workers that had organized General Motors.

The committee reported that as late as 1937, its census of working labor spies from 1933 to 1937 totaled 3,871 for the period. Private security firms like Pinkerton and Burns were employed to infiltrate labor unions. The committee concluded that espionage was "the most efficient method known to management to prevent unions from forming, to weaken them if they secure a foothold, and to wreck them when they try their strength."

The committee also reported:

Such a spy system ... places the employer in the very heart of the union council from the outset of any organizing effort. News of organizers coming into a town, contacts the organizers make among his employees, the names of employees who join the union, all organization plans, all activities of the union—these are as readily available to the employer as though he himself were running the union.

Although the inquiry by the committee achieved minor legal resolutions, it failed to achieve any effective regulatory legislation that might have curtailed the worst practices of strike-breaking agencies. Despite this, the revelations enraged the public as it brought more attention to the grievances of laborers.

== History ==
The La Follette Committee was created after the National Labor Relations Act of 1935. In an effort to employ the best suited labor management system between unions and employers, the National Labor Relations Act established the National Labor Relations Board. Heber Blankenhorn, of the NLRB, began the La Follette Committee and was its conspirator for four years. A subcommittee then became established as the chairman of the Committee on Education and Labor, Senator Elbert Thomas of Utah, appointed Wisconsin Senator La Follette Jr. to manage the organization. Labeled "Son of the Wild Jackass," and with a prominent politician as a brother, the reputation of La Follette Jr.'s family preceded him. As the newly appointed chairman to the subcommittee of the Senate Committee on Education and Labor, La Follette's committee consisted of pro-Republican staff members. La Follette's gifted team of researchers, investigators, attorneys, and writers arose as a prominent governmental team supporting mass labor during the New Deal administration.

== Initial grievances of the committee ==
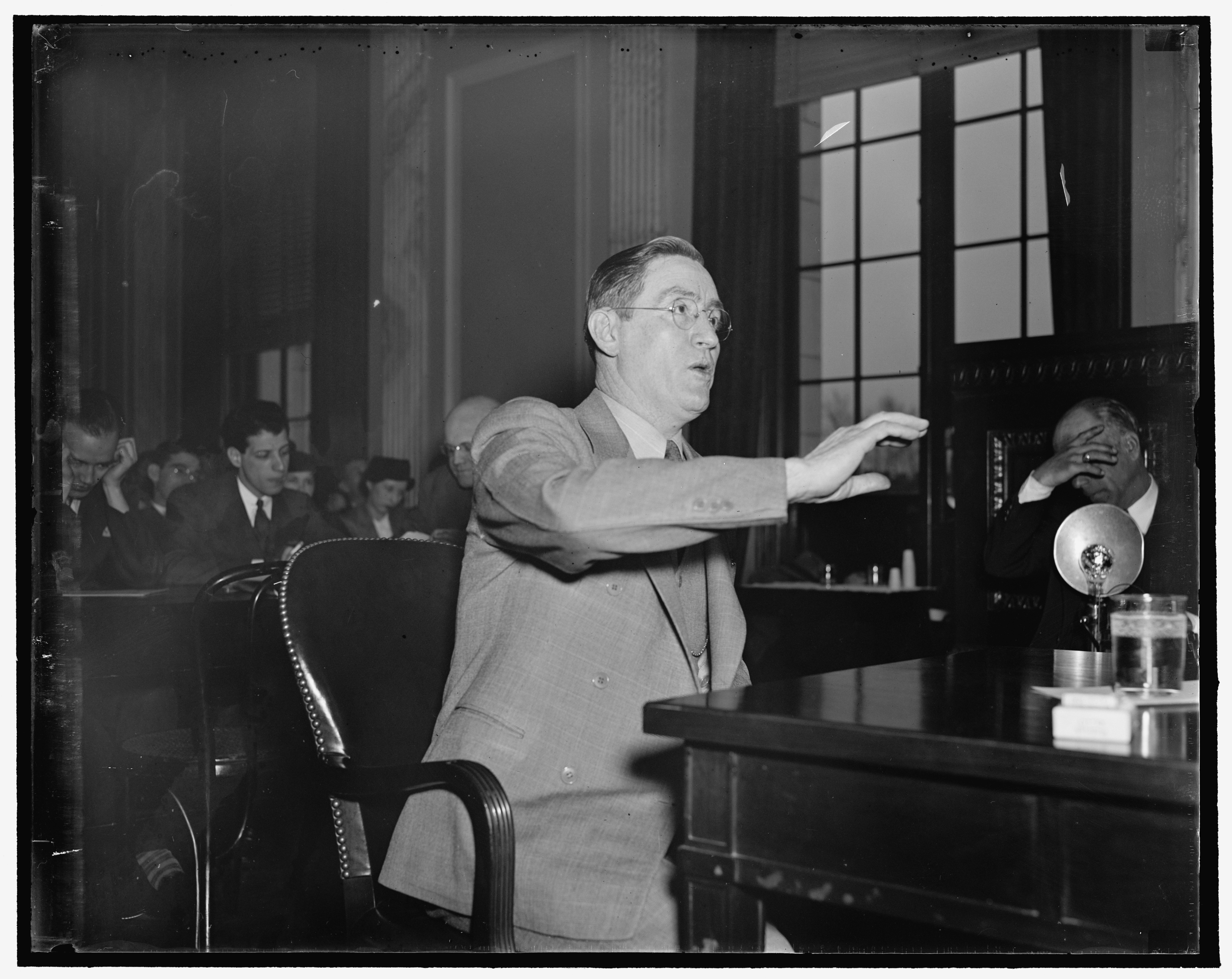
John Dalrymple, president of the United Rubber Workers of America, testifies in March 1937 that a beating he received in Gadsden, Alabama, caused him to be hospitalized for several weeks with a concussion.

From 1936 to 1937, the La Follette Committee began its assessment of four prominent anti-union practices which suppressed the advancement of organized laborers. The committee's intentions lay in preserving the rights of the worker when denied by employers, and in 1937, found industrial espionage to be a common tool employed against unions. From "motion-picture producers to steel makers," the enormous number of companies resorting to espionage, reported the La Follette Committee, prevented the practice of collective bargaining between companies and employees. Spies of corporations befriended victims into creating reports which they used to forewarn employers of potential strikes and assemblies. Spying, the La Follette Committee declared, weakens unions and "incites to violence, preaches strikes, inflames the hot-headed and leads the union to disaster". Detective agencies and those utilizing industrial espionage resorted to the protection against radicalism, exposure of theft, deterrence of sabotage, and improvement of labor-management relations as justification of their actions. The Federal Union of Automobile Workers, consisting of 26,000 members in the General Motors plant in 1934, was reported as having at least several spies in the union's executive board. Within two years, membership of the union dropped to merely 120. The committee affirmed that through the employment of espionage, employees became subjugated to private corporations and were denied constitutional rights.

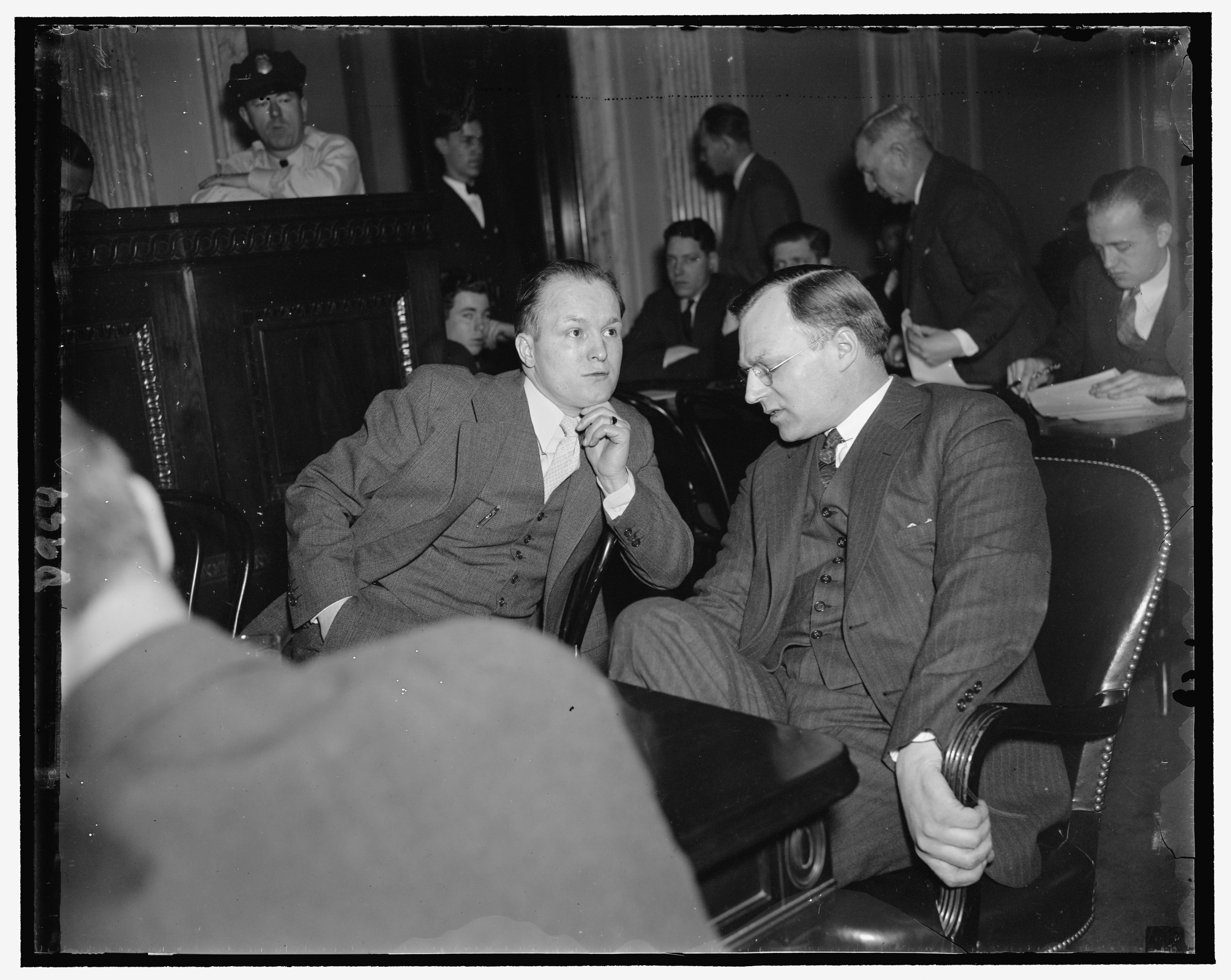
John W. Young (right), president of Federal Laboratories, confers with his secretary during testimony before the La Follette Committee in March 1937.

The committee revealed that when espionage failed to prevent unionism, employers also exploited workers through the use of munitions in anticipation of labor trouble. With the threat of communism sweeping the nation and employers utilizing it as a scapegoat to deter unionization, munitions companies distributed various forms of deterrence. Machine guns, tear gas bombs, and clubs were a few of the hindrances wielded to prevent and disperse union meetings. The committee declared the use of these munitions as the demise of "labor relations," based upon the companies' lack of acknowledgment toward unions and only in their best economic interests. By preventing workers from freely gathering in public spaces, employers who opposed them with the use of munitions and other forms of physical coercion denied them their constitutional rights of freedom of speech and assembly. Strikebreakers were reported to be the third form of anti-union oppression utilized by employers. The committee reported many being convicted criminals, and the animosity of the strikers held towards these men creates "violence and bloodshed." The La Follette Committee confirmed the accounts of former strike breakers who described to them their role in promoting violence in an effort to display the wrongdoings of strikers.

Private police agencies offered employers the last form of union oppression. This form of industrial coercion proved to be clear by constitutional protection as the men employed by the corporations were not held accountable to anyone but their employers. Witnesses in industrial communities revealed to the committee the abusive power of private police; their constant harassment and use of physical violence repressed the First Amendment rights of citizens. Like espionage, munitions utilization, and strikebreaking, private police agencies testified to the incompatibility of industrial tyranny over the liberties of industrial workers.

== La Follette Committee and California ==
On behalf of the National Labor Relations Board, the committee made preliminary investigations in California in 1936 and 1938. Paul Taylor, one of the left-liberal staff members appointed by La Follette and his Marine Corps friend, urged him to investigate the West Coast; without the necessary funding though, the committee's chairman was doubtful. With a lack in financial stability, the committee's future seemed tentative; support from the La Follette's administration, left-sided Californians, and various worker based organizing groups, however, allowed for the committees continued existence. In 1939, with an allocation of $50,000 presented by a newly appointed California senator and with the books, The Grapes of Wrath and Factories in the Field, exposing California's working conditions to the country, the La Follette Committee was given further incentive to investigate the West Coast. The results were testimonies being held in newly opened offices in the cities of Los Angeles and San Francisco.

Despite La Follette urging his investigative team to search for infringements on constitutional rights of workers rather than the political affiliations of employers, his work became deemed as a backing to communism and became resented by those harboring anti-union ideals. Aside from employers, local law enforcement agencies, and growers showing a lack in intimidation from the committee, Republican attorney general Earl Warren demonstrated strong opposition by supporting law enforcement in resisting subpoenas. Despite strong resentment to the committee's efforts, it succeeded in depicting the premise of the violations: California laborers of the 1930s were being denied constitutional rights by employers and anti-union officials. The committee found the West Coast region under the control of a convoluted array of employer controlled associations. The premise of the committee's California study, "the existence of the National Labor Relations Act, the reaction of employee or employer organizations to its application, and their long struggle to realize or frustrate benefits which it promised," proved as a significant aspect of the committee's investigation. With its findings from the West Coast investigation, the committee found the economic interests of the employers to be guiding their actions in denying constitutional rights to their employees. As a result, the committee appealed to the government to intervene in the nation's economic existence in order to "preserve these [constitutional] rights and provide a foundation for their exercise," and claimed, "that a person possess certain rights of free speech and assembly under the Constitution which must be observed, regardless of his political affiliations, no matter how strongly these political affiliations may be proved". In an effort to utilize the federal government in defending civil liberties, La Follette introduced S.1970 in an effort to remove the four oppressive labor practices noted during the investigation. The California investigations paved the way for the La Follette Committee's effort in fighting for American laborers with senate bills opposing oppressive labor practices.

== La Follette Committee and CIO ==
At the start of the La Follett Committee's investigations, the Congress of Industrial Organizations (CIO) launched its campaign to organize the mass production of the steel, automotive, and mining industries. By calling witnesses to the stand in an effort to expose American industrial relations, the committee supported the CIO, as both organizations strove to achieve a common goal of mass unionization. The ability of both organizations to operate in harmony allowed for their shared successes. When Myron Taylor of United States Steel publicly announced that his company would make a legal arrangement with the CIO, the La Follette Committee received wide spread acknowledgment and credit. Although it brought massive amounts of testimony which linked the succumbing of constitutional rights to anti-union policy, the findings of the La Follette Committee had already been previously noted by the Industrial Relations Commission's investigations predating World War I and the Interchurch World Movement analysis in 1919. Despite this, the committee's success and notoriety exceeded previous investigative organizations because of its affiliations with the CIO. However, its continued existence was not guaranteed and its affiliations with a larger, more well known association, such as the CIO, was necessary for its accomplishments. Similarly, the CIO had no way of securing itself a victory over oppressive labor practices, and the mutually beneficial associations shared among the two organizations proved vital.

== General Motors investigation ==
The La Follette Committee's handling of General Motors (GM) exemplifies the struggles of workers whose intent of organizing made the company infringe upon their civil liberties. With word of oppressive practices, most notably espionage, reaching the founders of the committee before its official establishment, the decision to examine the events in Flint, Michigan, was a unanimous one. With intentions of bringing the tyrannical practices of the company to the attention of the public, the committee obtained first hand reports of anti-union organizations in Flint. Reports obtained by the committee also confirmed the involvement of local law enforcement, as they maintained their own espionage system set to infiltrate sit-down strikes in the state.

The La Follette Committee began its hearings of General Motors on February 15, with intentions of bolstering public opinion of the United Automobile Workers' (UAW) strikes (Auerbach 14). Accounts of spies infiltrating the UAW were disclosed at the hearing, as fifty-two members were reported as spies, relaying unionization efforts to those they worked for. Although word of the approval of the La Follette's investigation motivated the GM labor-relations director to hide all traces of the company's involvement with the union, mainly by erasing the evidence, the automobile company reported spending $839,764.41 in labor detective services, between 1934 and 1936. The hearings called for the testimony of rebellious spies and UAW organizers, such as Joseph B. Ditzel, to express their disapproval of GM labor policy and their negation of constitutional rights: "[Ditzel] could not rent a hall in Saginaw to address the automobile workers; a gang of toughs in Bay City forcibly detained him in his hotel room; he was trailed constantly in Flint before his car was sideswiped and three organizers were sent to the hospital with serious injuries". The committee's hearings uncovered the expenses of GM's espionage, its scrutiny of labor policies, and its mistreatment of workers, which publicly demonstrated the injustices toward the union. Congressional disputes resulted from the hearings as the La Follette Committee found legal success with a resolution by Key Pittman of Nevada; referring to the findings of the committee, Joseph Robinson added an amendment that rebuked any attempts at denying collective bargaining by employers and denounced their utilization of unfair labor practices. With the newly added amendment, a 75–3 vote approved the Pittman resolution by the Senate.

== See also ==
- Congress of Industrial Organizations
- National Association of Manufacturers
- National Labor Relations Act of 1935
- National Labor Relations Board
- New Deal
- United Automobile Workers
