= Sherman Service Company =

Private detectives specializing in labor cases

The Sherman Service Company was based primarily in Eastern cities of the United States. While it aimed to "render service in bettering industrial relationships", in 1919 its advisory director, R.V. Phillips, was indicted in Cook County, Illinois, on the criminal charge of trying to incite a riot, and for "fraudulent and malicious intent to unlawfully, willfully and with malice aforethought kill and murder divers [sic] large numbers of persons."

The Sherman Service Company was known to buy pages of the New York Times to proclaim its doctrines of harmony in industry, while its clout with the government was such that its employees were exempted from the military draft.

== Criminal indictment ==
The Sherman Service Company of Chicago was hired by Illinois Steel Company during a strike. An operative was told by the official who was instructing him in the performance of his duties, "[t]here is enough ammunition stored in the plant of the Illinois Steel Company at South Chicago to shoot down every striker like a dog. It was done twenty years ago, it will be done this time. The minute any of them start toward the gate, they will be shot like dogs." The Sherman Service Company sent instructions to the same operative to "stir up as much bad feeling as you possibly can between the Serbians and the Italians... The Italians are going back to work. Call up every question you can in reference to racial hatred between these two nationalities."

The goal was to convince the Serbians that the Italians were getting their jobs, and to "start them, angry, towards the gates behind which was the ammunition to shoot them down like dogs."

An account of a subsequent raid on Sherman Service offices in the Chicago Herald (November 2):

[Illinois' State Attorney Maclay] Hoyne charges that the Sherman Service, which describes itself as "Industrial Conciliators," was employed by various companies against which strikes had been called, and that its operatives committed sabotage, assaulted persons, attempted to stir up class and race prejudice, and so foment disorder that strikebreakers and troops would be thought necessary. No evidence that the employing companies connived at these methods has been obtained.

Mr. Hoyne said H. V. Phillips, advisory director for the Sherman company, "gave instructions, not only verbally, but over the telephone and in writing, to commit violence."

"There is no doubt in my mind that the Sherman Service was engaged in stirring up riots," said Mr. Hoyne. "Its operatives destroyed or advocated the destruction of property, aroused antagonism between different groups of strikers, and employed sluggers—all the time professing to be engaged in conciliating troublemakers."

Mr. Hoyne said complaint had first been made to him by Ed. Nockles, secretary of the Chicago Federation of Labor, who had as a witness Charles Stern, formerly Operative No. 300 for the Sherman Service...

Mr. Hoyne said Phillips "was particularly active in arranging for the use of sluggers, breaking of windows, cutting of auto tires, burning of buildings and stirring up racial hatred and prejudice."

"I believe there is ample evidence," Mr. Hoyne said, "to convict Phillips and a number of other officers and employes of the agency of a number of crimes..."

The indictment was subsequently quashed. After the raids, Sherman Service Company placed advertisements in its own defense which stated, in part:

Sherman Service has recently been attacked by the radical element of labor, who are opposed to the Americanization of industrial forces of this country and to the maximum and uninterrupted production which is so essential to the continuity of national progress.

Our successful activities along constructive lines in harmonizing the relationship between employer and employee wherever we serve, and in developing a spirit of whole-hearted co-operation, is the greatest stumbling block which the recent-day agitator is forced to overcome—consequently the attack.

== Government service ==
In 1920 The Nation reported that Sherman Service Company stated in an internal publication that it served the government. The Nation observed that "for this purpose its operatives become 'apparent reds'." Sherman Service Company had published that:

"Wherever ... organizations [such as the radical element of labor] exist in the community and try to influence the workers it becomes the duty of the Sherman representatives to pretend sympathy and join so as to learn who the leaders are. Such information is then supplied to the government."

== Agency aliases ==
Sherman Service Company has also assumed the names National Manufacturers' Syndicate, and National Mutual Service Co.
