= National Mining Association =

- Formation: 1995
- Headquarters: Washington, D.C.
- Chairman: Mitch Krebs
- Website: http://www.nma.org/

The National Mining Association (NMA) is a United States trade organization that lists itself as the voice of the mining industry in Washington, D.C. The NMA was formed in 1995, and has more than 250 corporate members.

== History ==
The National Mining Association was created in 1995. The organization was formed through the merger of the National Coal Association (NCA) and the American Mining Congress (AMC). These two organizations had represented the mining industry since 1897 (AMC) and 1917 (NCA).

== Advocacy ==
=== Opposition to right-to-repair legislation ===
In July 2024, NMA signed a letter to members of both the House Committee on Armed Services and the Senate Committee on Armed Services opposing Section 828 of S. 4628, the National Defense Authorization Act for Fiscal Year 2025, entitled "Requirement for Contractors to Provide Reasonable Access to Repair Materials," which would require contractors doing business with the US military to agree "to provide the Department of Defense fair and reasonable access to all the repair materials, including parts, tools, and information, used by the manufacturer or provider or their authorized partners to diagnose, maintain, or repair the good or service."

== See also ==
- Advocacy Campaign Team for Mining
