= Advocacy Campaign Team for Mining =

The Advocacy Campaign Team for Mining (ACT) is the National Mining Association's national network which provides tools to communicate with legislators at all levels of government to shape and influence public policies governing the United States mining industry.

== Projects ==
=== Federal Issue: National Environmental Policy Act (NEPA) ===
Opposes the "never-ending process, devouring millions of dollars and years of time on costly, redundant studies, conflicting requirements and wasteful litigation." As of March 8, 2006, it was asking members to write a letter with these talking points:

- NEPA does not impose deadlines for evaluating Environmental Impact Studies, causing "paralysis by analysis."
- The mining industry relies heavily on federal land to produce minerals and meet market demands. "Since 1980, the number of plans for new mining projects filed with the U.S. Bureau of Land Management has fallen steeply" and the industry is "throttled when projects never materialize and jobs are sent offshore."
- Congress must "gain a better understanding of the economic impacts of NEPA on the mining industry and American economy."

=== State Issues ===
At various times, the organization posts requests for specific actions for the states of Colorado, Kentucky, Montana, Ohio, Oregon, Virginia, Washington and West Virginia.
