= Goon squad =

Type of group of criminals

A goon squad is a group of criminals or mercenaries, referred to as "goons", commonly associated with either anti-union violence or pro-union violence. They may be employed in political rivalries as well.

== Etymology ==
The term "goon" was reputedly coined by F. L. Allen in 1921, perhaps a variant of the US slang "gooney" which had been around since at least 1872, meaning a simpleton or fool, which may have derived from "gony", applied by sailors to the albatross and similar big, clumsy birds (c.1839). In the late 1930s, E. C. Segar’s comic strip Popeye had a character named "Alice the Goon". It was from this character that large stupid people or stupid things came to popularly be called "goons" and the term entered into general use. "Goon" evolved into slang for a thug (1938), someone hired by racketeers to terrorize political or industrial opponents (1938), or a German stalag guard for American POWs (1945).

== United States ==
During the labor unrest of the late 19th century in the United States, businessmen hired goon squads composed of Pinkerton agents to infiltrate unions, and as guards to keep strikers and suspected unionists out of factories. One of the best known such confrontations was the Homestead Strike of 1892, in which Pinkerton agents were called in to enforce the strikebreaking measures of Henry Clay Frick, acting on behalf of Andrew Carnegie, who was abroad; the ensuing conflicts between Pinkerton agents and striking workers led to several deaths on both sides. The Pinkertons were also used as guards in coal, iron, and lumber disputes in Illinois, Michigan, New York, and Pennsylvania, as well as the Great Railroad Strike of 1877.

In 1958 the McClellan Committee discussed a goon squad as a group of mercenaries, commonly associated with labor relations issues, although they may be employed in other situations as well.

In cases of anti-union violence, goon squads have been traditionally hired by employers as an attempt at union busting, and resort to many of the same tactics, including intimidation, espionage, and assault. In some cases, corporations have been formed specifically to provide the services of goon squads. The Corporations Auxiliary Company was a corporation created to conduct "the administration of industrial espionage", providing goon squads and labor spies in exchange for payment. In 1921 the Corporations Auxiliary Company was known to masquerade under a dozen different names, and specialized in electing its agents to union office in order to control or destroy unions.

In 2023, five deputies and a police officer in Mississippi were charged with and pleaded guilty to torturing two black men at a home. The six officers reportedly referred to themselves as the "Goon Squad".

In cases of pro-union violence, a goon squad may be formed by union members or leaders to intimidate or assault non-union workers, strikebreakers, or parties (sometimes including union members) who do not cooperate with the directives of union leadership. In 1930s Seattle, with Dave Beck as Teamster leader, pro-union violence was reported where a goon squad intimidated or assaulted non-union workers and strikebreakers.

In 2014, a goon squad of Pennsylvania ironworkers, who referred to themselves as "The Helpful Union Guys" (THUGS) pleaded guilty to engaging in pro-union intimidation tactics which included slashing tires, assaulting non-union workers and blockading worksites. In 2009, a goon squad associated with a Teamsters leader in Boston used intimidation tactics with fellow union members over seniority rights; in one case a goon assaulted another Teamster who criticized a local Union leader.

== Kenya ==
As of 2026, in Kenya, "goons" are thugs hired by politicians to intimidate supporters of their opponents. Women are also involved in organising the networks of goons, who are also hired by powerful business people, in a practice known as "goonism". The goons are mainly illiterate, unemployed young men. They are managed by the wasangwenya ("representatives"), who receive orders from politicians and others, negotiate payment, and appoint leaders of the goons. The "kingpins" or "big fish" are at the top of the ladder, and meet with the politicians or other hirers.

== In the arts ==
The 2010 novel A Visit from the Goon Squad won the 2011 Pulitzer Prize for Fiction. The novel refers to time as "the goon squad" and "a goon", emphasizing how time robs most of the characters of their youth, innocence, and success.

== See also ==
- Guardians of the Oglala Nation (GOONs) – Lakota paramilitary force
- Labor spying in the United States
- Union busting
- Union violence
