= William J. Burns International Detective Agency =

Private detective agency

Former office building in Briarcliff Manor

The William J. Burns International Detective Agency was a private detective agency in the United States, which was operated by William J. Burns. Founded in 1909, the agency had evolved into Burns Security then Burns International by August 2000, when it was acquired by Securitas AB. From 1969 to 1983 it was headquartered in Briarcliff Manor, New York.

== Brotherhood of Timber Workers ==
The Burns Detective Agency was one of the primary agencies employed by the Southern Lumber Operator's Association to break the interracial union, The Brotherhood of Timber Workers, from 1910 to 1916.

== Wheatland Hop Riot ==
The Burns Agency was hired to track down Industrial Workers of the World (IWW) organizers in the aftermath of the Wheatland Hop Riot.

== Labor suppression in Arizona ==
Burns agents infiltrated the Industrial Workers of the World during an organizing drive in the copper mines of Arizona. Activities included issuing fake IWW membership cards, infiltrating the workforce, spying, and intercepting the mail of organizers.

== Teapot Dome scandal ==
Agents of the Burns Detective Agency were hired to "investigate" jurors in a federal trial of Harry F. Sinclair in November 1927. Sinclair hired William J. Burns to have 14 agents follow the jurors and produce daily reports on their activities. The arrangement resulted in a mistrial. In a new hearing, Sinclair claimed that he was concerned about the welfare of the jurors. Sinclair was convicted on corruption charges and sentenced to six months in jail. William J. Burns was sentenced to 15 days' imprisonment, and Burns' son, William Sherman Burns, was ordered to pay a $1,000 fine. The Supreme Court later reversed William J. Burns' conviction.

== See also ==
- Anti-union violence
- Anti-union organizations in the United States
- Baldwin–Felts Detective Agency
- Bisbee Deportation
- Damnation (TV series)
- Industrial Workers of the World
- Labor spies
- Pinkerton National Detective Agency
