= Anti-union organizations in the United States =

History of anti-union movement in the United States

In the United States shortly after 1900, few effective employers' organizations opposed the union movement. By 1903, these organizations started to coalesce, and a national employers' movement began to exert a powerful influence on industrial relations and public affairs.

== History ==
For nearly a decade prior to 1903, an industrial union called the Western Federation of Miners (WFM) had been increasing in power, militancy, and radicalism as a response to dangerous working conditions, employer-employee inequality, the imposition of long hours of work, and what members perceived as an imperious attitude on the part of employers. In particular, members of the WFM had been outraged by employers' widespread use of labor spies in organizing efforts such as Coeur d'Alene. The miners' frustrations had occasionally exploded in anger and violence, but they had also tried peaceful change and found that route impossible. For example, after winning a referendum vote for the eight-hour day with support from 72% of Colorado's electorate, the WFM's goal of an eight-hour law was still defeated by employers and politicians.

In 1901, angry WFM members passed a convention proclamation that a "complete revolution of social and economic conditions" was "the only salvation of the working classes." To employers, the statement seemed tantamount to a declaration of war. Colorado employers and their supporters reacted to growing union restlessness and power in a confrontation that came to be called the Colorado Labor Wars.

Fear and apprehension on the part of employers, who felt unions were threatening to their businesses, were by no means limited to Colorado. Across the nation, the first elements of a network of employers' organizations that would span the coming century were just beginning to arise.

== Council for Union Free Environment ==
The Council on a Union Free Environment was formed to counter union activity in firms. It existed from the 1970s until its dissolution in the 1990s.

== Littler Mendelson ==
Littler Mendelson is a law firm based in San Francisco, CA, frequently retained by employers who wish to use its union-busting tactics.

== See also ==
- Anti-union violence
- History of union busting in the United States
- Union organizer
- Union threat model
- Salt (union organizing)
