= Thiel Detective Service Company =

American private detective agency

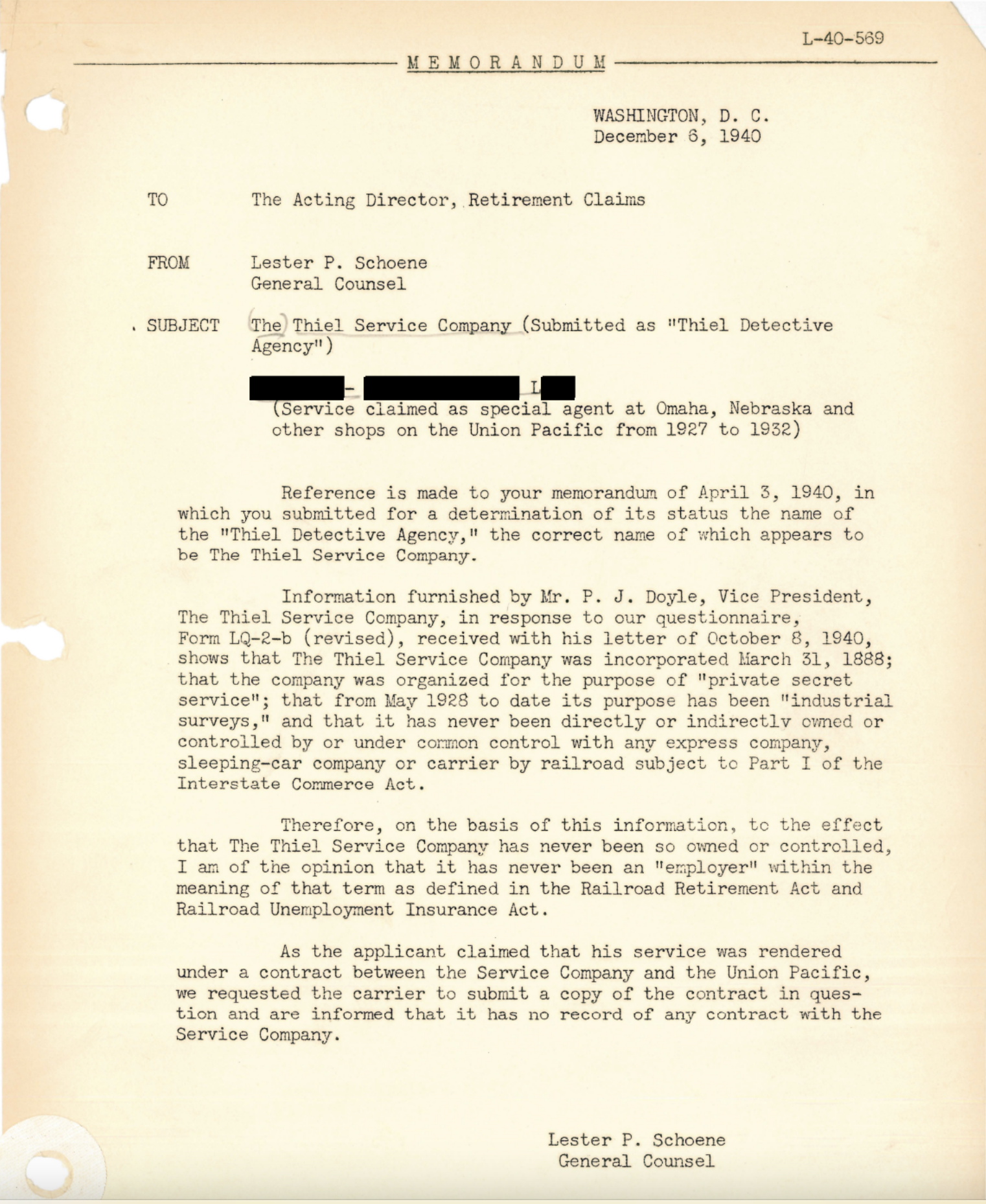
1940 U.S. Government Memorandum concerning Thiel Detective Service Company's incorporation and nature of business.

The Thiel Detective Service Company was a private detective agency formed in 1873 by George H. Thiel, a former Civil War spy and Pinkerton employee. The company was incorporated March 31, 1888 for the purpose of "private secret service". From May, 1888 through at least 1940, its purpose was "industrial surveys". The Thiel Detective Service Company headquarters were in St. Louis, Missouri.

The company was formed to be a direct competitor to the Pinkerton Detective Agency. According to Pinkerton history, it never achieved this status with the Burns Detective Agency being Pinkerton's largest competitor. Another source claimed Thiel was a successful nationwide agency and a direct competitor to Pinkerton.

By the late 1890s, Thiel had seven offices. By October, 1900, there were ten offices: St. Louis, New York, Chicago, St. Paul, MN, Kansas City, MO, Denver, CO, Seattle and Portland, OR in the US and City of Mexico, Mexico and Montreal, Canada. In 1913, company letterhead indicated there were 19 offices with the additions of Los Angeles, San Francisco, Dallas, Atlanta, El Paso, Spokane, Toronto, Ontario and Winnipeg, Manitoba.

Many of the agents employed by Thiel spied on railroad workers, covering every state and territory in the Union, as well as Canadian provinces between Vancouver Island and Nova Scotia. They referred to themselves as "testers", meaning that they tested employees' honesty, while railroad workers called them "spotters".

The Thiel Agency was also involved in infiltrating and breaking a number of labor union strikes in the United States and Canada, much as the Pinkerton agency was. After the Homestead Strike, the Thiel Detective Agency, along with the Illinois Detective Agency, U.S. Detective Agency, and Mooney and Boland's Detective Agency were investigated by both chambers of the United States Congress.

One of the company's first employees was John F. Farley, a former United States Cavalry trooper. In 1885, Farley was appointed manager of Thiel's Denver office. Farley later served as Chief of Police in Denver for two periods: 1889–1893, 1897–1901. By 1914 Farley was assistant general manager of the Thiel Detective Service Company. From his office in San Francisco he had jurisdiction over the offices in Los Angeles, Portland, Seattle and Vancouver.

== See also ==
- Murder of workers in labor disputes in the United States
