= Labor spying in the United States =

Labor spying in the United States had involved people recruited or employed for the purpose of gathering intelligence, committing sabotage, sowing dissent, or engaging in other similar activities, in the context of an employer/labor organization relationship. Spying by companies on union activities has been illegal in the United States since the National Labor Relations Act of 1935. However, non-union monitoring of employee activities while at work is perfectly legal and, according to the American Management Association, nearly 80% of major US companies actively monitor their employees.

Statistics suggest that historically trade unions have been frequent targets of labor spying. Labor spying is most typically used by companies or their agents, and such activity often complements union busting. In at least one case, an employer hired labor spies to spy not only upon strikers, but also upon strikebreakers that he had hired.

Sidney Howard observed in 1921 that the labor spy, "often unknown to the very employer who retains him through his agency, is in a position of immense strength. There is no power to hold him to truth-telling." Because the labor spy operates in secret, "all [co-workers] are suspected, and intense bitterness is aroused against employers, the innocent and the guilty alike."

Historically, one of the most incriminating indictments of the labor spy business may have been the testimony of Albert Balanow (some sources list the name as Ballin or Blanow) during an investigation of the detective agencies' roles during the Red Scare. Albert Balanow had worked with both the Burns Detective Agency and the Thiel Detective Agency. Balanow testified that the Red Scare was all about shaking down businessmen for protection money. "If there is no conspiracy, you've got to make a conspiracy in order to hold your job."

The sudden exposure of labor spies has driven workers "to violence and unreason", including at least one shooting war.

== Definition ==
Labor spies are usually agents employed by corporations, or hired through the services of union busting agencies, for the purpose of monitoring, disempowering, subverting, or destroying labor unions, or undermining actions taken by those unions.

[The labor spy] capitalizes the employer's ignorance and prejudice and enters the [workplace] specifically to identify the leaders of the Labor organization, to propagandize against them and blacklist them and to disrupt and corrupt their union. He is under cover, disguised as a worker, hired to betray the workers' cause.

Labor spies may be referred to as spies, operatives, agents, agents provocateurs, saboteurs, infiltrators, informants, spotters, plants, special police, or detectives. However, Dr. Richard C. Cabot, Professor of Social Ethics at Harvard, observed that labor spies are different from our normal view of detectives. While detectives investigate people suspected of crimes, the labor spy shadows and spies upon people who are not suspected of having committed any crime, nor are they suspected of planning any crime. During the mid-to-late-19th century, a period during which there was intense distaste for the detective profession, the Pinkerton and Thiel detective agencies referred to their field agents as operatives or testers. The Pinkerton logo inspired the expression private eye.

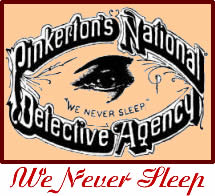
Historic Pinkerton logo

Operatives employed for labor spying may be professional, recruited from the public, or recruited from members of a particular workforce for a specific operation such as strike breaking. They may be directly employed by the company, or they may report to the company through an agency.

Some agencies that provide such operatives to corporations offer full protective and union busting services, such as security guards, training, providing weaponry (including, historically, machine guns), intelligence gathering, research, and strike-breaker recruitment services. Other agencies are more specialized.

Both the spy agencies and the companies that employ labor spies prefer to keep their activities secret. Some labor leaders have likewise sought to downplay the extent of industrial spying. This, in spite of the fact that "industrial spies have played both sides against each other, and have been at the bottom of a great deal of the violence and corruption of industrial conflict."

The companies seek to avoid embarrassment and bad public relations. The spy agencies also concern themselves with "possible danger attendant upon discovery, and second, because the operative is thereafter a marked man ... his usefulness to the Agency is ended." Therefore, actual labor spy reports, and even records of their existence, are a rare commodity.

Corporations are not subject to freedom of information requirements or sunshine laws, and therefore corporate practices such as spying are rarely subject to public scrutiny. However, historic examples of labor spying that have come to light provide a fairly substantive overview.

== Labor spy techniques ==
A letter from the Burns Detective Agency declared to the employer, "[w]ithin the heart of your business is where we operate, down in the dark corners, in out-of-the-way places that cannot be seen from your office ..."

To stop a union proponent—a pusher, in the anti-union lexicon—the [union] buster will go anywhere, not just to the lunch room, but into the bedroom if necessary. The buster not only is a terrorist; he is also a spy. My team and I routinely pried into workers' police records, personnel files, credit histories, medical records, and family lives in search of a weakness that we could use to discredit union activists.

— Martin Jay Levitt, 1993, Confessions of a Union Buster

Labor spies may employ techniques of surreptitious monitoring, "missionary" work (see below), sabotage, provoking chaos or violence, frameups, intimidation, or insinuating themselves into positions of authority from which they may alter the basic goals of an organization. A National Labor Relations Board chairman testified about the results of these techniques:

The mystery and deadly certainty with which this scheme [labor spying] operated was so baffling to the men that they each suspected the others, were afraid to meet or to talk and the union was completely broken.

A labor spy observed,

Those labor unions were so hot, crying about spies, that everything was at fever pitch and they look at each other with blood in their eyes.

As one example of the impact of spying, a union local at the Underwood Elliot Fisher Company plant was so damaged by undercover operatives that membership dropped from more than twenty-five hundred, to fewer than seventy-five.

=== Intelligence ===
In 1906, officers of the Corporations Auxiliary Company announced that they had labor spies at the annual convention of the American Federation of Labor. For fifteen dollars, prospective clients could have a "full and complete report of the entire proceedings." By 1919, spying on workers had become so common that steel company executives had accumulated six hundred spy reports. Some of them were accurate transcriptions of the secret meetings of union locals.

In order to elicit business, some agencies would send secret operatives into a prospective client's factory without permission. A report would be prepared and submitted to the startled manager, revealing conspiracies of sabotage and union activities.

Workers who were bribed to provide information to operatives often believed that the destination was an insurance agency, or interested stockholders. They never imagined that their reports on co-workers were destined for the corporation. Such workers were said to be "hooked," and in spy agency parlance those who reeled them in were called "hookers."

=== Missionary work ===
Once in a while, a worker is impeccable. So some consultants resort to lies. To fell the sturdiest union supporters in the 1970s, I frequently launched rumors that the targeted worker was gay or was cheating on his wife. It was a very effective technique ...

— Martin Jay Levitt, 1993, Confessions of a Union Buster

Missionary work means deploying undercover operatives to create dissent on the picket lines and in union halls, for example, by utilizing whispering campaigns or unfounded rumors. Missionaries frequently directed their whispering campaigns toward strikers' families and communities. For example, female operatives would visit the wives of strikers in their homes, incorporating their cover story into their spiel. They would tell the wife sad stories about how their own spouse lost a job years ago because of a strike, and hasn't found work since, and "that's why I must sell these products door to door."

Another target was merchants who catered to strikers, who could be turned against the union by asserted claims of financial risks.

Missionary campaigns have been known to destroy not only strikes, but unions themselves.

=== Provocations ===
Undercover management agents have acted to create provocations within labor ranks. Examples include:

... historians Philip Taft and Philip Ross have pointed out that "IWW activity was virtually free of violence ... It is of some interest to note that a speaker who advocated violence at a meeting at the IWW hall in Everett [Washington, where the Everett massacre occurred] was later exposed as a private detective.

And in the aftermath of the Colorado Labor Wars,

William B. Easterly, president of WFM District Union No. 1 [in the Cripple Creek District], testified that the only person who discussed violence at Altman WFM meetings during the strike turned out to be a detective.

Provocations also took the form of fomenting racial strife. The Sherman Service Company, Inc., of Chicago sent instructions to an operative to "stir up as much bad feeling as you possibly can between the Serbians and the Italians ... The Italians are going back to work. Call up every question you can in reference to racial hatred between these two nationalities."

In 1919-1920, a religious commission investigating labor spies was itself the target of labor spying. A labor spy followed the investigators, and sent a report to United States Steel Corporation alleging that the investigators were "members of the I.W.W. and Reds." One document similarly characterized them as "Pink Tea Socialists and Parlor Reds." One spy report included a cover letter from Ralph M. Easley of the National Civic Federation to the offices of United States Steel Corporation requesting that a list of clergymen "be kicked out of their positions" because of the investigation. The actual commission responded that none of the clergymen on the list were in any way connected with the investigation.

=== Operatives in high places ===
In the 1930s nearly one-third of the twelve-hundred labor spies working for the Pinkerton Agency held high-level positions in the targeted unions, including one national vice-presidency, fourteen local presidencies, eight local vice-presidencies, and numerous secretary positions. Sam Brady, a veteran Pinkerton operative, held a high enough position in the International Association of Machinists that he was able to damage the union by precipitating a premature strike. Pinkerton operatives drove out all but five officers in a United Auto Workers local in Lansing, Michigan. The remaining five were Pinkertons.

== A historical overview ==
As early as 1855, the Pinkerton National Detective Agency provided "spotters" to expose dishonest and lazy railroad conductors. However, the program unraveled when, after a train accident in November 1872, papers found on the body of a Pinkerton operative revealed that the agency had been using deceitful practices.

In 1869, garment workers formed the Noble Order of the Knights of Labor as a secret labor organization, largely in response to spying by an employer. The resulting blacklist had been used to destroy their union.

At an 1888 convention of the Brotherhood of Locomotive Engineers that was held in Richmond, Virginia, delegates organized a special committee to search out hiding places that might be used by labor spies. They discovered a newspaper reporter, and determined to hold meetings behind closed doors. Note-taking was forbidden. Their concerns were justified, but the effort failed; two Pinkerton operatives had infiltrated the convention as delegates from Reading, Pennsylvania. They composed elaborate reports on all the issues and discussions and recorded all the minutes of the meetings at the convention.

Beginning in the latter decades of the 19th century, agencies that supplied security and intelligence services to business clients were essentially private police forces, and were accountable only to their clients. The private police agencies declined with the development of professional public police departments, but they continued to be employed by mine owners in "frontier environments" well into the 20th century.

By the dawn of the muckraking era, employers increasingly turned to espionage services. E. H. Murphy once told a midwestern industrialist,

We have the reputation of being several jumps ahead of the old way of settling capital and labor difficulties ... Our service aims to keep our clients informed through the medium of intelligence reports.

"In December [of 1920] ten important officials of the Labor unions of Akron, Ohio, were exposed as confessed and convicted spies of the Corporations Auxiliary Company, a concern whose business is the administration of industrial espionage."

By the 1930s, industrial espionage had become not just an accepted part of labor relations, it was the most important form of labor discipline services that was provided by the anti-union agencies. More than two hundred agencies offered undercover operatives to their clients.

During the 1930s, thirty-two mining companies, twenty-eight automotive firms, and a similar number of food companies relied upon labor spies. A member of the National Labor Relations Board estimated that American industrialists spent eighty million dollars spying on their workers. General Motors alone spent nearly a million dollars for undercover operatives fighting the CIO during a two-year period. In addition to the Pinkertons, General Motors hired thirteen other spy agencies to monitor workers in its factories, and then used the Pinkertons to spy on operatives from these other agencies.

Between 1933 and 1935, the Pinkerton Agency employed twelve hundred undercover operatives and operated out of twenty-seven offices. The agency assigned agents to three hundred companies during the 1930s. In 1936 Robert Pinkerton announced a change of focus for the Pinkerton Agency. The days of strike-breaking agencies marshalling large numbers of strike-breakers to defeat strikes were over. The Pinkerton Agency was determined to "place emphasis on its undercover work which, being secret, created less antagonism."

While more overt forms of labor control often led to violence, the undercover operator or missionary was able to destroy unionization efforts without alarming the public.

— Robert Michael Smith, From Blackjacks to Briefcases, 2003.

The National Labor Relations Act of 1935 outlawed spying on and intimidating union activists, provoking violence, and company unions. However, spying on workers and harassing them continued, according to testimony before congress in 1957. Other abuses by labor consulting firms included manipulating union elections through bribery and coercion; threatening to revoke workers' benefits if they organized; installing union officers sympathetic to management; and, offering rewards to employees who worked against unions.

In 1944, historian J. Bernard Hogg, surveying the history of labor spying, observed that Pinkerton agents were secured "by advertising, by visiting United States recruiting offices for rejectees, and by frequenting waterfronts where men were to be found going to sea as a last resort of employment," and that "[to] labor they were a 'gang of toughs and ragtails and desperate men, mostly recruited by Pinkerton and his officers from the worst elements of the community.'"

=== Investigations ===
At the prompting of Congressman Thomas E. Watson, the U.S. House of Representatives investigated detective agencies after the Homestead Strike. The Senate also investigated, and both houses issued reports in 1893. In addition to the Pinkertons, the Thiel Detective Agency, the U.S. Detective Agency, Mooney and Boland's Detective Agency, and the Illinois Detective Agency were involved in the hearings.

The Commission on Industrial Relations took testimony about espionage agencies in 1915, as did a privately funded investigation of the steel strike of 1919.

In 1936, a U.S. Senate Resolution called for an investigation of violations of the right to free speech and assembly and of interference with the right of labor to organize and bargain collectively. At the time, 30% of Pinkerton's business resulted from its industrial services. Between 1936 and 1941, the La Follette Civil Liberties Committee of the U.S. Congress held hearings and published reports on the phenomenon of labor spying, and other aspects of industrial relations. The committee established that in some cases, a company was able to lock out its workers three days prior to a strike, based upon information that Pinkerton services provided. An example report from an informant was introduced into evidence, demonstrating that such reports singled out individual workers. The Senate, with the House of Representatives concurring, passed a resolution that, "... the so-called industrial spy system breeds fear, suspicion and animosity, tends to cause strikes and industrial warfare and is contrary to sound public policy."

The La Follette Committee investigated the five largest detective agencies: the Pinkerton National Detective Agency, William J. Burns International Detective Agency, the National Corporation Service, the Railway Audit and Inspection Company, and the Corporations Auxiliary Company. Most of the agencies subpoenaed, including the Pinkerton Agency, attempted to destroy their records before receiving the subpoenas, but enough evidence remained to "piece together a picture of intrigue". It was revealed that Pinkerton had operatives "in practically every union in the country". Of 1,228 operatives, there were five in the United Mine Workers, nine in the United Rubber Workers, seventeen in the United Textile Workers, and fifty-five in the United Auto Workers that had organized General Motors.

The rationale for spying on unions was detection of Communists. "Upon examination, however, superintendent Joseph Littlejohn admitted never finding any Communists. Labor spying, as it turned out, was merely an excuse to wreck unions."

The La Follette Committee concluded that labor spying (espionage) was "... the most efficient method known to management to prevent unions from forming, to weaken them if they secure a foothold, and to wreck them when they try their strength."

In 1957 the U.S. Senate Select Committee on Improper Activities in Labor and Management (McClellan Committee) investigated unions for corruption. They also investigated corporations and union-busting agencies. One labor relations consultant called Labor Relations Associates was found to have committed violations of the National Labor Relations Act of 1935, including spying on workers.

== Case histories and analysis ==
=== Pinkerton agent in the anthracite mines ===
One of the best known undercover agents was James McParland who, under the alias of James McKenna, infiltrated a secret society of Pennsylvania coalminers called the Molly Maguires. Debate continues over the extent of guilt on the part of the Mollies, and over the question of whether they were in some sense a labor organization, or merely a ring of assassins lashing out over unjust working conditions, inadequate pay, and the pressures of persecution against their Irish Catholic status. In any event, McParland's testimony resulted in nineteen of the Molly Maguires going to the gallows.

=== Siringo at Coeur d'Alene ===
In 1892, Pinkerton Agent Charles A. Siringo, working out of the Denver Pinkerton office, played a significant role in ending the Coeur d'Alene strike. Siringo had been hired by the Mine Owners' Protective Association (MOA) to work at the Gem mine in Gem, Idaho. Siringo used the alias C. Leon Allison to join the local miners' union, ingratiating himself by buying drinks and loaning money to his fellow miners. He was elected to the post of secretary, providing access to all of the union's books and records.

Siringo promptly began to report all union business to his employers, allowing the mine owners to outmaneuver the miners on a number of occasions. Strikers planned to intercept a train of incoming strike breakers, so the mine owners dropped off the replacement workers in an unexpected location. The local union president, Oliver Hughes, ordered Siringo to remove a page from the union record book that recorded a conversation about possibly flooding the mines, the agent mailed that page to the Mine Owners' Association. Siringo also "told his employer's clients what they wanted to hear," referring to union officials such as George Pettibone as "dangerous anarchists".

The mine owners had locked out the strikers, and were hiring strike breakers. Meanwhile, Siringo was suspected as a spy when the MOA's newspaper, the Coeur d'Alene Barbarian, began publishing union secrets. Although the union had advised the miners against violence, their anger at discovering the infiltration prompted them to blow up the Frisco mine in Gem, capturing the Gem mine, plus 150 non-union miners and company guards. Concurrent with the explosion, hundreds of miners converged on Siringo's boarding house. But Siringo had sawed a hole in the floor, and made his escape after crawling for half a block under a wooden boardwalk. He fled to the hills above Coeur d'Alene.

The miners union issued a statement deploring "the unfortunate affair at Gem and Frisco." But the governor sent in six companies of the Idaho National Guard to "suppress insurrection and violence". After the Guard secured the area, Siringo came out of the mountains to finger union leaders, and those who had participated in the attacks on the Gem and Frisco mines. He wrote that for days he was busy "putting unruly cattle in the bull pen." Siringo then returned to Denver, and the following year the miners formed the Western Federation of Miners because of the disastrous events in Coeur d'Alene in 1892. The WFM immediately called for outlawing the hiring of labor spies, but their demand was ignored.

During his career with Pinkerton, Charles Siringo discovered that clients were being cheated, supervisors were stealing agency funds, and operatives were inflating normal conversations with targeted radicals into conspiracies. When Siringo retired from the Pinkerton Agency, he was so disenchanted with his experiences that he wrote a book entitled Two Evil Isms. On the cover of the book, Uncle Sam was pictured in the grip of a boa constrictor with the names "Pinkertonism" and "Anarchism" on its sides. Frank Morn, author of The Eye That Never Sleeps, A History of the Pinkerton National Detective Agency, observed the following about Siringo's attempt at a tell-all book:

Two extremes were being joined: unbridled violence by radicals was matched by unbridled violence by business interests ... Such attacks were more damaging because they came from a man who had been [a Pinkerton] operative for over two decades.

But the Pinkerton Agency suppressed Siringo's book, and only a few copies survive.

Charlie Siringo was not the only agent to have infiltrated the Coeur d'Alene miners' unions. In his book Big Trouble, author J. Anthony Lukas mentions that Thiel Operative 53 had also infiltrated, and had been the union secretary at Wardner, Idaho. in 1906 this agent "worked inside the miners union at Goldfield, Nevada. He was trusted by many union members in mining camps throughout the Northwest."

=== Colorado's Goldmine and Mill Strike of 1903–04 ===
Agents sometimes situate themselves into key positions from which to wreak damage on the targeted union:

One of the most efficient activities of the spy in the union during a strike is to wreck the strike relief benefit fund, upon which, of course, the success of the strike so largely depends. If the spy cannot himself have access to the fund, his next policy is to spread discontent and cause the strikers to demand higher benefits than the union is able to pay. He will frequently create the impression that the fund is dishonestly handled by the union officials.

One Pinkerton spy was assigned to sabotage the union's relief program during a 1903–04 strike which wreaked so significant an impact on the future of organized labor that it came to be called the Colorado Labor Wars.

Bill Haywood, Secretary Treasurer of the Western Federation of Miners, wrote in his autobiography:

I had been having some difficulty with the relief committee of the Denver smelter men. At first we had been giving out relief at such a rate that I had to tell the chairman that he was providing the smelter men with more than they had had while at work. Then he cut down the rations until the wives of the smelter men began to complain that they were not getting enough to eat. Years later, when his letters were published in The Pinkerton Labor Spy, I discovered that the chairman of the relief committe [sic] was a Pinkerton detective, who was carrying out the instructions of the agency ...

The individual responsible for revealing this sabotage was Morris Friedman, the former stenographer of Pinkerton agent James McParland, who had moved to Denver and managed the regional Pinkerton office. Friedman found the practices of the detective agency in general, and of McParland in particular, revolting. His views are captured in a passage from his 1907 book The Pinkerton Labor Spy,

The readiness of the Western Federation [of Miners] to resent the smallest encroachments on the rights of its humblest members, the generalship displayed by the organization in its struggles with different mine owners, and the fearless and vigorous campaigns of organization carried on by the Federation, have naturally aroused the fear and apprehension of mine owners; and these fears have been studiously fanned into flames of blind and furious hatred by Pinkerton's National Detective Agency, in the endeavor of the latter institution to obtain business. At the present time in many parts of the West we find Capital openly or secretly engaged in a bitter struggle with the Western Federation of Miners, to the satisfaction and immense profit of the Pinkerton Agency.

The Agency was the first to notice the activity of the Federation, and the great financial possibilities which might be realized by engaging in a prolonged struggle with it.

But it is perhaps a mistake to say the Agency, for it was, more properly speaking, James McParland, of Mollie Maguire notoriety, whose sharp glance first took jealous note of the rapid growth of this labor union.

In his exposé of the Pinkerton Agency, Friedman provides background on the sabotage efforts of A. W. Gratias, known to Pinkerton supervisors as "No. 42."

No. 42 was invited to join the union, and a short time after was an influential member ... Mr. McParland himself drew up the instructions for No. 42. To begin with, the operative was instructed to create trouble between the leaders of the union. This he accomplished, and soon the union was divided into a number of hostile camps ... The operative was next instructed to agitate the question of strike benefits among the men, so that they would demand financial aid from the Western Federation of Miners, and he was also told to intrigue against some of the leaders, so that the union would expel them. The chiefs being out of the way, Mr. McParland hoped that the rank and file would call the strike off.

The operative became so popular with the men for demanding relief that he was appointed chairman of the Relief Committee. McParland instructed him to provide relief in such large amounts that it would drain the treasury of the Federation.

He not only supplied the men with necessities, but even with luxuries and cash to spend. The operative's extreme liberality endeared him to the men, who rewarded him by electing him president of the union. We now see the unique spectacle of a Pinkerton spy, under the direct orders of Manager McParland, as president of a Western Federation of Miners' local union, and directing a bitter strike against the smelter trust. On his elevation to the presidency the operative did not relinquish his position on the relief committee, nor would the men have permitted him to do so, as they were perfectly satisfied with the way the operative squandered the money of the Federation ...

No. 42 then became a delegate and reported to the Pinkerton Agency everything that happened at the annual WFM convention. The operative also reported that WFM Secretary-Treasurer Haywood objected to the enormous weekly relief bills. McParland instructed the operative to "cut the relief down to an extent that would almost starve the strikers, and while doing this, to throw the blame on Secretary Haywood." The operative, now holding the key positions of delegate to the convention, head of the relief committee, and president of the local, responded that he would cut the relief "as much as possible, so as to cause dissatisfaction, and get the men against the union ..."

==== Intrigue and uncertainty during the Colorado Labor Wars ====
During the Western Federation of Miners' strike in 1903, there were several examples of labor spy activities. There is the special case of Harry Orchard. While this WFM member confessed to numerous of the crimes committed during the Colorado Labor Wars, and to additional crimes, including assassinating an ex-governor. He also admitted to being a Pinkerton agent, and to being in the pay of the Mine Owners' Association.

Harry Orchard was convicted of murder in the assassination of Frank Steunenberg, an ex-governor of Idaho. But first, at McParland's prompting, Orchard tried (and failed) to take three leaders of the WFM with him.

Testimony and allegiances in the 1907 assassination conspiracy cases against Harry Orchard's alleged WFM taskmasters remain very difficult to sort out. For example, another Pinkerton agent in the Cripple Creek district, "No. 28", reported that the defense was offering him money to testify. His written account, telling the Pinkerton Agency essentially what they wanted to hear—presumably as a condition of receiving money from that source—describes how he proceeded to tell the WFM defense team what they wanted to hear; specifically, that he would attest to "the biggest collection of lies from beginning to end I ever saw on paper." However, Pinkerton Agent "No. 28" (whoever he may have been) was not called to testify for the defense. Whether his mission might have been to betray the WFM defense team on the witness stand, subtly or dramatically, can only be guessed. The prosecution did not call him either, so we have only his reports to the Agency to go by.

McParland's Pinkerton Agency beat out the Thiel Detective Agency for the assignment to investigate Steunenberg's assassination. McParland believed that the Theil Agency must have been hired by the defense for, "Repeatedly in late 1906 and early 1907, he complained that Thiel Detectives were watching his every move ..."

==== Spy vs. spy in Boston's public transit system ====
The Amalgamated Association of Street Car Employees (AASCE) sought a contract with Boston's public transit system in 1912. Company negotiator Cyrus S. Ching asked for a pledge by both sides to discontinue the use of labor spies. The union protested, claiming they had made no such use of spies. Ching summoned one of his assistants, a young man whom Ching had observed peering into records and communications that had nothing to do with his job. Ching said that he had intentionally provided misinformation to the assistant. Ching then announced that he would not fire the employee, and also that the transit company had used both spies and provocateurs against the union, but that the company would cease that practice. Encouraged by such openness, the union promptly reached an agreement with the company.

==== Matewan ====
After the Battle of Matewan, testimony in the case revealed that Charles Lively had infiltrated the union for the company. Lively later testified before the United States Senate that he had been a Baldwin-Felts detective since 1912 or 1913. During that time he had worked undercover, with his duties taking him to Missouri, Illinois, Oklahoma, Kansas, and Colorado. During the Ludlow strike in Colorado, Lively became vice-president of the United Mine Workers' local at La Veta. He returned to Mingo County, West Virginia, in early 1920. He worked undercover at Howard Collieries, a company that had a tipple destroyed by fire. The investigation was kept secret even from the coal company, and Lively was fired when he was suspected of complicity.

Lively then traveled to Matewan, and participated in UMWA efforts to organize the War Eagle, Glen Alum, and Mohawk mines of Stone Mountain Coal Company. He reported all activities to the detective agency, and even brought his family to Matewan as part of his cover. He rented the lower floor of the UMWA union hall for a restaurant. Lively befriended members and officers of the union, and reported on their activities via mail sent on the train.

After the Battle of Matewan, Sid Hatfield and Ed Chambers were summoned from the union stronghold at Matewan to answer minor strike-related sabotage charges in McDowell County. As they walked up the courthouse steps, accompanied by their wives, they were shot dead by Baldwin-Felts agents Charles Lively, Bill Salter, and Buster Pence on August 1, 1921. According to Mrs. Chambers, Lively placed a gun behind Ed Chambers' ear and fired the last shot even though she was pleading with him not to shoot again. Neither of the two men had been armed, but one of the women reported that upon returning to the steps after having been led off by the guards, she discovered that both men had pistols in their hands. Pence was heard to remark, "kill 'em with one gun, and hand 'em another one." Although scores of people witnessed the attack, due to its brazenness they were afraid to testify. The three agents were acquitted on grounds of self-defense. The murder of Sid Hatfield and Ed Chambers led to a general uprising of West Virginia coal miners.

==== The Colorado Coal Strike of 1927 ====
When Colorado Fuel and Iron (CF&I) went bankrupt in 1990, an immense quantity of archives from the corporation were released. Among the archives were reports of spies who were hired during a coal strike led by the Industrial Workers of the World (IWW), also known as the Wobblies. The spies were assigned "to glean intelligence on the Wobblies' strategies and tactics, to sow disinformation, to disrupt meetings and pickets, and to expose weaknesses in the IWW organization, finances, and leadership."

Historian J. Bernard Hogg, who wrote "Public Reaction to Pinkertonism and the Labor Question", once observed:

Much of the hard feeling toward the Pinkertons was engendered by the fact that not infrequently detectives worked their way into high positions in the union and then revealed the intentions of the organization to the employer.

Agents in the 1927 Columbine strike (we don't know if they were Pinkertons, or from a different agency) were able to approach and freely converse with top level strike leaders. Kristen Svanum was the "head of the IWW" in Colorado. An agent identified only as "XX" informed his employer,

Svanum stated that he had put in over $600.00 of his private funds to finance the IWW here in Colorado, stating that he was supplied with this money from a higher power; that he was working for a peaceful revolution of conditions in the U.S?A. [sic] I tried to cause him to say what this power was but could not do so.

Sometimes the efforts of agents failed. When a strike vote was pending, labor spy "XX" reported,

Smith and myself circulated through the crowd trying to get them to postpone the strike but without any success and when the vote was called it was unanimous for the strike, even the Northern Colorado delegates voting for it.

Agents sought to influence the portrayal of the strikers in the media, hoping thereby to control subsequent events. Since 1900, the Colorado National Guard had a history of crushing strikes. CF&I agents knew that the threat of violence might bring the guard into the field, thus hindering the strike at taxpayer expense. Agent "XX" described himself as a strike leader when interviewed by the media, apparently seeking to bolster the credibility of his ominous message:

The A-P and Denver Post reporters think I am a dyed-in-the-wool wobbly and have tried to interview me. In speaking about the alleged carload of arms and ammunition I did not deny this "hokum" but intimitated [sic] that if there was any violence it was against the principles of Svanum and myself and the more select class of "wobblies" but that there was an awfully rough element of "reds" coming into the field and that we might not be able to hold them in hand. Do not know if they are gullible enough to absorb this kind of stuff but can tell better when this afternoon[']s papers come out. If they play up strong that there is likely to be violence it might hasten action on part of state authorities.

A different view of the "alleged carload of arms and ammunition" is offered by historian Joanna Sampson:

It was curious that an organization like the IWW with its revolutionary philosophy and its reputation for violence conducted a major strike with so little violence. Miners afterward testified that members of the automobile caravans were searched by their own leaders to be sure they did not have liquor or firearms with them. In all the arrests of strikers for picketing, there is no case where a striker was accused of carrying firearms.

In fact the undercover agent got his wish for state intervention:

On November 21 [of 1927], state policemen killed six pickets and injured dozens more ... Despite the fact that the violence was the fault of the state police, Governor Adams used the so-called Columbine Massacre as an excuse to call out the National Guard to restore order throughout the state. With soldiers on guard at mine gates, mass picketing ceased and more and more miners returned to their jobs. The strike continued, but it lost considerable momentum.

Hogg explains that agents advocating, provoking, or using violence is a common scenario:

A detective will join the ranks of the strikers and at once become an ardent champion of their cause. He is next found committing an aggravated assault

upon some man or woman who has remained at work, thereby bringing down upon the heads of the officers and members of the assembly or union directly interested, the condemnation of all honest people, and aiding very materially to demoralize the organization and break their ranks. He is always on hand in the strikers' meeting to introduce some extremely radical measure to burn the mill or wreck a train, and when the meeting has adjourned he is ever ready to furnish the Associated Press with a full account of the proposed action, and the country is told that a "prominent and highly respected member" of the strikers' organization has just revealed a most daring plot to destroy life and property, but dare not become known in connection with the exposure for fear of his life!

===== Celebrated union organizers are not immune =====
Even ardent union organizers may yield to the temptation to spy on other unions during strikes, based perhaps upon misplaced sectarian loyalties or ideological differences. Mike Livoda of the United Mine Workers (UMWA) was one of the celebrated organizers from the Ludlow strike of 1913–14. Livoda was so revered by the mineworkers that he is the only individual buried at the Ludlow Monument. When Professor Eric Margolis was researching the 1927 Wobbly strike, he encountered evidence that Mike Livoda "actually hired out to spy on the Wobblies and provided the Governor of Colorado with advice on strike breaking tactics."

==== The United Mine Workers in Wyoming ====
The Union Pacific Coal Company in Wyoming hired the services of Thomas J. Williams, Pinkerton Operative "No. 15".

Whenever UMWA President Mitchell sent an organizer to Wyoming, Operative Williams introduced himself as "an old, good-standing member of the United Mine Workers," and offered to help the new fellow with his tasks. Operative Williams gladly arranged all the secret meetings with Wyoming miners. After approximately fifty secret meetings in a row were broken up by mine superintendents or foremen attending unannounced, causing prospective union members to scatter, the UMWA acknowledged defeat in Wyoming.

==== The United Mine Workers in Colorado ====
In 1903–04, the Pinkerton Agency had J. Frank Strong, operative "No. 28" in Fremont County, and Robert M. Smith, operative "No. 38" in Las Animas County. The two agents performed the same work—both had infiltrated the top ranks of the UMWA—yet they did not know each other. Because of this compartmentalization, the reports of these two operatives occasionally cite intelligence on each other.

The coal miners were unhappy about low wages paid in scrip. These were company-issued coupons redeemable only at the company store, where prices were exorbitant. The miners also wanted the eight-hour day, and the right to join a union. The UMWA declared a strike, and nearly all the coal miners in Colorado's Southern Field walked out.

The strike seemed destined to succeed. However, whenever the union sent an organizer to talk to miners, operative Strong would send that information to his Pinkerton handler. By chance, it seemed that groups of thugs would always obtain the same message. Morris Friedman, the former stenographer of the Pinkerton Agency in Colorado, reported:

As a result of Operative Smith's "clever and intelligent" work, a number of union organizers received severe beatings at the hands of unknown masked men, presumably in the employ of the company.

Friedman offers examples of these incidents:

About February 13, 1904, William Farley, of Alabama, a member of the [UMWA] National Executive Board ... and the personal representative of [UMWA] President Mitchell ... addressed coal miners' meetings ... [on their return trip] eight masked men held them up with revolvers, dragged them from their wagon, threw them to the ground, beat them, kicked them, and almost knocked them into insensibility.

And,

On Saturday, April 30, 1904, W.M. Wardjon, a national organizer of the United Mine Workers, while on board a train en route to Pueblo, was assaulted by three men at Sargents, about thirty miles west of Salida. Mr. Wardjon was beaten into unconsciousness.

Under repeated attack, the 1903–04 UMWA strike effort failed, with both leadership and membership despondent over the turn of events.

However, UMWA President Mitchell was determined to reverse the failure. He decided that one special position, that of national organizer, should be created to oversee all organizing efforts for the union. After considering a range of candidates, Mitchell selected for this vital position, Pinkerton Operative "No. 38," Robert M. Smith.

=== Union organizers turn tables on the company ===
In 1912, the United Mine Workers had discovered the extent to which CF&I relied upon spies, and union officials had learned their lesson well. The organization ended its efforts to form local unions. All membership cards were issued in secret, as members not of a local, but of the international union. Members did not know who had joined, and who had not. The company spy system was finally frustrated. Unaware that organizing was continuing, the two main coal operators in the Colorado Southern Coal Field, CF&I and the Victor-American Fuel company, believed they had won. Abusive practices which had been softened during the open organizing drives were revived. Revolt was in the air. Then the United Mine Workers announced a new organizing drive in letters sent to the newspapers. But this organizing drive would be different:

Twenty-one pairs of organizers were put through a special course in the Denver [UMWA] office and then sent into the Southern Field. Their operation was simple, but effective. One member of each team was known as the active organizer; the other was the passive organizer. The so-called active organizer moved into the open and was known to everyone ... as an organizer. His passive team-mate posed as a miner looking for work. He cussed the unions and their leadership, and obtained a job in the heavily guarded mines. He made friends with officers of the company and, where possible, hired out as a coal company spotter ... Once the passive organizer was installed in the mine, his active team mate sought new members in that mine. If a miner joined, the active organizer kept the man's membership secret and sent his card directly to the Denver office ... If a working miner refused to join, his name was sent to the passive organizer who immediately reported to the company that John Cotino had joined the union. The result was always the same. The company sent John Cotino packing ... In this manner a constant stream of anti-union and non-union men, the confirmed strike breakers and scabs, were kept streaming [out]. The companies unwittingly sent the faithful out, while the active organizer sent carefully coached men of union affiliation to apply for the jobs that had to be filled.

In one month, this system caused the coal operators to fire more than 3,000 non-union men. Their places were taken by 3,000 union men. In September 1913 a strike was called, and twelve thousand miners laid down their tools. Only with significant brutality would this new strike be defeated.

==== United States Chamber of Commerce plan thwarted ====
During the first week of February 2011, the Internet hacker cooperative Anonymous released e-mails which appear to show that the U.S. Chamber of Commerce, through their law firm, Hunton & Williams, contracted with three technology firms, including HBGary, Palantir Technologies, and Berico Technologies, to spy on and discredit unions and political opponents. Palantir received startup funds from the CIA in 2005. Release of the emails appears to have caused the parties to abort the attacks.

== Cases of labor spying ==
=== Wal-Mart surveillance of employees ===
In the book The Case Against Wal-Mart, author Al Norman cites many of the usual criticisms of the big box retail chain. He has written,

Wal-Mart is so terrified of union organizing, the company allegedly monitors some of its stores' phone calls and emails. Jon Lehman, a former Wal-Mart store manager, told Bloomberg news in February 2004 that Wal-Mart has a 60×60-foot room in Bentonville in which two dozen people with headsets conduct surveillance on calls and emails from stores, to see whether anyone is talking about union organizing.

Wal-Mart has responded that they monitor stores only if there is a risk of a bomb threat. But Norman believes "... there is no more explosive issue at Wal-Mart than the feared depth-charge of union sympathizers among its own workforce."

Wal-Mart's surveillance department has generated significant media attention. In a story headlined, "Wal-Mart gets gag order against ex-security worker," the Associated Press reported on April 10, 2007, that Wal-Mart succeeded in obtaining a gag order to prevent Bruce Gabbard, a former "security operative" for the company, from discussing the company with reporters. The article notes that there has been:

... a string of revelations about the retailer's large surveillance operations and its business plans ... The suit and restraining order were filed two days after Wal-Mart apologized to activist shareholders for Gabbard's revelation that they were considered potential threats and ahead of a story in Monday's editions of the Wall Street Journal on Gabbard's claim that Wal-Mart had a super-secret "Project Red" aimed at bolstering its stagnant share price.

Gabbard has alleged that "Wal-Mart had widespread surveillance operations against targets including shareholders, critics, suppliers, the board of directors and employees," and that "most of his spying activities were sanctioned by superiors." It has also been alleged that the corporation assigned a "long-haired employee" wearing a microphone to infiltrate a group that is critical of Wal-Mart. Wal-Mart used a surveillance van to monitor the organization from "the perimeter." Wal-Mart has characterized its security operations as normal.

== Agencies ==
Labor spy agencies included the Baldwin–Felts Detective Agency, Pinkerton National Detective Agency, William J. Burns International Detective Agency, Corporations Auxiliary Company, Sherman Service Company, Mooney and Boland, Thiel Detective Service Company, Berghoff and Waddell, and numerous others. Each of the named companies had branch offices in scores of American cities, frequently under disguised names.

One might question why labor spy agencies exist. A labor spy boss from Cleveland, who asserted c. 1920 that "I own every union in this town" (which is to say that he had control of the union executives), explains simply that many labor spies are ex-criminal detectives, and "[t]here's more money in industry than ever there was in crime."

=== Examples ===
These are agencies which have been known to supply operatives to corporations for the purpose of establishing or maintaining control over unionization efforts, beyond simply providing security services — former agencies, current agencies, and agencies that appear to have quit the business of union-busting:

Former agencies
- Baldwin–Felts Detective Agency (mining regions of West Virginia and Colorado)
- Bergoff Service Bureau
- Labor Relations Associates (formed in Chicago in 1939, dissolved in scandal in 1961 after McClellan Committee investigation)
- Mooney and Boland (on the West Coast)
- Railway Audit and Inspection Company
- Thiel Detective Service Company (offices in St. Louis, New York, Chicago, Kansas City, St. Paul, and Portland)
Current agencies
- Alternative Workforce, Inc., Troy, Michigan
- Asset Protection Team, subsidiary of Vance International, Oakton, Virginia
- Huffmaster Associates, Troy, Michigan
- Pinkerton National Detective Agency
- Special Response Corporation, Hunt Valley, Maryland
- U.S. Nursing Corporation, http://www.usnursing.com/
Agencies once in the business
- Securitas AB represents the merger of several firms, including Pinkerton National Detective Agency and the William J. Burns International Detective Agency. In spite of Pinkerton's lengthy union-busting history, Securitas AB appears to no longer participate in such activities.

== See also ==
- Anti-union violence
- Charles Lively (labor spy)
- History of union busting in the United States
- Industrial espionage
- Union busting
- Damnation (TV series)
