= Corporations Auxiliary Company =

Corporations Auxiliary Company was an American corporation created to conduct "the administration of industrial espionage" in the United States.

Corporations Auxiliary Company masqueraded under a dozen different names. It specialized at electing its agents to union office in order to control or destroy unions; providing labor spies who could propagandize, sabotage, or act as goons in exchange for payment.

In 1921, the New York World reported that Corporations Auxiliary Company issued "a bi-weekly bulletin of labor Information gathered by undercover methods in every State in the country."

An investigation revealed that the Steel Corporation of Pennsylvania possessed worker blacklists, as well as reports from two labor detective agencies, including Corporations Auxiliary Company. In the period 1933 to 1936, Corporations Auxiliary Company had 499 corporate clients.

== Spying and propaganda practices ==
In 1921, Corporations Auxiliary Company had offices in New York, Chicago, Cleveland, Pittsburgh, St. Louis, Cincinnati, Detroit and Buffalo. The company employed approximately 2000 undercover operatives in various industries, including the steel industry and the coal industry.

Operatives reported to a home office, but generally were not aware of other operatives. Many of the operatives, as well as their fellow workers, were immigrants. The company claimed a history of "studying" workers for 25 years, including what the company described as disseminating "constructive propaganda" aimed at avoiding "troubles, strikes, disputes and [to] help everybody get a square deal." Operatives were taught to "spread the gospel of good cheer, harmony, contentment, confidence and satisfaction among the men with whom you work. In other words, assist you to become propagandists of progress and well-being for the sake of the company, the men and yourself." Operatives were trained to teach other workers "[w]hy high wages are not what they seem" and that "the manufacturer and his employee ... are in precisely the same boat," in that higher wages would increase prices, and higher prices would eat up wage increases. Workers were taught that "cooperation is the key to prosperity. You can never hope to better yourself by cutting down production or by restricting output."

By such methods Corporations Auxiliary Company propagandized the workers that "side by shoulder, capital and labor learned that each had much of good before unnoticed. They found honesty with each other brought trust between them." Operatives were instructed to monitor and to "enter" any sort of union activity, to "work into labor and control it with sensible ideas founded on economic fact... We expect eventually to control the unions, which have fallen into radical hands in the last few years. We work to control labor to lead it in the right direction, away from radicalism..."

"Now, for instance, this is how we work. We might do this in Wheeling for example. We might have 40 to 50 men there in different trades, working in from all angles. We could expect 10 or 15 of them to reach positions of influence in local unions. Five or more would become union officials. We might expect in that way to have men as international officers or even members of the State Federation of Labor."

A company executive stated that "the Corporations Auxiliary had men who were officers of international unions"; and that "a member of the steel strike national committee was their man," but offered this only as a hypothetical example of what they might accomplish. He also claimed that "when the A. F. of L. organizer comes to Akron he reports to our man."

== Business model ==
In 1903, Corporations Auxiliary Company, which operated out of the Chamber of Commerce building in Cleveland, sent a letter signed by that company's vice president to the D.R. Whiton Machine Company of New London, Connecticut, offering to supply labor spies for that company. Corporations Auxiliary Company reported that it was able to furnish "workmen of all classes for various corporations" who would "work and live and act with the working men of their establishments, and to keep employers in complete touch with all movements among the men, to give advance information of labor disturbances, and to make possible the discharge of aggressive agitators before their objects have been accomplished."

The letter declared that Corporations Auxiliary Company had paid representatives in labor unions, "high up in their confidence," reporting to employers, and in some cases controlling the unions. The company offered to furnish "union or non-union men, American Federation of Labor men, or any other class of men desired. Other services could not be written down, the letter stated, but a phone call would follow. The letter stated,

The Corporations Auxiliary Company, through its system of industrial inspection, is prepared to keep a manufacturer closely and continuously advised of conditions in his own particular plant, of breakage and leakage, of agitation and organization, of the dissatisfaction and discontent, if any, that exists, and of the feeling of the workmen at all times, making it possible to give promotion strictly on merit, eradicate any discontent or abuse, and render it easier to establish and maintain a constant harmonious relation between himself and his employes [sic], thus assisting in preventing strikes and all labor difficulties. This system is not an experiment, but has become recognized in many factories, railroads, &c., as a necessity, as much so as insurance.

In a subsequent phone call from the General Manager of Corporations Auxiliary Company, a representative stated that some of the informants currently operating in existing businesses were officers of unions, and delegates to labor conventions, both state and national, and on official union boards.

The General Manager state that he had been in the business for seventeen years. Any particular operation would be tailored to the "interests and desires of their clients, from breaking up unions to simply running them quietly and avoiding trouble."

Corporations Auxiliary Company also obtained advance notice through their spy network of proposed labor legislation, such that it could be promptly and efficiently opposed. In this particular instance, however, the letters and phone call reached Lucius E. Whiton of D.R. Whiton Machine Company, who took offense at the secret nature of such a business, and published a pamphlet at his own expense to alert others to the offered practices.

== Union busting methods ==
In a 1913 account, Harry Wellington Laidler recorded how Corporations Auxiliary Company offered employers,

"...all the information about what the men do and say in the plant, who are union men, who are the radical ones and the agitators in the shop, so that their work can be killed by dispensing with their services the minute you learn who they are."

Corporations Auxiliary Company would explain to employers how the process worked:

"Our man will come to your factory and get acquainted. He will be a machinist, as most of our men belong to the machinists' union. If he finds little disposition to organize, he will not encourage organization, but will engineer things so as to keep organization out. If, however, there seems a disposition to organize he will become the leading spirit and pick out just the right men to join. Once the union is in the field its members can keep it from growing if they know how, and our man knows how. Meetings can be set far apart. A contract can at once be entered into with the employer, covering a long period, and made very easy in its terms. However, these tactics may not be good, and the union spirit may be so strong that a big organization cannot be prevented. In this case our man turns extremely radical. He asks for unreasonable things and keeps the union embroiled in trouble. If a strike comes, he will be the loudest man in the bunch, and will counsel violence and get somebody in trouble. The result will be that the union will be broken up."
