= Pinkerton (detective agency) =

American private investigation company

- Type: Subsidiary
- Industry: Private police
- Founded: c. 1850; 176 years ago, Chicago, Illinois, U.S.
- Founder: Allan Pinkerton
- Headquarters: Ann Arbor, Michigan, U.S.
- Area served: Worldwide
- Services: Security management, risk management consulting, investigations, employment screening, protective services, security, crisis management, intelligence services
- Parent: Securitas AB (1999–present)
- Website: pinkerton.com

Pinkerton is an American private investigation agency and security company established around 1850 in the United States by Scottish-born American cooper Allan Pinkerton and Chicago attorney Edward Rucker as the North-Western Police Agency, which later became Pinkerton & Co. and finally the Pinkerton National Detective Agency. At the height of its power from the 1870s to the 1890s, it was the largest private law enforcement organization in the world. It is currently a subsidiary of Swedish-based Securitas AB.

Pinkerton became famous when he claimed to have foiled the Baltimore Plot to assassinate President-elect Abraham Lincoln in 1861. Later, Lincoln's general-in-chief, George B. McClellan, hired Pinkerton to conduct espionage against the Confederacy and provide Confederate troop estimates during the American Civil War. For this reason, Pinkerton and his agency are sometimes seen as the forerunners of the United States Secret Service.

Following the Civil War, the Pinkertons began conducting operations against organized labor. During the labor strikes of the late 19th and early 20th centuries, businesses hired the Pinkerton Agency to infiltrate unions, supply guards, keep strikers and suspected unionists out of factories, and recruit goon squads to intimidate workers. During the Homestead Strike of 1892, Pinkerton agents were called in to reinforce the strikebreaking measures of industrialist Henry Clay Frick, who was acting on behalf of Andrew Carnegie, the head of Carnegie Steel. Tensions between the workers and strikebreakers erupted into violence, which led to the deaths of three Pinkerton agents and nine steelworkers. During the late 19th century, the Pinkertons were also hired as guards in coal, iron, and lumber disputes in Illinois, Michigan, New York, Pennsylvania, and West Virginia and were involved in other strikes such as the Great Railroad Strike of 1877.

During the 20th century, Pinkerton rebranded itself as a personal security and risk management firm. The company has continued to exist in various forms to the present day; it is now a division of the Swedish security company Securitas AB, operating as Pinkerton Consulting & Investigations, Inc., doing business as Pinkerton Corporate Risk Management. The former Pinkerton Government Services division, PGS, now operates as Securitas Critical Infrastructure Services, Inc.

== Origins ==
In the 1850s, Allan Pinkerton, a Scottish immigrant, met Chicago attorney Edward Rucker in a local Masonic Hall. The two men formed the North-Western Police Agency, later known as the Pinkerton Agency. Pinkerton used his skills in espionage to attract clients and begin expanding the agency. Historian Frank Morn writes: "By the mid-1850s, a few businessmen saw the need for greater control over their employees; their solution was to sponsor a private detective system. In February 1855, Allan Pinkerton, after consulting with six midwestern railroads, created such an agency in Chicago." The Pinkerton Agency began to hire women and minorities shortly after its founding because they were useful as spies, a practice uncommon at the time.

== Forerunners to the Secret Service ==
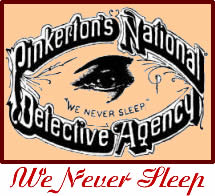
"We Never Sleep" logo

Among the business's early operations was to safely deliver the newly elected President of the United States, Abraham Lincoln, from Springfield to Washington, D.C., in light of an assassination threat. Pinkerton detective Kate Warne was assigned and successfully delivered Lincoln to the U.S. capital city through a series of disguises and related tactics that required her to stay awake throughout the entire long journey. As a result of the notability of this success, the business adopted an open eye as its logo and the slogan "We never sleep". Allan Pinkerton around this time also served in the "Secret Service" intelligence division of what was then known as the U.S. War Department.

These actions preceded and laid the groundwork for the establishment of the United States Secret Service, which is tasked with serving current and former U.S. Presidents' security to this day. The official Secret Service was founded on July 5, 1865, less than three months after the assassination of Abraham Lincoln. However, the Secret Service initially began as an investigative arm of the Department of the Treasury, with their original responsibility focusing on counterfeit money. The Secret Service began providing security for US presidents part-time 1894, following the discovery of an assassination attempt against Grover Cleveland while investigating smuggling operations. It wasn't until 1901, following the assassination of William McKinley, 36 years after the assassination of Lincoln, that the Secret Service began providing security for presidents full time.

== U.S. government contractor ==
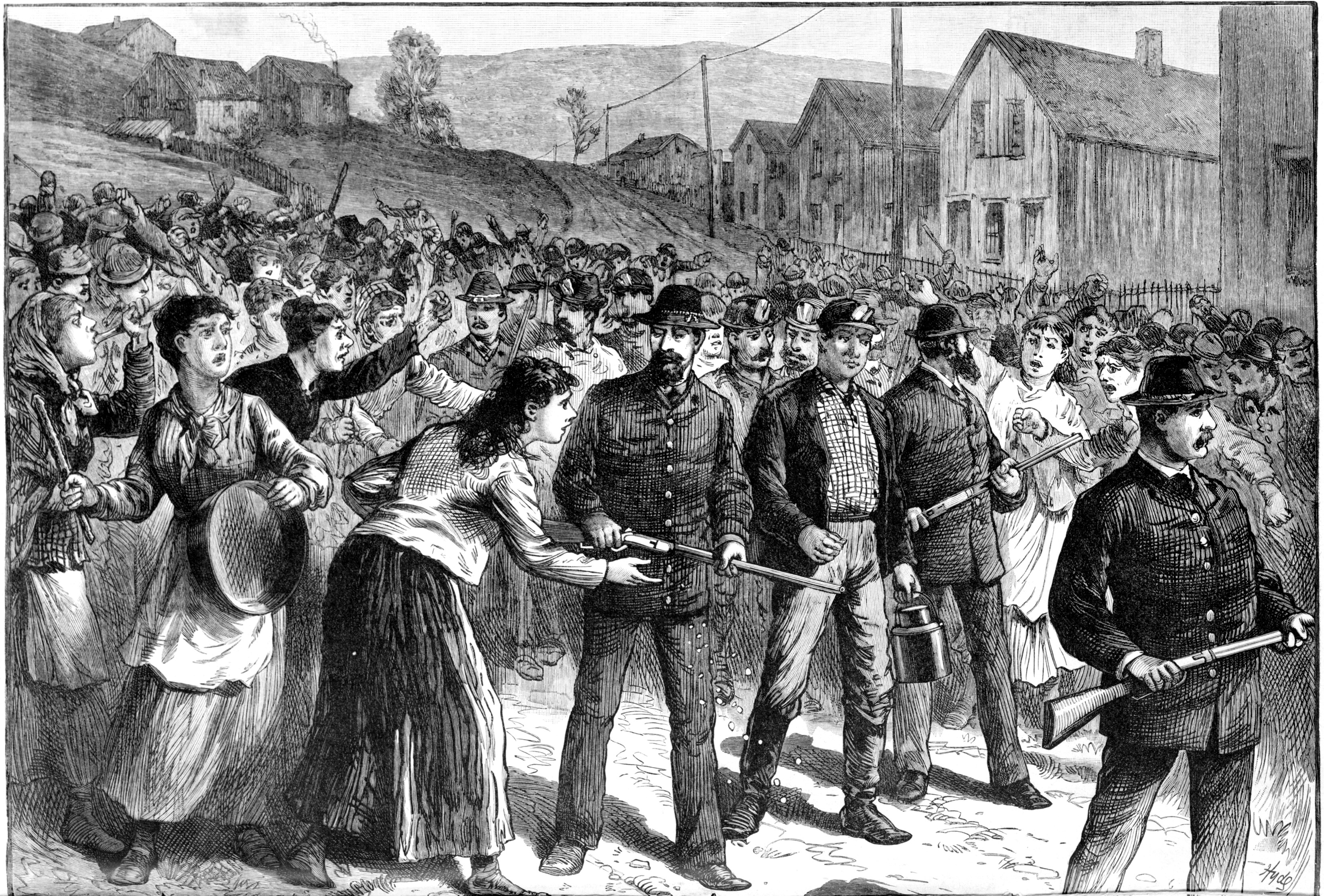
Pinkerton guards escort strikebreakers in Buchtel, Ohio, 1884

In 1871, Congress appropriated $50,000 (equivalent to $1,344,000 in 2025) to the new Department of Justice to form a suborganization devoted to "the detection and prosecution of those guilty of violating federal law." The amount was insufficient to form an internal investigating unit, so they contracted the services to the Pinkerton National Detective Agency.

As news leaked about the Pinkertons' involvement in strikebreaking, lawmakers began pushing against government contracts with the Pinkertons. The Pinkertons reached their zenith in the 1870s and 80s, which had them frequently engage in violent crackdowns against striking workers. The most notable example of this was the involvement of the Pinkertons in the Great Railroad Strike of 1877. The confrontation in Homestead, Pennsylvania, in 1892, however, led to a national outcry against the Pinkerton Detective Agency. Following the strike, Congress took swift action against the Pinkertons and passed the Anti-Pinkerton Act in 1893, which severely curtailed the relationship between the federal government and the agency. The act states that "individuals employed by the Pinkerton Detective Agency, or similar organization, may not be employed by the government of the United States or the government of the District of Columbia."

== Molly Maguires ==
In the 1870s, Franklin B. Gowen, then president of the Philadelphia and Reading Railroad, hired the agency to investigate the labor unions in the company's mines. A Pinkerton agent, James McParland, using the alias "James McKenna", infiltrated the Molly Maguires, a 19th-century secret society of mainly Irish-American coal miners, leading to the downfall of the organization.

The incident inspired Arthur Conan Doyle's Sherlock Holmes novel The Valley of Fear (1914–1915). A Pinkerton agent also appears in a small role in "The Adventure of the Red Circle", a 1911 Holmes story. A 1970 film, The Molly Maguires, was loosely based on the incident.

== Homestead strike ==
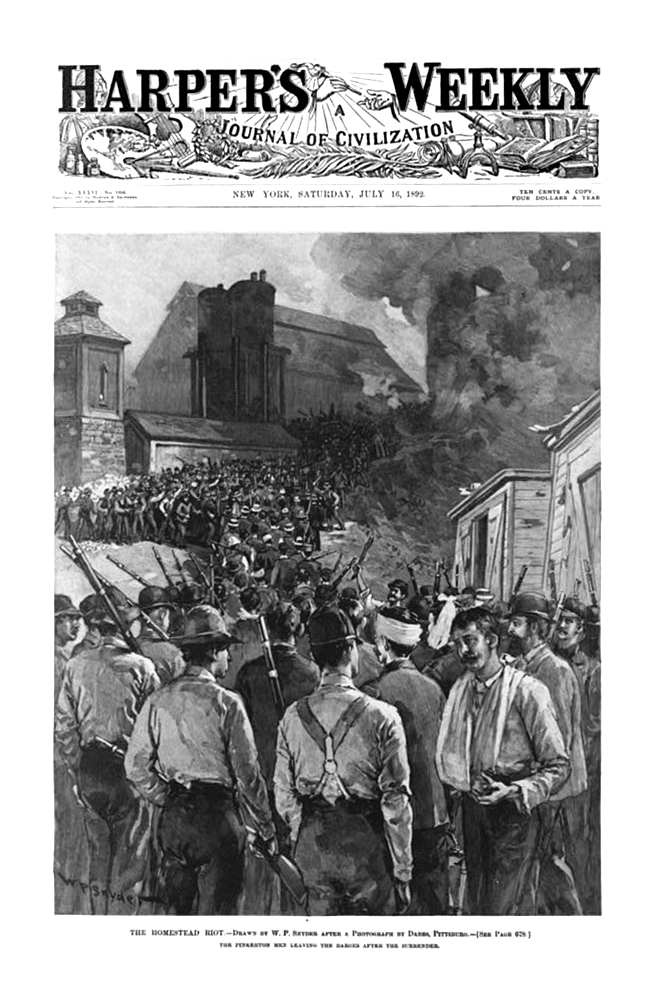
Pinkerton men leaving a barge after their surrender during the Homestead Strike

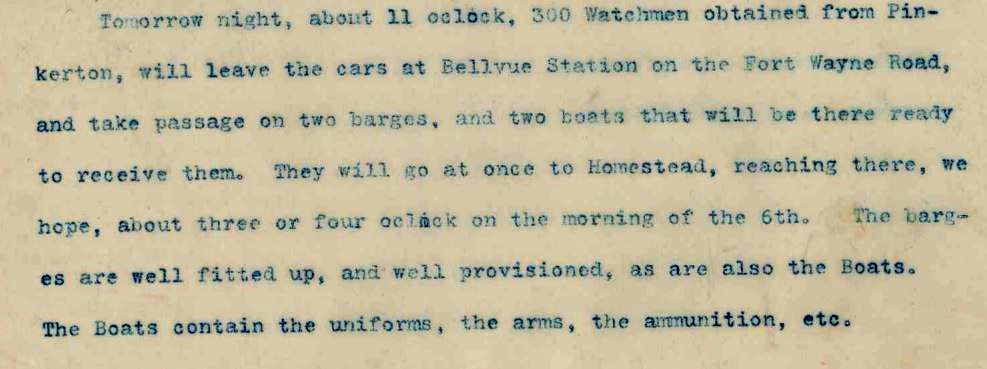
Frick's letter describing the plans and munitions that will be on the barges when the Pinkertons arrive to confront the strikers in Homestead

On July 6, 1892, during the Homestead Strike, 300 Pinkerton agents from New York City and Chicago were called in by Carnegie Steel's Henry Clay Frick to protect the Pittsburgh-area mill and act as strikebreakers. This resulted in a firefight and siege in which 16 men were killed and 23 others were wounded. Following the confrontation, the governor of Pennsylvania, Robert E. Pattison, mobilized state law enforcement and the National Guard. Private and government forces broke the strike, and workers returned to the steel mill.

The Homestead Strike, dubbed "the Battle of Homestead" by local media, caused outrage across the country for the mistreatment of strikers. The event is regarded as a turning point in American labor history, prompting Congress to begin a crackdown on the Pinkertons. As a legacy of the Pinkertons' involvement, a bridge connecting the nearby Pittsburgh suburbs of Munhall and Rankin was named Pinkerton's Landing Bridge.

== Steunenberg murder and trial ==
Harry Orchard was arrested by the Idaho police and confessed to Pinkerton agent James McParland that he assassinated former Governor Frank Steunenberg of Idaho in 1905. Orchard testified (unsuccessfully), under threat of hanging, against Western Federation of Miners (WFM) president Big Bill Haywood, naming him as having hired the hit. With a stirring defense by Clarence Darrow, Haywood and the other defendants of the WFM were acquitted in a nationally publicized trial. Orchard received a death sentence, but it was commuted.

== Outlaws and competition ==
Pinkerton agents were hired to track western outlaws Jesse James, the Reno Gang, and the Wild Bunch (including Butch Cassidy and the Sundance Kid). On March 17, 1874, two Pinkerton detectives and a deputy sheriff, Edwin P. Daniels, encountered the Younger brothers (associates of the James–Younger Gang) in Roscoe, Missouri; Daniels, John Younger, and one Pinkerton agent were killed. In Union, Missouri, a bank was robbed by George Collins (or Fred Lewis) and Bill Randolph; Pinkerton Detective Chas Schumacher trailed them and was killed. Collins was hanged on March 26, 1904, and Randolph on May 8, 1905, in Union. Pinkertons were also hired to transport money and other high-quality merchandise between cities and towns, which made them vulnerable to outlaws. Pinkerton agents were usually well paid and well armed.

George Thiel, a former Pinkerton employee, established the Thiel Detective Service Company in St. Louis, Missouri, a competitor to the Pinkerton agency. The agency operated in the U.S., Canada, and Mexico.

== Modern era ==
During the 1930s, the Ford Motor Company used Pinkertons to break unions at its Ford River Rouge complex, notoriously during the Battle of the Overpass.

Due to its conflicts with labor unions, the word "Pinkerton" continues to be associated by labor organizers and union members with strikebreaking. Pinkerton diversified from labor spying following revelations publicized by the La Follette Committee hearings in 1937, and the firm's criminal detection work also suffered from the police modernization movement, which saw the rise of the Federal Bureau of Investigation and the bolstering of detective branches and resources of the public police. With less of the labor and criminal investigation work on which Pinkertons thrived for decades, the company became increasingly involved in protection services, and in the 1960s, even the word "detective" disappeared from the agency's letterhead. The company now focuses on threat intelligence, risk management, executive protection, and active-shooter response.

In 1999, the company was bought by Securitas AB, a Swedish security company, for $384 million, followed by the acquisition of the William J. Burns Detective Agency (founded in 1910), a longtime Pinkerton rival, to create (as a division of the parent) Securitas Security Services USA. Today, the company's headquarters are located in Ann Arbor, Michigan.

In December 2018, Securitas AB issued a cease-and-desist notice to video game company Take-Two Interactive over the use of the Pinkerton name and badge imagery in Red Dead Redemption 2. They demanded royalties for each copy of the game sold, or they would take legal action. Take-Two maintained that the Pinkerton name was strongly associated with the Wild West, and its use of the term did not infringe on the Pinkerton trademark. By April 2019, Securitas AB had withdrawn its claim.

In 2020, they were hired by Amazon to spy on warehouse workers for signs of union activity. In 2022, Starbucks reportedly had hired a former Pinkerton employee as part of their union-busting efforts.

In 2020, Matthew Dolloff, an unlicensed security guard contracted through Pinkerton, shot and killed Lee Keltner, a conservative protester, in Denver, Colorado. Dolloff had been contracted by Pinkerton to guard a camera crew working for 9News. The camera crew had been assigned to cover rival political groups protesting in Denver. Keltner had told a cameraman to stop filming him; Dolloff then approached Keltner. Keltner slapped Dolloff before spraying him with bear spray, and moments later, Dolloff shot Keltner. Dolloff was arrested, investigated for first-degree murder, and charged with second-degree murder. The charge was later dropped.

In 2023, Wizards of the Coast hired Pinkerton to seize products from the March of the Machine: The Aftermath card set for the trading card game Magic: The Gathering from YouTuber Dan Cannon of oldschoolmtg. Cannon had published a video on YouTube showing the contents of an order received ahead of the release date from a local game store. Pinkerton used intimidation and legal servings to force compliance. This action was met with widespread criticism and condemnation. The game's players subsequently initiated a boycott in response.

== In popular culture ==
=== Books ===
In the Whyborne and Griffin book series, Griffin Flaherty is an ex-Pinkerton Detective.

In Thomas Pynchon’s novel Vineland (1990), Eula Becker (the grandmother of Frenesi Gates, a main character) vividly recalls being shot at by Pinkertons at an early 20th-century May Day picnic outside of Hollywood.

=== Radio ===
- CBS Radio Mystery Theater, "The Pinkerton Method", episode #745 (1977)

=== Video games ===
- In the game Red Dead Redemption 2, the Pinkerton Detective Agency plays a pivotal role as an antagonistic faction. Bankrolled by the wealthy yet corrupt industrialist Leviticus Cornwall, they begin hunting down the Van der Linde gang after they rob one of Cornwall’s trains. Two of its members are central antagonists, Andrew Milton and Edgar Ross—the main antagonist of Red Dead Redemption. This portrayal was the subject of a lawsuit from the agency through its parent company Securitas AB against the developers, which was dismissed under artistic liberties.
- In Bioshock Infinite, protagonist Booker DeWitt is a former Pinkerton Agent. In-game documents show his employment issued on January 22, 1892.

== Public records ==
In 2000, the Pinkerton agency donated its confidential files about notorious 19th-century and early 20th-century bandits Jesse James, Butch Cassidy, and the Sundance Kid to the Library of Congress, making it available to the public. It included the only known photo of Etta Place, information about the lynched William Rudolph ("The Missouri Kid"), and photos of Abraham Lincoln made by the Pinkerton family. According to the archivist Jane Adler in charge of organizing the donation, Pinkerton's archive "had been neglected as the company changed hands several times in recent decades [...] Some papers had disintegrated nearly to powder."

== See also ==
- Anti-union organizations in the United States
- Anti-union violence
- Baldwin–Felts Detective Agency
- Battle of Blair Mountain
- Coal and Iron Police, a Pinkerton-supervised former private police force in Pennsylvania
- Colorado Labor Wars
- Dashiell Hammett, author and former Pinkerton operative
- Frank Little, American labor leader; lynched in 1917, allegedly by Pinkerton agents
- George S. Dougherty, a leading private detective for the Pinkerton National Detective Agency from 1888 to 1911
- Industrial Workers of the World
- Labor spying in the United States
- List of worker deaths in United States labor disputes
- Morris Friedman, author of Pinkerton Labor Spy
- Pinkerton (1996), an album by the American rock band Weezer temporarily held from release by the detective agency
- Timothy Webster, Pinkerton agent who served as a Union spy in the American Civil War
