= Silver Mountain (Idaho) =

Ski resort in Kellogg, Idaho

- Location in Idaho Silver Mountain (the United States)
- Location: Kellogg, Idaho, U.S.
- Nearest city: Coeur d'Alene: 35 mi (56 km); Spokane: 68 mi (110 km)
- Coordinates: 47.495°N 116.135°W
- Vertical: 2,197 ft (670 m)
- Top elevation: 6,297 ft (1,919 m); Kellogg Peak
- Base elevation: 4,100 ft (1,250 m) lowest chairlift - (#4); 5,650 ft (1,722 m); Mountain Haus (gondola summit & lodge); 2,300 ft (701 m) (gondola base & village)
- Skiable area: 1,600 acres (6.5 km^{2})
- Trails: 67: 20% beginner; 40% intermediate; 30% advanced; 10% expert
- Longest run: Centennial Trail; 2.5 miles (4.0 km)
- Lift system: 1 gondola 1 quad chairlift 2 triples 2 doubles 1 surface tows
- Snowfall: 300 in (760 cm)
- Snowmaking: planned
- Night skiing: 8 runs - (chair #2); 50 acres (0.20 km^{2})
- Website: silvermt.com

Silver Mountain Resort is a ski resort in the northwest United States, located in the Silver Valley region of northern Idaho, just south of Kellogg and Interstate 90 in Shoshone County. Originally opened as "Jackass Ski Bowl" in January 1968 on Wardner Peak, it was renamed "Silverhorn" in 1973 following an ownership change. With planned improvements, most notably the gondola from the city of Kellogg and expansion on Kellogg Peak, the name was changed to "Silver Mountain" in the summer of 1989.

== History ==
=== Jackass Ski Bowl ===
Jackass Ski Bowl, near Wardner, was constructed 59 years ago in the summer of 1967 on lands leased from the Bunker Hill Mining Company. It was named for Noah Kellogg's borrowed ore-discovering donkey (Jenny) of 1885. The ski area began operations in January 1968 and the first seasons were promising, with plans for lift expansion, and a 1971 season that extended to mid-May. But the next two years of poor skiing weather caused the operation to fall into financial difficulty. Following its sixth season, its assets were liquidated in a foreclosure sale by the SBA in August 1973 in Wallace, and were purchased by the Bunker Hill Co. for $100,100.

=== Silverhorn ===
The ski facility was reorganized as Silverhorn ski area in 1973 under the ownership of Shoshone Recreation, Inc., a wholly owned subsidiary of Bunker Hill. Named after Silberhorn in the Bernese Alps, it was offered for sale in 1982, and was acquired by the City of Kellogg in 1984. It operated only on weekends and holidays during the 1986–87 season.

Falling prices for metals in 1980, combined with environmental problems, forced many of the mines to curtail production. The century-old Bunker Hill mine and smelter operations, which had experienced a turbulent early history of labor disputes, finally closed in 1981. ASARCO, Hecla, and Sunshine soon followed, resulting in the direct loss of thousands of high-wage jobs, and the indirect loss of many others, with serious economic hardship to the Silver Valley area of Shoshone County.

Kellogg (and the Silver Valley) is the site of one of the largest EPA Superfund sites. Enormous efforts over that past few years have resulted in restoration of the area. Restoration means returning a natural resource back to a healthy condition.

To diversify and expand the local economy, an increased focus was placed on recreation and tourism, primarily through the existing ski area. Silverhorn had one lift, a double chair (later renamed #4, then Jackass) with a vertical drop of 1,875 feet (572 m), and a mid-mountain loading/unloading area at the parking lot & day lodge. Silverhorn was accessed by vehicle via a difficult and dangerous twisting mountain road, which climbed over 2,700 feet (820 m) in just seven miles (11 km), an average grade of over seven percent. The road approached from the northwest and terminated in the parking lot at 5,040 ft (1,540 m), the mid-mountain base area of Wardner Peak. If the ski area was to attract more visitors, a better way of reaching the mountain was definitely needed.

In December 1987, the U.S. Congress approved an appropriation bill for the U.S. Forest Service which included $6.4 million of matching funds to assist in the construction of a new gondola from the city of Kellogg to Silverhorn. The bill was greatly assisted by the members of Idaho's congressional delegation.

In September 1988, tiny and economically depressed Kellogg voted to tax itself $2 million ($100,000 per year for 20 years), approved by over 82%, and Von Roll Tramways, a Swiss lift manufacturing company, was impressed enough to agree to guarantee much of the remaining funds needed to construct the improved resort. The state government of Idaho and the local electric utility (Washington Water Power, now Avista Corp.) also assisted.

=== Silver Mountain ===
On April 25, 1989, ground was broken for the construction of the gondola and base village, additional chairlifts, and other resort improvements. Renamed Silver Mountain in July, it opened for summer operations in June 1990, and for skiing that November. The elevation at the bottom terminal of the gondola is slightly under 2,300 feet (700 m) and unloads at about 5,650 feet (1,720 m); the 3.1-mile (5.0 km) trip takes seventeen minutes, traveling south-southeast over Wardner.

Gondola and chairlift rides, mountain biking, hiking, and concerts at the high-mountain outdoor amphitheater (capacity: 2500) are the primary summer activities at Silver Mountain. The base village and gondola base are located less than a half-mile (800 m) from exit #49 of Interstate 90.

In 1996, Silver Mountain was acquired by Eagle Crest Partners, a subsidiary of Jeld-Wen Corporation.

A snow tubing park was constructed in the fall of 2006 at the site of the mountain amphitheater, which was relocated and expanded. An indoor water park (Silver Rapids) opened in May 2008. The excitement surrounding the favorable snow conditions and summer activities—biking, ATV riding, hiking, fishing, swimming, hunting, golf, bird watching—prompted economic growth. The economic downturn in 2008 has created opportunity again for investment.

In 2016, Jeld-Wen sold the resort to Seattle-area businessman Tryg Fortun for $5 million. The ownership group, CMR Lands LLC, acquired a second ski area in 2019: 49 Degrees North in northeastern Washington, north of Spokane.

In 2020, an avalanche on Wardner Peak killed three and injured four; it occurred in the late morning on "16 to 1" on Tuesday, January 7.

== Mountain statistics ==
Silver Mountain is actually two mountains: Kellogg Peak, to the east, with a summit of 6,300 feet (1,920 m) and the original Wardner Peak at 6,200 ft (1,890 m). The ski area has a vertical drop of 2,200 ft (671 m) on its north-facing slopes. There are 81 named trails on its 1,600 acres (6.5 km^{2}) plus of ski-able area with extensive off-piste terrain. The terrain is rated at 20% beginner, 40% intermediate, 30% advanced, and 10% expert.

The ski area has seven lifts: one gondola (service to the base village and parking lot in Kellogg), five chairlifts (1 quad, 2 triples, 2 doubles), and a magic carpet).

Its average annual snowfall is 239 inches (610 cm), with limited snowmaking on 35 acres (0.14 km^{2}).

== The future ==
The master plan of Silver Mountain proposes:

• An expanded Gondola Village with new shops, meeting facilities, restaurants, entertainment plaza.

• New high-speed chairlifts and snowmaking system and new trails with increased vertical drop (by lowering the base).
