= 49 Degrees North Ski Area =

Ski area in Washington, United States

49° North
- Location in Washington 49° North (the United States)
- Location: Colville National Forest; Stevens County, Washington
- Nearest major city: Chewelah: 10 mi (16 km); Spokane: 52 mi (84 km)
- Coordinates: 48.301°N 117.563°W
- Vertical: 1,851 ft (564 m)
- Top elevation: 5,774 ft (1,760 m)
- Base elevation: 3,923 ft (1,196 m)
- Skiable area: 2,325 acres (9.4 km^{2})
- Trails: 82 – 30% easiest – 40% more difficult – 25% most difficult – 5% experts only
- Longest run: 2.75 miles (4.4 km)
- Lift system: 6 chairs: 2 quad, 4 double
- Lift capacity: 6,600 per hr
- Terrain parks: 2
- Snowfall: 301 inches (760 cm)
- Snowmaking: yes
- Night skiing: limited
- Website: ski49n.com

49 Degrees North Ski Area is a ski resort in the northwestern United States, located inside Colville National Forest in Stevens County, Washington, ten miles (16 km) east of Chewelah, which is 42 miles (68 km) north of Spokane.

The base is at an elevation of 3,923 feet (1,196 m) above sea level with the summit at 5,774 feet (1,760 m) on Chewelah Mountain, yielding a vertical drop of 1,851 feet (564 m). Its slopes are primarily north-facing and are served by six chairlifts - one quad, one high-speed detachable quad, and four doubles.

The ski area first opened in late 1972 with three chairlifts. It is actually at 48.3° North, about fifty miles (80 km) south of the 49th parallel, the international border with Canada. Following two consecutive winters of poor weather, the ski area filed for Chapter 11 bankruptcy in June 1990.

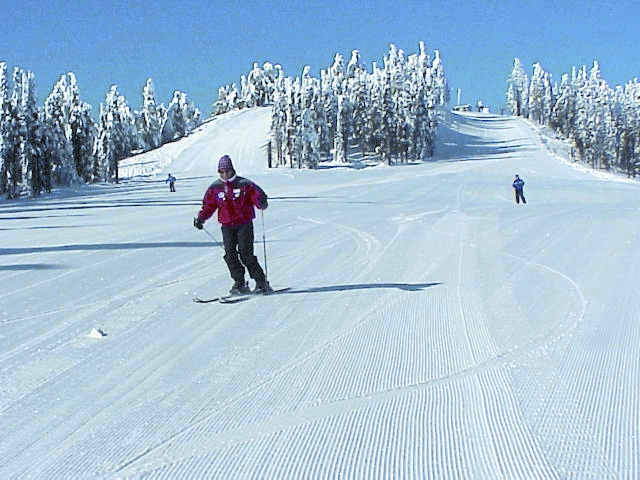

Six years later in June 1996, John Eminger, a local, purchased the ski area and acted as owner operator for the next 23 years. In the 1990s, the trees were thinned over most of its 2,300 acres (9.3 km^{2}), providing some of the greatest variation and magnitude of tree skiing found at a single resort in the northwest United States. The resort will soon be implementing mountain biking.

A predecessor ski area named "Chewelah Peak" was about two miles (3 km) west (48.302°N 117.612°W), towards Chewelah. It was served by a double chair that vertically climbed 1,450 feet (440 m). It began operation with a rope tow in 1936; the double chairlift was added in 1950, and a lodge in 1952.

In the spring of 2019, the ski area was sold to CMR Lands LLC, headed by Seattle-area businessman Tryg Fortun. The group also owns Silver Mountain in Kellogg, Idaho, purchased three years earlier in 2016. In 2021, the resort installed a base to summit high speed detachable quad chairlift. Northern Spirit, built by Doppelmayr USA, is the newest, longest, and most powerful chairlift in the State of Washington and the Inland Northwest, surpassed only by Crystal Mountain and Silver Mountain's Gondolas.
