= Coeur d'Alene miners' dispute =

1892–1899 miners' strikes in Idaho, United States

There were two related incidents between miners and mine owners in the Coeur d'Alene Mining District of North Idaho: the Coeur d'Alene, Idaho labor strike of 1892, and the Coeur d'Alene, Idaho labor confrontation of 1899. This article is a brief overview of both events.

The strike of 1892 had its roots in the first pay cut by the Bunker Hill Mining Company in 1887. Immediately after the reduction in wages miners organized the first union at Wardner on November 3, 1887.
The response to that violence, disastrous for the local miners' union, became the primary motivation for the formation of the Western Federation of Miners (WFM) the following year.

The confrontation of 1899 resulted from the miners' frustrations with mine operators that paid lower wages; hired Pinkerton or Thiel operatives to infiltrate the union; and routinely fired any miner who held a union card.

== Coeur d'Alene strike of 1892 ==
Coeur d'Alene, Idaho area miners organized into several local unions during the 1880s. Mine owners responded by forming a Mine Owners' Association. Mine operators found a reduction in wages the easiest way to mitigate increased costs. The operators also increased miners' work hours from nine to ten hours per day, with no corresponding increase in pay.

In 1892, the miners declared a strike against the reduction of wages and an increase in work hours. Soon every inbound train was filled with replacement workers. But groups of armed, striking miners would frequently meet them, and often persuaded the workers not to take the jobs during a strike.

The silver-mine owners responded by hiring Pinkertons and the Thiel Detective Agency agents to infiltrate the union and suppress strike activity. Two mines settled and opened with union men, and these mine operators were ostracized by other mine owners who didn't want the union. But two large nonunion mines, the Gem mine and the Frisco mine in Burke-Canyon, were operating full scale.

An undercover Pinkerton agent, soon-to-be well-known lawman Charlie Siringo, had worked in the Gem mine. Siringo began to report all union business to his employers. Siringo was suspected as a spy when the MOA's newspaper, the Coeur d'Alene Barbarian, began publishing union secrets.

On Sunday night, July 10, there was gunfire at the Frisco mine. The miners claimed the guards fired first, the guards accused the miners. The union men eventually sent a box of black powder down the flume into one of the mine buildings. The building exploded, killing one company man and injuring several others. The union miners fired into a remaining structure where the guards had taken shelter. A second company man was killed, and sixty or so guards surrendered. Union men marched their prisoners to the union hall.

Minutes after the explosion at the Frisco mine, miners searched for Siringo, but didn't find him. Meanwhile, a more deadly fight broke out at the nearby Gem mine. A man crossing a footbridge was killed, probably by union fire. Company forces evacuated the Gem mine, and hundreds of union men converged on the Bunker Hill mine at Wardner. This mine was also evacuated. About 130 non-union miners were disarmed and expelled from the area.

The violence caused the governor to declare martial law, and send in six companies of the Idaho National Guard to "suppress insurrection and violence." Federal troops also arrived, and they confined six hundred miners in bullpens without any hearings or formal charges. Some were later "sent up" for violating injunctions, others for obstructing the United States mail. Military rule lasted for four months.

On May 15, 1893, in Butte, Montana, the miners formed the Western Federation of Miners (WFM) as a direct result of their experiences in Coeur d'Alene.

== Coeur d'Alene confrontation of 1899 ==
The profitable Bunker Hill Mining Company at Wardner, Idaho had employed Pinkerton labor spies to identify union members. The company fired seventeen union members.

On April 29, 250 angry union members seized a train in Burke and rode it to Wardner, and dynamited a $250,000 mill of the Bunker Hill mine. A non-union miner and a union miner were killed.

At the Idaho governor's request, President William McKinley sent the U.S. army. One thousand men were herded into an old barn. Conditions remained primitive, and three prisoners died.

Emma Langdon, a union sympathizer, charged in a 1908 book that Idaho Governor Frank Steunenberg received $35,000 from the mine operators. J. Anthony Lukas later recorded in the book Big Trouble,

In 1899, when the state needed money for the Coeur d'Alene prosecutions, the Mine Owners' Association had come up with $32,000—about a third of it from Bunker Hill and Sullivan—handing $25,000 over to Governor Steunenberg for use at his discretion in the prosecution. Some of this money went to pay [attorneys].

Some of the miners, never having been charged with any crime, were eventually allowed to go free, while others were prosecuted. The mine owners developed a permit system aimed at excluding union miners from employment.

== See also ==
- Ed Boyce, WFM leader
- Charlie Siringo, Pinkerton agent, labor spy, and hired gunman
- Frank Steunenberg, Governor of Idaho in 1899, murdered in 1905
- Harry Orchard, later convicted of murdering former Idaho Governor Steunenberg
- Steve Adams, accused accomplice of Harry Orchard, unconvicted or acquitted in three trials
- Bill Haywood, WFM union leader, later accused and acquitted of conspiracy to murder former Idaho Governor Steunenberg
- George Pettibone, WFM union supporter, later accused and acquitted of conspiracy to murder former Idaho Governor Steunenberg
- Labor spies
- Cripple Creek miners' strike of 1894, the WFM in Colorado
- Colorado Labor Wars of 1903–04
- Murder of workers in labor disputes in the United States
