= Kellogg, Idaho =

- City
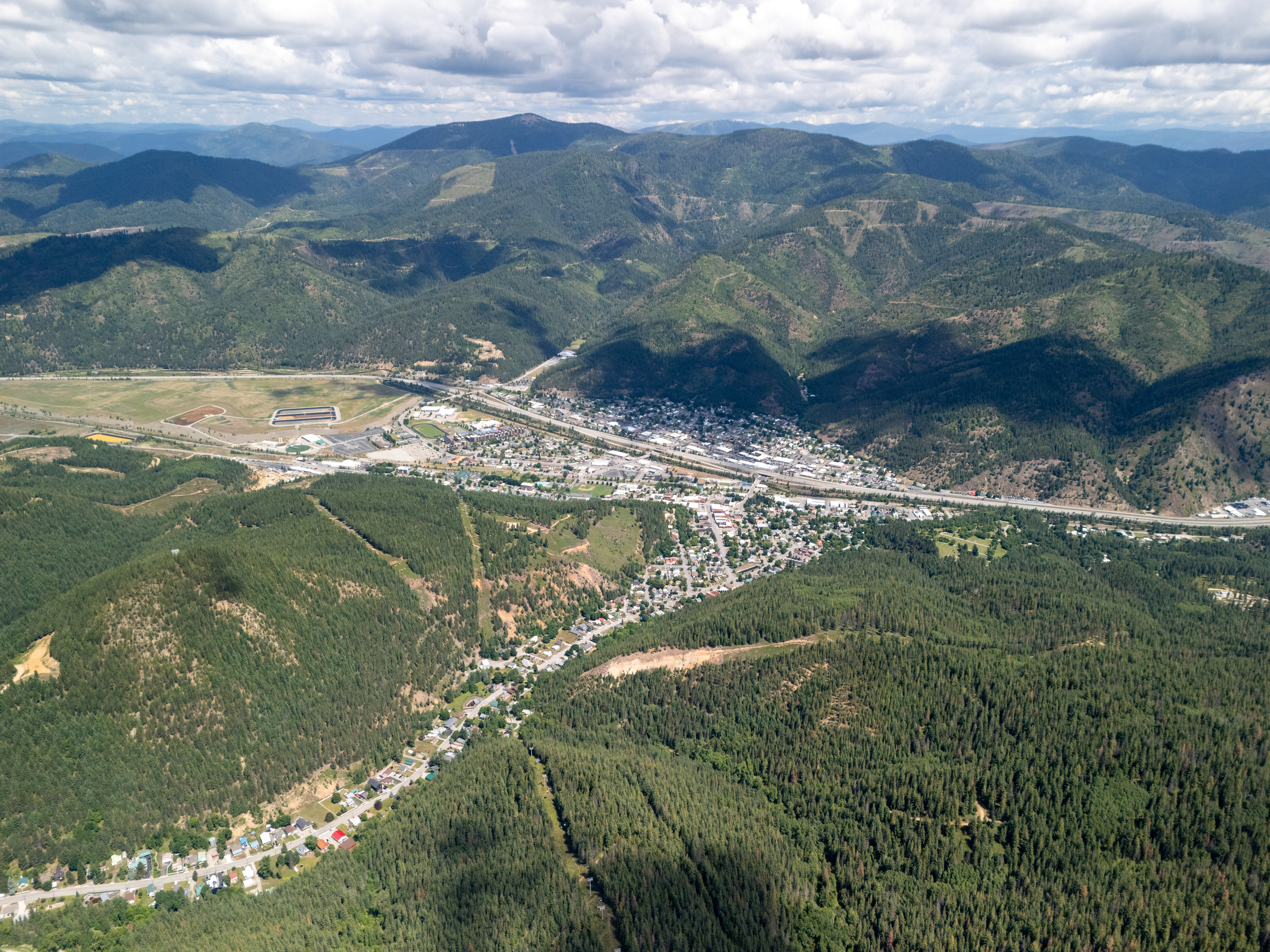
- Drone view from Kellogg, Idaho

- Location of Kellogg in Shoshone County, Idaho
- Coordinates: 47°32′06″N 116°07′36″W
- Country: United States
- State: Idaho
- County: Shoshone

Area
  - Total: 4.01 sq mi (10.39 km^{2})
  - Land: 3.97 sq mi (10.29 km^{2})
  - Water: 0.035 sq mi (0.09 km^{2})
- Elevation: 2,494 ft (760 m)

Population (2020)
  - Total: 2,314
  - Density: 537.5/sq mi (207.52/km^{2})
- Time zone: UTC-8 (PST)
  - Summer (DST): UTC-7 (PDT)
- ZIP code: 83837
- Area codes: 208, 986
- FIPS code: 16-42580
- GNIS feature ID: 2410173
- Website: kellogg.id.gov

Kellogg is a city in the Silver Valley of Shoshone County, Idaho, United States, in the Idaho Panhandle region. The city lies near the Coeur d'Alene National Forest and about 36 miles (58 km) east-southeast of Coeur d'Alene along Interstate 90. As of the 2020 census, Kellogg had a population of 2,314.

== History ==
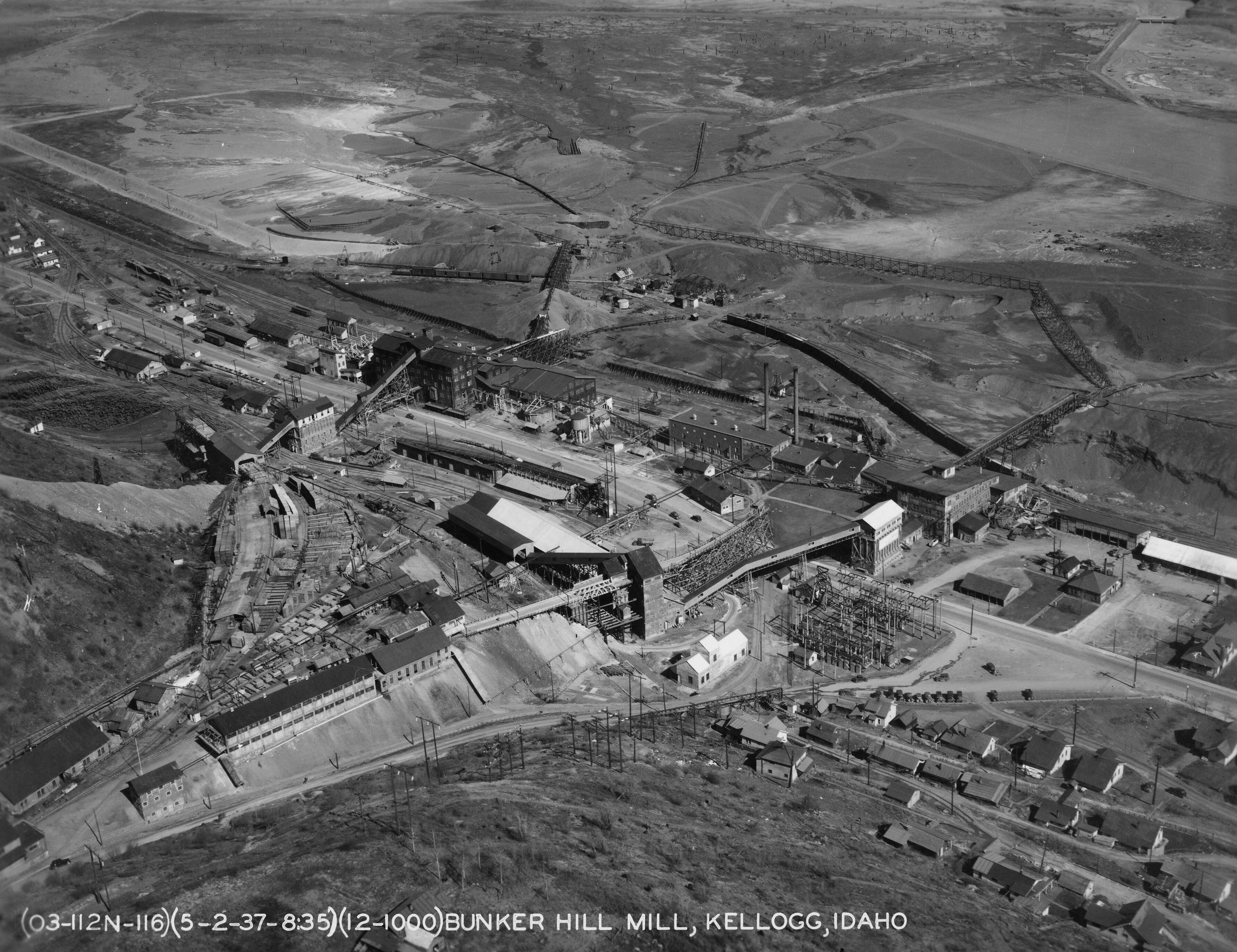
Bunker Hill Mill in Kellogg, 1938

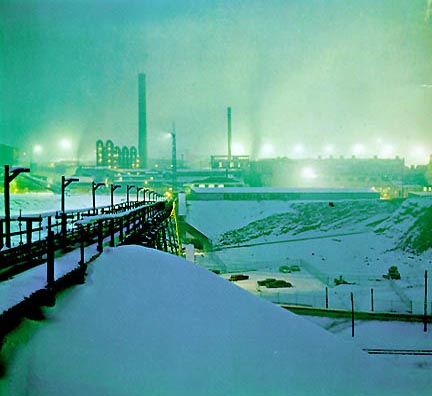
Bunker Hill smelter in operation during the 1970s

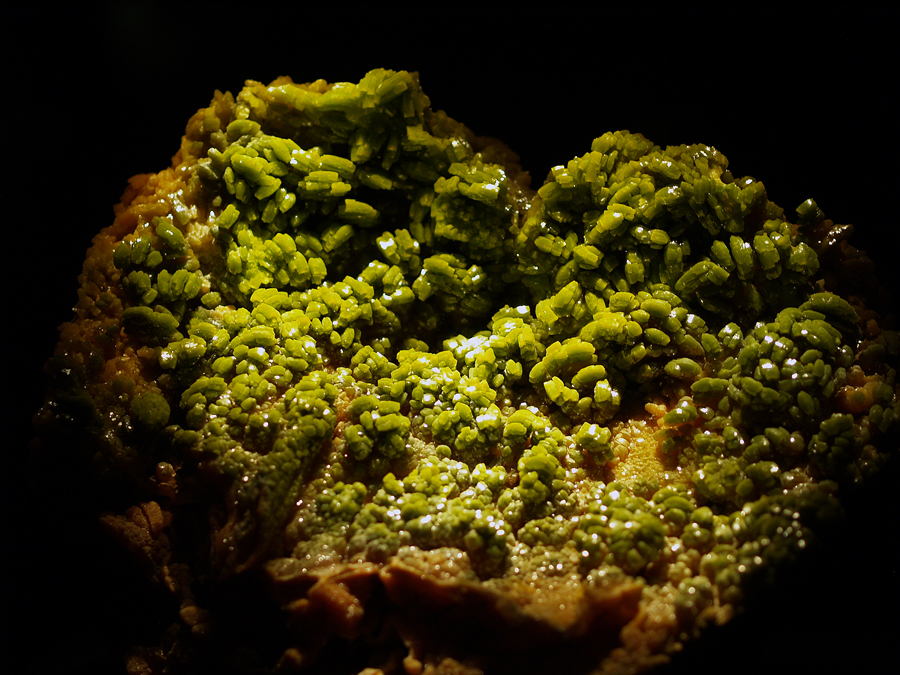
Pyromorphite specimen from the Bunker Hill Mine

Kellogg was incorporated in 1907. The city limits included mine property in 1955, and smelter property in 1956. The population in 1960 was about 6000.

Kellogg is named after a prospector named Noah Kellogg. The city became a center of mining for silver. Nearly a century of mine operations produced an extensive amount of silver. There was also a history of disputes between union miners and mine owners as workers tried to improve their conditions, including wages and safety conditions. With declining yield, the Bunker Hill Mine (& smelter) closed in 1981. Thousands lost their jobs, and the mining operations resulted in regional lead contamination of water and soil. Other mines reduced operations, as well.

Since the mines closed, Kellogg has been developing as a resort town to take advantage of its mountains for skiing and other activities. By 1990 a 3.1 miles (5.0 km) long track gave access by gondola from the city of Kellogg to an alpine ski lodge at 5,700 feet (1,737 m) on Kellogg Mountain.

Condos, hotels, restaurants, shops, a water park, and a golf course have been developed in relation to Silver Mountain Resort on Kellogg Mountain. The city of Kellogg was featured in The New York Times travel section in 2008 as an up-and-coming resort town.

The Silver Mountain Resort is an alpine ski area which includes Kellogg Peak at 6,297 feet (1,919 m) and Wardner Peak (6,200 feet (1,890 m)). It is accessed by taking the world's longest single-cabin gondola.

=== Sunshine Mine ===
In May 1972, the Sunshine Mine of Kellogg was the site of one of the worst U.S. mining accidents, resulting in a fire that caused the deaths of 91 miners. Eight days after the fire started, two men emerged from the mine. They were found on the 4800 ft (1463 m) level of the mine near a fresh air source. All others trapped in the mine had died.

In the aftermath, the government passed new safety regulations. Every miner in the U.S. now carries a "self-rescuer" (a breathing apparatus made with hopcalite and much simpler than a SCBA), which gives the miner a chance to avoid death due to carbon monoxide poisoning.

Sunshine Mine remained open until February 16, 2001, producing 360 million troy ounces (11,000,000 kg) of silver. As of 2005 Sterling Mining has plans to continue exploration and development of the mine, exercising an option the company purchased in 2003.

== Geography ==
According to the United States Census Bureau, the city has a total area of 4.01 square miles (10.39 km^{2}), of which 3.96 square miles (10.26 km^{2}) is land and 0.05 square miles (0.13 km^{2}) is water.

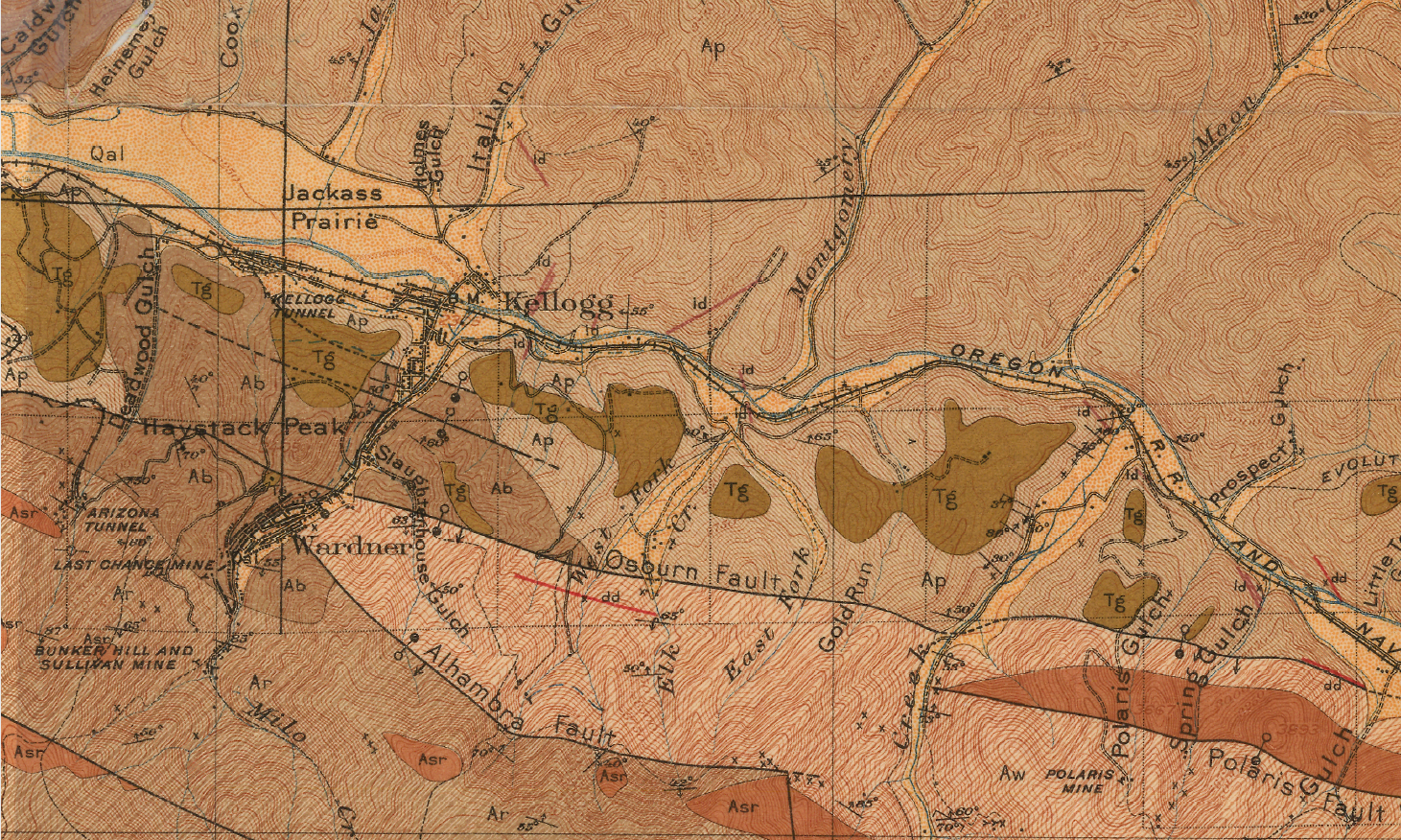
1907 Geological map of Kellogg, and the locations of the Last Chance, Bunker Hill and Sullivan mines

== Climate ==
Kellogg has a mixture of a dry-summer continental climate and a cold mediterranean climate. The area is prone to both heat spikes and cold snaps in spite of fairly moderate averages. The record heat was 111 °F (44 °C) in August 1961 and the record cold was −36 °F (−38 °C) in December 1968. The coldest daily maximum recorded was −6 °F (−21 °C) during said 1968 cold snap. On average between 1991 and 2020, the coldest maximum stood at 17 °F (−8 °C). Diurnal temperature variation is quite low in winter but very high in summer. As a result, warm summer nights are rare. The warmest on record is 74 °F (23 °C) in June 2015, the only night in the 70s in the weather station's history. During a normal year the warmest low is 64 °F (18 °C).

Climate data for Kellogg, Idaho, 1991–2020 normals, extremes 1905–present
Month	Jan	Feb	Mar	Apr	May	Jun	Jul	Aug	Sep	Oct	Nov	Dec	Year
Record high °F (°C)	58 (14)	68 (20)	78 (26)	93 (34)	101 (38)	107 (42)	109 (43)	111 (44)	104 (40)	92 (33)	69 (21)	61 (16)	111 (44)
Mean maximum °F (°C)	49.3 (9.6)	52.5 (11.4)	65.1 (18.4)	74.9 (23.8)	85.8 (29.9)	91.9 (33.3)	97.5 (36.4)	96.7 (35.9)	88.4 (31.3)	74.7 (23.7)	58.0 (14.4)	49.5 (9.7)	99.2 (37.3)
Mean daily maximum °F (°C)	37.0 (2.8)	41.5 (5.3)	49.6 (9.8)	57.8 (14.3)	68.6 (20.3)	74.7 (23.7)	84.9 (29.4)	84.3 (29.1)	73.4 (23.0)	58.0 (14.4)	44.1 (6.7)	36.3 (2.4)	59.2 (15.1)
Daily mean °F (°C)	29.3 (−1.5)	32.0 (0.0)	38.4 (3.6)	45.0 (7.2)	54.2 (12.3)	60.4 (15.8)	67.7 (19.8)	66.6 (19.2)	57.2 (14.0)	45.2 (7.3)	35.6 (2.0)	29.0 (−1.7)	46.7 (8.2)
Mean daily minimum °F (°C)	21.7 (−5.7)	22.6 (−5.2)	27.1 (−2.7)	32.3 (0.2)	39.6 (4.2)	46.0 (7.8)	50.5 (10.3)	48.8 (9.3)	41.0 (5.0)	32.5 (0.3)	27.1 (−2.7)	21.8 (−5.7)	34.3 (1.3)
Mean minimum °F (°C)	5.0 (−15.0)	9.8 (−12.3)	17.7 (−7.9)	25.5 (−3.6)	30.4 (−0.9)	37.6 (3.1)	43.0 (6.1)	40.6 (4.8)	32.4 (0.2)	22.1 (−5.5)	15.8 (−9.0)	7.0 (−13.9)	−0.7 (−18.2)
Record low °F (°C)	−27 (−33)	−26 (−32)	−9 (−23)	6 (−14)	20 (−7)	30 (−1)	31 (−1)	28 (−2)	11 (−12)	0 (−18)	−11 (−24)	−36 (−38)	−36 (−38)
Average precipitation inches (mm)	4.29 (109)	3.06 (78)	3.66 (93)	2.89 (73)	2.88 (73)	2.73 (69)	1.15 (29)	0.82 (21)	1.32 (34)	3.11 (79)	4.55 (116)	3.45 (88)	33.91 (861)
Average snowfall inches (cm)	15.1 (38)	12.0 (30)	6.4 (16)	0.7 (1.8)	0.0 (0.0)	0.0 (0.0)	0.0 (0.0)	0.0 (0.0)	0.0 (0.0)	0.0 (0.0)	4.4 (11)	13.8 (35)	52.4 (131.8)
Average precipitation days (≥ 0.01 inch)	18.0	15.3	17.2	16.4	13.9	11.7	5.8	5.0	6.9	12.8	17.8	18.1	158.9
Average snowy days (≥ 0.1 in)	8.9	6.5	3.6	0.8	0.0	0.0	0.0	0.0	0.0	0.1	3.0	9.5	32.4
Source 1: NOAA
Source 2: National Weather Service

== Demographics ==
Historical population
Census	Pop.	Note	%±
1910	1,278		—
1920	3,017		136.1%
1930	4,124		36.7%
1940	4,235		2.7%
1950	4,913		16.0%
1960	5,061		3.0%
1970	3,811		−24.7%
1980	3,417		−10.3%
1990	2,591		−24.2%
2000	2,395		−7.6%
2010	2,120		−11.5%
2020	2,314		9.2%
U.S. Decennial Census

=== 2020 census ===
As of the 2020 census, Kellogg had a population of 2,314. The median age was 41.3 years. 21.4% of residents were under the age of 18 and 20.3% of residents were 65 years of age or older. For every 100 females there were 100.0 males, and for every 100 females age 18 and over there were 97.7 males age 18 and over.

0.0% of residents lived in urban areas, while 100.0% lived in rural areas.

There were 1,031 households in Kellogg, of which 26.0% had children under the age of 18 living in them. Of all households, 34.9% were married-couple households, 24.6% were households with a male householder and no spouse or partner present, and 30.8% were households with a female householder and no spouse or partner present. About 35.6% of all households were made up of individuals and 14.8% had someone living alone who was 65 years of age or older.

There were 1,204 housing units, of which 14.4% were vacant. The homeowner vacancy rate was 4.1% and the rental vacancy rate was 6.5%.

Racial composition as of the 2020 census
Race	Number	Percent
White	2,079	89.8%
Black or African American	5	0.2%
American Indian and Alaska Native	37	1.6%
Asian	9	0.4%
Native Hawaiian and Other Pacific Islander	2	0.1%
Some other race	35	1.5%
Two or more races	147	6.4%
Hispanic or Latino (of any race)	105	4.5%

=== 2010 census ===
As of the census of 2010, there were 2,120 people, 903 households, and 526 families residing in the city. The population density was 535.4 inhabitants per square mile (206.7/km^{2}). There were 1,202 housing units at an average density of 303.5 per square mile (117.2/km^{2}). The racial makeup of the city was 94.0% White, 0.4% African American, 2.2% Native American, 0.3% Asian, 0.1% Pacific Islander, 1.0% from other races, and 2.0% from two or more races. Hispanic or Latino of any race were 3.2% of the population.

There were 903 households, of which 29.8% had children under the age of 18 living with them, 35.8% were married couples living together, 15.3% had a female householder with no husband present, 7.2% had a male householder with no wife present, and 41.7% were non-families. 34.4% of all households were made up of individuals, and 12.4% had someone living alone who was 65 years of age or older. The average household size was 2.29 and the average family size was 2.91.

The median age in the city was 40.4 years. 24.4% of residents were under the age of 18; 8.3% were between the ages of 18 and 24; 23.5% were from 25 to 44; 27.6% were from 45 to 64; and 16.3% were 65 years of age or older. The gender makeup of the city was 50.0% male and 50.0% female.

=== 2000 census ===
As of the census of 2000, there were 2,395 people, 1,023 households, and 603 families residing in the village. The population density was 1,235.1 inhabitants per square mile (476.9/km^{2}). There were 1,239 housing units at an average density of 639.0 per square mile (246.7/km^{2}). The racial makeup of the city was 94.70% White, 0.13% African American, 1.59% Native American, 0.25% Asian, 0.25% Pacific Islander, 0.46% from other races, and 2.63% from two or more races. Hispanic or Latino of any race were 1.75% of the population.

There were 1,023 households, out of which 30.0% had children under the age of 18 living with them, 43.0% were married couples living together, 11.8% had a female householder with no husband present, and 41.0% were non-families. 35.3% of all households were made up of individuals, and 16.7% had someone living alone who was 65 years of age or older. The average household size was 2.27 and the average family size was 2.94.

In the city, the population was spread out, with 26.1% under the age of 18, 8.1% from 18 to 24, 26.1% from 25 to 44, 21.4% from 45 to 64, and 18.4% who were 65 years of age or older. The median age was 37 years. For every 100 females, there were 93.9 males. For every 100 females age 18 and over, there were 89.1 males.

The median income for a household in the village was $25,898, and the median income for a family was $32,260. Males had a median income of $29,214 versus $17,391 for females. The per capita income for the village was $16,274. About 17.3% of families and 21.8% of the population were below the poverty line, including 30.2% of those under age 18 and 7.3% of those age 65 or over.

== Transportation ==
Intercity bus service to the city is provided by Jefferson Lines.
