= Wardner, Idaho =

- City
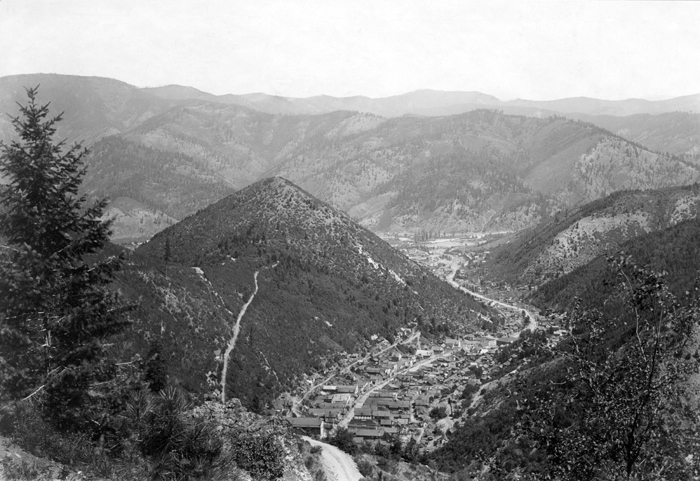
- Wardner in 1904 (foreground), separated from Kellogg (middle ground), by the conical hill called Haystack Peak

- Location of Wardner in Shoshone County, Idaho.
- Coordinates: 47°31′00″N 116°8′03″W
- Country: United States
- State: Idaho
- County: Shoshone

Area
  - Total: 0.87 sq mi (2.26 km^{2})
  - Land: 0.87 sq mi (2.26 km^{2})
  - Water: 0 sq mi (0.00 km^{2})
- Elevation: 3,196 ft (974 m)

Population (2020)
  - Total: 192
  - Estimate (2024): 204
  - Density: 201.9/sq mi (77.95/km^{2})
- Time zone: UTC-8 (Pacific (PST))
  - Summer (DST): UTC-7 (PDT)
- ZIP code: 83837
- Area codes: 208, 986
- FIPS code: 16-85240
- GNIS feature ID: 2412180
- Website: www.wardner.id.gov

Wardner is a city in Shoshone County, Idaho, United States. Located in the Silver Valley mining region, Wardner had a population of 192 as of the 2020 census.

== Geography ==
According to the United States Census Bureau, the city has a total area of 0.86 square miles (2.23 km^{2}), all of it land.

== History ==
The city was named for Joe or Jim Wardner, an early promoter of the Bunker Hill and Sullivan mine in the 1880s and a seller of corner lots in the city. Born in Wisconsin in 1846, he held various occupations in Arizona, California, Utah, Wisconsin, South Dakota, and Washington state. After his time in the Silver Valley of Idaho, he followed the mining booms to South Africa, British Columbia, and the Klondike; he published his autobiography in 1900 and died in El Paso, Texas in 1905.

In 1892, and again in 1899, angry union miners converged on the Bunker Hill mine during confrontations with mine owners.

Hard rock miners in Shoshone County protested wage cuts with a strike in 1892. After several lost their lives in a shooting war provoked by discovery of a company spy, the U.S. army forced an end to the strike. Hostilities erupted once again in 1899 when, in response to the company firing seventeen men for joining the union, the miners dynamited the Bunker Hill & Sullivan mill. Again, lives were lost, and the army intervened.

The gondola for the Silver Mountain ski resort passes over the town.

== Demographics ==
Historical population
Census	Pop.	Note	%±
1910	1,369		—
1920	704		−48.6%
1930	903		28.3%
1940	861		−4.7%
1950	772		−10.3%
1960	577		−25.3%
1970	492		−14.7%
1980	423		−14.0%
1990	246		−41.8%
2000	215		−12.6%
2010	188		−12.6%
2020	192		2.1%
2024 (est.)	204		6.3%
U.S. Decennial Census

=== 2010 census ===
At the 2010 census there were 188 people in 75 households, including 60 families, in the city. The population density was 218.6 inhabitants per square mile (84.4/km^{2}). There were 118 housing units at an average density of 137.2 per square mile (53.0/km^{2}). The racial makup of the city was 95.2% White, 1.1% Native American, 1.6% Asian, 0.5% from other races, and 1.6% from two or more races. Hispanic or Latino of any race were 2.7%.

Of the 75 households 29.3% had children under the age of 18 living with them, 60.0% were married couples living together, 8.0% had a female householder with no husband present, 12.0% had a male householder with no wife present, and 20.0% were non-families. 16.0% of households were one person and 5.3% were one person aged 65 or older. The average household size was 2.51 and the average family size was 2.62.

The median age was 46 years. 20.2% of residents were under the age of 18; 7.5% were between the ages of 18 and 24; 20.8% were from 25 to 44; 35.1% were from 45 to 64; and 16.5% were 65 or older. The gender makeup of the city was 51.6% male and 48.4% female.

=== 2000 census ===
At the 2000 census there were 215 people in 88 households, including 60 families, in the city. The population density was 251.1 inhabitants per square mile (97.0/km^{2}). There were 111 housing units at an average density of 129.6 per square mile (50.0/km^{2}). The racial makup of the city was 95.81% White, 0.47% Native American, 0.47% Pacific Islander, 1.40% from other races, and 1.86% from two or more races. Hispanic or Latino of any race were 2.33%.

Of the 88 households 25.0% had children under the age of 18 living with them, 50.0% were married couples living together, 9.1% had a female householder with no husband present, and 31.8% were non-families. 25.0% of households were one person and 15.9% were one person aged 65 or older. The average household size was 2.44 and the average family size was 2.85.

The age distribution was 24.7% under the age of 18, 7.4% from 18 to 24, 24.7% from 25 to 44, 30.2% from 45 to 64, and 13.0% 65 or older. The median age was 42 years. For every 100 females, there were 104.8 males. For every 100 females age 18 and over, there were 105.1 males.

The median household income was $25,500 and the median family income was $31,563. Males had a median income of $36,071 versus $21,250 for females. The per capita income for the city was $14,051. About 14.0% of families and 12.8% of the population were below the poverty line, including 3.8% of those under the age of eighteen and 6.5% of those sixty five or over.

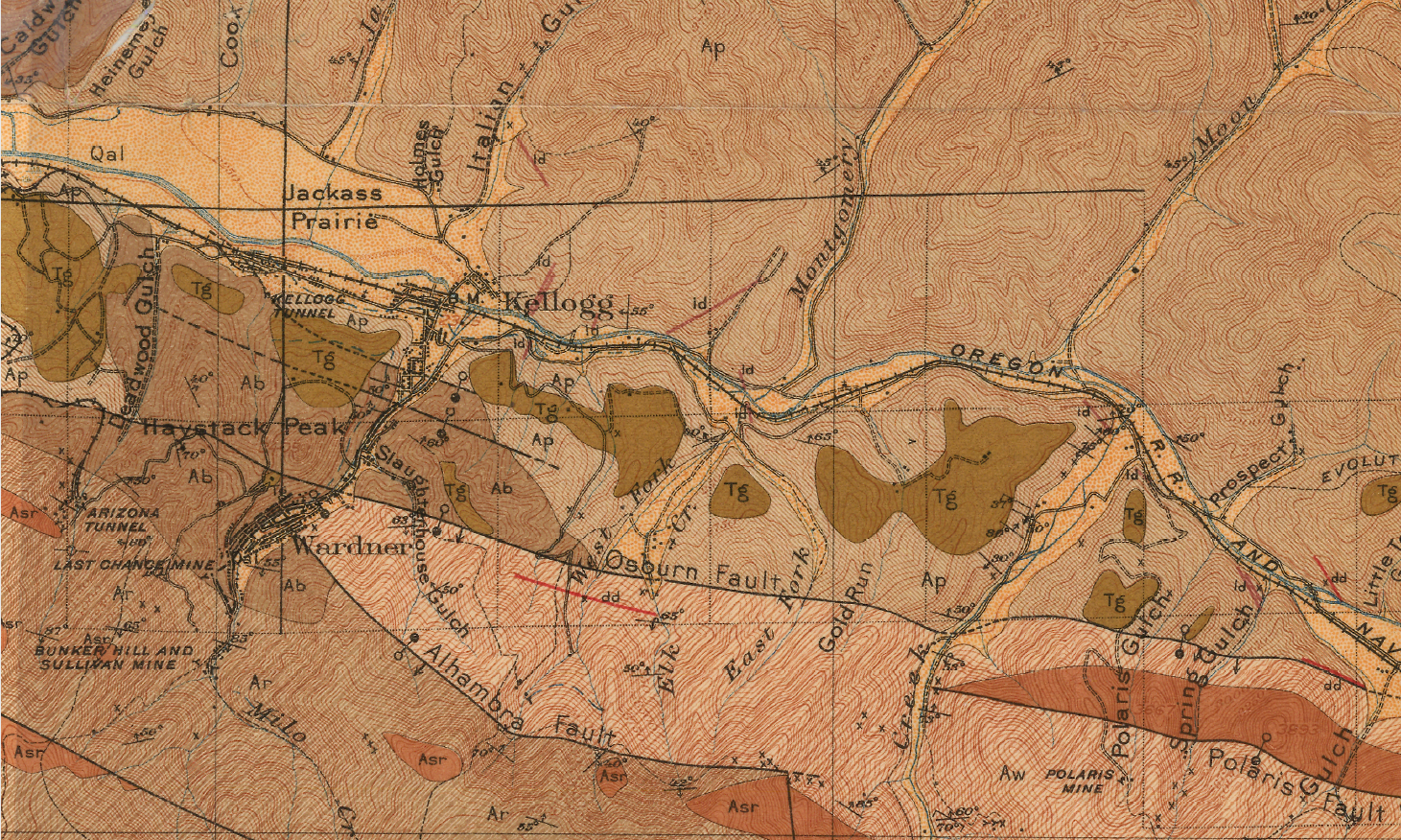
1907 geological map of Wardner, and the locations of the Last Chance, Bunker Hill, and Sullivan mines

== See also ==
- Silver Valley
- Silver Mountain - ski resort
