= Bunker Hill Mining Company =

American mining company

- Formerly: Bunker Hill and Sullivan Mining and Concentrating Company; Bunker Hill Company
- Type: Public (until 1968 merger)
- Industry: Mining; Smelting; Metal refining
- Founded: July 29, 1887 (incorporated)
- Founder: Simeon Reed
- Defunct: 1982
- Fate: Merged into Gulf Resources & Chemical Corp. (1968); mine and smelter complex closed in 1982
- Successor: Gulf Resources Corp.
- Headquarters: San Francisco (historically); Kellogg, Idaho (from 1962), United States
- Number of locations: Kellogg, Idaho; Wardner, Idaho
- Area served: United States
- Key people: John Hays Hammond (president, 1891); Frederick Worthen Bradley (president, 1897–1933); John D. Bradley (president, from 1955)
- Products: Lead; Zinc; Silver
- Number of employees: c. 2,800 (Kellogg complex, c. 1970)

The Bunker Hill Mining Company is a mining company with facilities in Kellogg and Wardner, Idaho.

== Early history ==
Simeon Reed bought the Bunker Hill Mine and Mill, and incorporated the Bunker Hill and Sullivan Mining and Concentrating Company on 29 July 1887. John Hays Hammond was hired to manage the mine, and a new concentrator, The Old South Mill, became operational in 1891, capable of 150 tons per day. Hammond became president on 2 July 1891, followed by Nathaniel H. Harris on 15 June 1893, when company headquarters were located in San Francisco. William Henry Crocker, of Crocker National Bank, served as treasurer, in addition to being the major stockholder.

When the mining boom began in the Coeur d'Alene, Idaho mining district, the area was lightly inhabited. The Bunker Hill and the Sullivan companies built a boarding house for miners in 1887. By 1894, the company employed 332 workers, and in the late 1890s, the company built single-family houses to attract family men. In 1900, the company opened a company-built Kellogg school building, contributed to the construction of local churches, and started a loan program so employees could own their homes.

Frederick Worthen Bradley, a college-educated engineer, became president in 1897 and remained so until 1933, when Stanly A. Easton took over.

=== 1892 labor unrest ===
On 11 July 1892, violence erupted during a strike at two nearby mines, the Gem and the Frisco in Burke-Canyon, resulting in the deaths of 3 union members, a Pinkerton detective, and a nonunion worker. Protesting a 1 April 1892 wage cut, after a 1 Jan. 1892 lockout, the union men forced the closure of the Bunker Hill mine. Governor N.B. Willey declared martial law and the military moved in to restore order. The mine was operational again on 19 July 1892.

=== Cave-in ===
The office of the mining inspector during the period 1893 to 1909 was occupied by men who were closely identified with the industry. A cave-in on 23 Feb. 1894, at the Bunker Hill and Sullivan Mine took the lives of three men, shortly after the first state mining inspector took office in 1893. A coroner's jury investigated the incident and issued a report which stated, in part,

We earnestly and emphatically call upon Mine Inspector Haskins to visit these mines immediately and demonstrate that he is willing to enforce the law if there should be any infraction thereof, and that he wears not the collar of any individual or corporation...

The Bunker Hill and Sullivan Mine manager commented upon annual inspections of the enormous mining complex, declaring that the visits were "rather a perfunctory affair" which accomplished little. He argued that an employer would never run an unsafe mine because economic considerations prevented it.

Bradley also wrote Harris, "In working the mine we are sure to kill a certain percentage of our men." Between March 1893 and Feb. 1894, 15 fatalities occurred at the mine, yet the mine continued to operate under the fellow-servant rule doctrine.

A stronger inspection law was passed in 1909.

Yet, between 1911 and 1912, there were 11 fatalities. Only with the passing of the Idaho State Workman's Compensation law, was indemnity determined for each injury or death, rather than settled by company benevolence.

=== 1899 labor unrest ===
In 1899 the Bunker Hill Mining Company had paid more than $600,000 in dividends, and was considered profitable. Miners working in the Bunker Hill and Sullivan mines were receiving fifty cents to a dollar less per day than other miners. The Bunker Hill Mining Company operated the only mines in the district that were not unionized, and the only mines that paid less than union scale of $3.50 per day. The Bunker Hill company employed Pinkerton labor spies to identify union members, who were immediately fired.

The Western Federation of Miners launched an organizing drive at the Bunker Hill Mining Company.

After declaring that the company would rather "shut down and remain closed twenty years" than to recognize the union, Superintendent Albert Burch fired seventeen suspected union members. He demanded that all other union men collect their back pay and quit.

On 29 April 1899, union miners hijacked a Northern Pacific train in Burke and drove it to Wardner, the site of a $250,000 mill of the Bunker Hill mine. The miners set off three thousand pounds of dynamite, destroying the mill. Two men were killed, one of them a non-union miner, the other a union man accidentally shot by other union miners. Fire also destroyed the company offices.

Governor Frank Steunenberg declared martial law, and federal troops took over on 4 May 1899. Over 700 men were arrested, and three People's Party commissioners and sheriff, were impeached and removed from office. A new and more efficient mill was in operation in 3 months, with a greater capacity. Additionally, miners were required to take an oath of non-union membership in order to get a permit to work.

The eight-hour day had been a major issue for the Western Federation of Miners throughout the West. In 1900, after the Western Federation of Miners had been crushed in Coeur d'Alene, the Bunker Hill & Sullivan Mine operated with a ten-hour shift, seven days a week.

Years later Harry Orchard, who had assassinated former Idaho Governor Frank Steunenberg, claimed to have helped to light the dynamite charges at the Bunker Hill mill. However, two Coeur d'Alene residents testified that Orchard was with them in Mullan, Idaho playing poker when the mill was dynamited in Wardner.

Orchard also admitted to bombing Bradley's home on 7 Nov. 1904, which left Bradley blind and deaf for two months and scarred his face and body.

Idaho passed an 8-hour work day law in 1907, and in 1919, Bunker Hill agreed to the 8-hour day with the Mine, Mill and Smeltermen's Union No. 18, which included travel to and from their work site within the mine.

== Later history ==
The Bunker Hill Co. employed a total of about 7000 people from 1902 to 1912, with about 460 men working the mine in 1915. In 1907 built a hospital, and a YMCA building that included a gymnasium, swimming pool and bowling alley. The company improved the water system in 1912, and constructed a sewer system in 1913. They then paid for a YMCA baseball diamond and playground in 1916. During WWI, the company offered rent-free housing for dependents of employees serving in the military. Between 1915 and 1923, the Bunker Hill Co. paid an average annual dividend of about $1.5 million, about 50% of the initial capitalized stock of $3.2 million.

The company built and operated its own lead smelter in Smelterville, Idaho, starting on 5 July 1917, but continued to use the ASARCO smelter in Tacoma until 1 February 1930. In 1920 the company gained a controlling interest in the Northwest Lead Co., which made lead plumbing supplies and white lead. The company then was able to mine, mill, smelt, refine, manufacture, and market lead. The company then constructed an electrolytic zinc plant after purchasing the Star Mine in Burke. Bunker Hill formed an equal partnership with Hecla Mining to develop the Star Ore and develop the zinc plant, calling the company the Sullivan Mining Company. The Star ore was accessed and mined from an almost 8000 foot tunnel from the lower workings of Hecla Mine. The tunnel was started in 1921, and the zinc plant was operational by October 1928, and used Dr. U.C. Tainton's process. The Tainton process used sulphuric acid to combine with the zinc, forming a sulphate solution, followed by electrolysis to remove the zinc. The product was called Bunker Hill 99.9 percent zinc. Tainton was paid a 10% royalty in return for Bunker Hill to have exclusive rights within the county. A cadmium recovery system was added to the zinc plant in 1929. In addition to the Star ore, Bunker Hill acquired zinc-lead-silver mines in the Pine Creek District, which they developed from an extension of the Kellogg tunnel.

In 1924, while incorporating in the state of Delaware, the company set aside 300,00 shares of preferred stock for employees. Bunker Hill stock was listed on the New York Curb Exchange in 1926. By 1926, the Bunker Hill and Sullivan Mining Company was Idaho's largest employer. During the Great Depression, Bunker Hill kept production at pre-depression levels to keep its workers employed at the same wages, even if it meant an operating loss for the company.

During WWII, Bunker Hill added an antimony electrolytic plant, and because of the manpower shortage, employed about 200 women. In 1942, the miners were finally able to organize, voting to join the International Union of Mine, Mill and Smelter Workers. After the war, the company built a boarding house capable of accommodating several hundred, 5 apartment houses, and 48 single family homes. By 1956, the company owned 107 houses, the land under another 188-220, and allowed employees to purchase them. In 1949, the company reached an agreement with the miner's union to provide dependent medical care in addition to a sickness and accident policy, with the company covering half the costs.

In the 1950s, the company bought out the Hecla Mining Co.'s interest in the Sullivan Mining Co., changed its name to the Bunker Hill Company, and moved its headquarters into the Bunker Hill Building at 660 Market Street (San Francisco). On 29 March 1955, John D. Bradley, Frederick's son, took over as company president. In 1956, the Bunker Hill Co. bought Northwest Lead Company and Associated Lead & Zinc, which became their chemical products division. After a 7-month strike, Northwest Metal Workers took over representation of the 1800 Bunker Hill workers in 1960, before becoming United Steelworkers of America Local No. 7854 in 1970. At that time, Bunker Hill employed about 2800 employees at its Kellogg complex. Corporate headquarters moved from San Francisco to Kellogg in 1962. On 26 July 1965, the company sold 1,590,000 shares in an initial public offering on the New York Stock Exchange. That led Gulf Resources & Chemical Corp. to purchase Bunker Hill stock in a hostile takeover bid. On 28 May 1968, Bunker Hill stockholders agreed to the merger ending Bunker Hill's 81 years as an independent company as Bunker Hill was replaced by Gulf Resources Corp. on the exchange. Bunker Hill reported financial losses of $4.563 million in 1970, $3.85 million in 1971, and $9.037 million in 1973. The company then recorded profits of $25.953 million in 1974, $6.912 million in 1975, and $6.037 million in 1977, before recording another loss of $9.037 million in 1977. The Bunker Hill mine and smelter complex closed in 1982, due to lower metal prices, and lower EPA limits for lead. Over 2000 people were then left unemployed.

== See also ==
- Bunker Hill Mine and Smelting Complex
