= Bulkeley Wells =

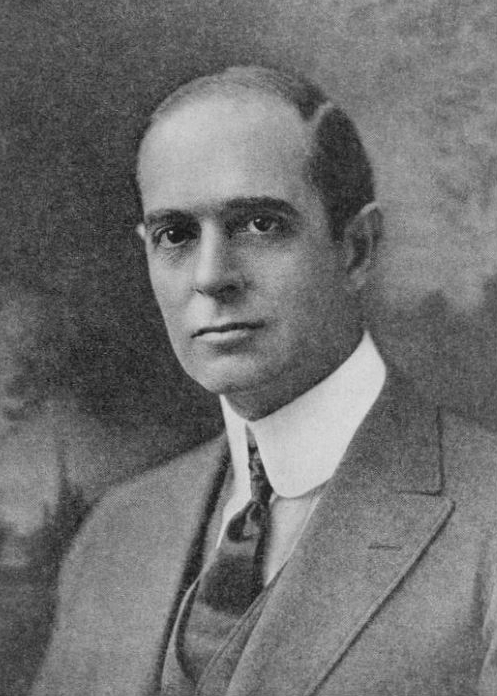
Bulkeley Wells. Photo from History of Colorado, edited by Wilbur Fiske Stone (1918).

Bulkeley Wells (March 10, 1872 – May 26, 1931), also spelled Buckeley Wells, was an American businessperson involved in mining. Born in Chicago to businessman Samuel Edgar Wells and Marry Agnes Bulkeley, Wells was educated at Roxbury Latin School and at Harvard University.

== Career ==
He married into the wealthy family of Colonel Thomas L. Livermore, to daughter Grace Livermore. He moved to Telluride, Colorado, and joined the executive board of the Telluride Mining Association, and headed up the San Miguel County Citizens' Alliance (SMCCA). He had a deputy sheriff's commission, and was captain of Troop A of the Colorado National Guard. He was also a Mason, and an Elk. Wells became president and manager of the Smuggler-Union Mining Company after the murder of Arthur L. Collins.

=== Union hostility ===
Bulkeley Wells was noted for his hostility to unions. He conducted a campaign of vilification of Vincent Saint John, the head of the Telluride Miners' Union.

Wells, according to writer MaryJoy Martin, was "born to privilege... [and was] convinced laborers were beneath him," was intent upon hanging Vincent St. John, the head of the local miners union. According to Martin, Wells colluded with others, including Pinkerton Agent James McParland, and the Colorado Mine Owners' Association, to accuse St. John of conducting a "reign of terror" — and in particular, of murdering William J. Barney, a mine guard who had disappeared from his post. McParland, who decades earlier had been the special agent assigned to infiltrate the Molly Maguires in Pennsylvania, contributed his belief that an "Inner Circle" within the Western Federation of Miners was responsible for widespread assassinations.

Former McParland stenographer Morris Friedman wrote that McParland gained considerable income from Colorado's mining interests for the Pinkerton National Detective Agency by making such unproved accusations.

At the time of his disappearance, the Telluride authorities didn't know any details of Will Barney's age, marital status, family, or where he came from. But they found some remains, and they drew conclusions. Wells placed a skull in a shop window, adorned with a sign decrying the "Grewsome Work" of the Telluride Miners' Union. There was one complicating factor: William Julius Barney wasn't dead.

== Later life ==
Wells had an affair with socialite Louise Sneed Hill while both were married.

His wife, Grace Livermore Wells, divorced him in 1918. As a result of the divorce, Wells lost $15 million in mining interests and the financing he received from his wife's family. Wells and Hill continued their affair until the death of Louise's husband, Crawford Hill, in 1922. When he did not marry her, but eloped with another woman, Hill vowed to "break him." She persuaded his remaining financial backer, Harry Payne Whitney, to withdraw his support. He lost his mining empire and gas and oil speculations. He gambled and lost the last of his money. He committed suicide in San Francisco in 1931, while on the verge of bankruptcy.
