= Central City Parkway =

Highway in Clear Creek and Gilpin counties in Colorado, United States

- Central City Parkway highlighted in red
- Length: 8.4 mi (13.5 km)
- South end: I-70 / US 6 / US 40 south of Central City
- North end: Nevadaville Road and Nevada Street in Central City

Construction
- Inauguration: 2003

The Central City Parkway is a four-lane, 8.4-mile (13.5 km) highway in Clear Creek and Gilpin counties in the US state of Colorado that connects Interstate 70/U.S. Route 6/U.S. Route 40 (I-70/US 6/US 40), immediately south of Central City and about 3 miles [4.8 km] east of Idaho Springs, with Nevadaville Road and Nevada Street in the historic mining town and gambling area of Central City. Nearly the entire route is within the city limits of Central City. Opened on November 19, 2004, the parkway provides direct access to Central City. The length of the parkway can be traveled in about twelve minutes. As part of the opening ceremonies in 2004, 1996 Indianapolis 500 winner Buddy Lazier made the trip from I-70 to Central City's historic downtown in three minutes.

== Route description ==
The parkway begins at a diamond interchange (exit 243) on I-70/US-6/US 40. At the interchange, CR 314 serves as a frontage road. Heading northward, the parkway abruptly turns left. After passing through several hills in a forested area, the road curves around again and heads northeastward, winding through hills. At the Clear Creek-Gilpin county line, the road turns northward, then northeastward, passing into a more heavily forested area. Through the drive, the road continues to wind between northward and westward before entering the vicinity of Central City, where it meets its terminus at a T intersection with Nevadaville Road. The roadway continues northeast as Nevada Street.

== History ==
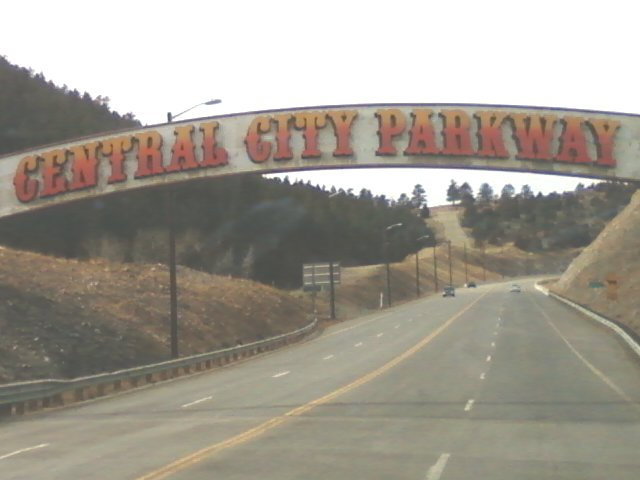
Central City Parkway archway upon entering from I-70, February 2009

Limited-stakes gambling was approved by Colorado voters in 1990 in the towns of Central City, Black Hawk and Cripple Creek. Black Hawk lies a mile closer to the Denver area along State Highway 119, the primary route to the area from I-70, spurring planning for a direct route to Central City from I-70 that began in 1993.

In the mid-1990s, the city of Black Hawk backed a proposal for a state-funded widening of Highway 119 including a tunnel that would link to I-70 one mile (1.6 km) closer to Denver than Central City's off-ramp. Central City continued with its plans for a south access highway despite the city of Black Hawk acquiring land in the path of the proposed road. The issue was brought before a Denver grand jury that decided Black Hawk officials had misspent taxpayer money. Central City then sued Black Hawk for $100 million; Black Hawk countersued. Prior to dropping the lawsuit, the road was funded by bonds with a 30-year tax levy on business property to pay for the road.

Six months before the parkway opened, a report issued by gambling industry consultant Gaming & Resort Development predicted the road would be more beneficial to Black Hawk than to Central City.

Central City's gaming revenues have substantially increased since the road's opening in November 2004 but have not reached industry and city projections. Since the Parkway's opening, three casinos in Central City have opened and two, under the same ownership, have closed (The Teller House in July 2005 and Scarlet's Casino in September 2006). Century Casinos opened in July 2006.

Between I-70 and Central City, there is only one public exit road from the Central City Parkway: the Hidee Mine Road at mile 6.3. This road leads to the Hidee Gold Mine, which offers mine tours and gold panning, and is open to the public.

== Major intersections ==
| County | Location | mi | km | Destinations | Notes |
|---|---|---|---|---|---|
| Clear Creek | | 0.0 | 0.0 | I-70 east / US 6 east (Grand Army of the Republic Highway) / US 40 east – Golden, Genesee, Denver I-70 west / US 6 west (Grand Army of the Republic Highway) / US 40 west – Idaho Springs, Downieville, Silverthorne | Southern terminus; Diamond interchange (Exit 243) |
| Gilpin | Central City | 6.3 | 10.1 | Hidee Mine Road (west) | T intersection |
| Gilpin | Central City | 8.4 | 13.5 | Nevadaville Road (west) – Nevadaville | Northern terminus; T intersection |
| Gilpin | Central City | 8.4 | 13.5 | Nevada Street (east) – Black Hawk, SH 119 | Continuation northeast from northern terminus |
1.000 mi = 1.609 km; 1.000 km = 0.621 mi
