= Central City, Colorado =

Home-rule city in Gilpin and Clear Creek counties, Colorado, US

- Home rule city
- City of Central
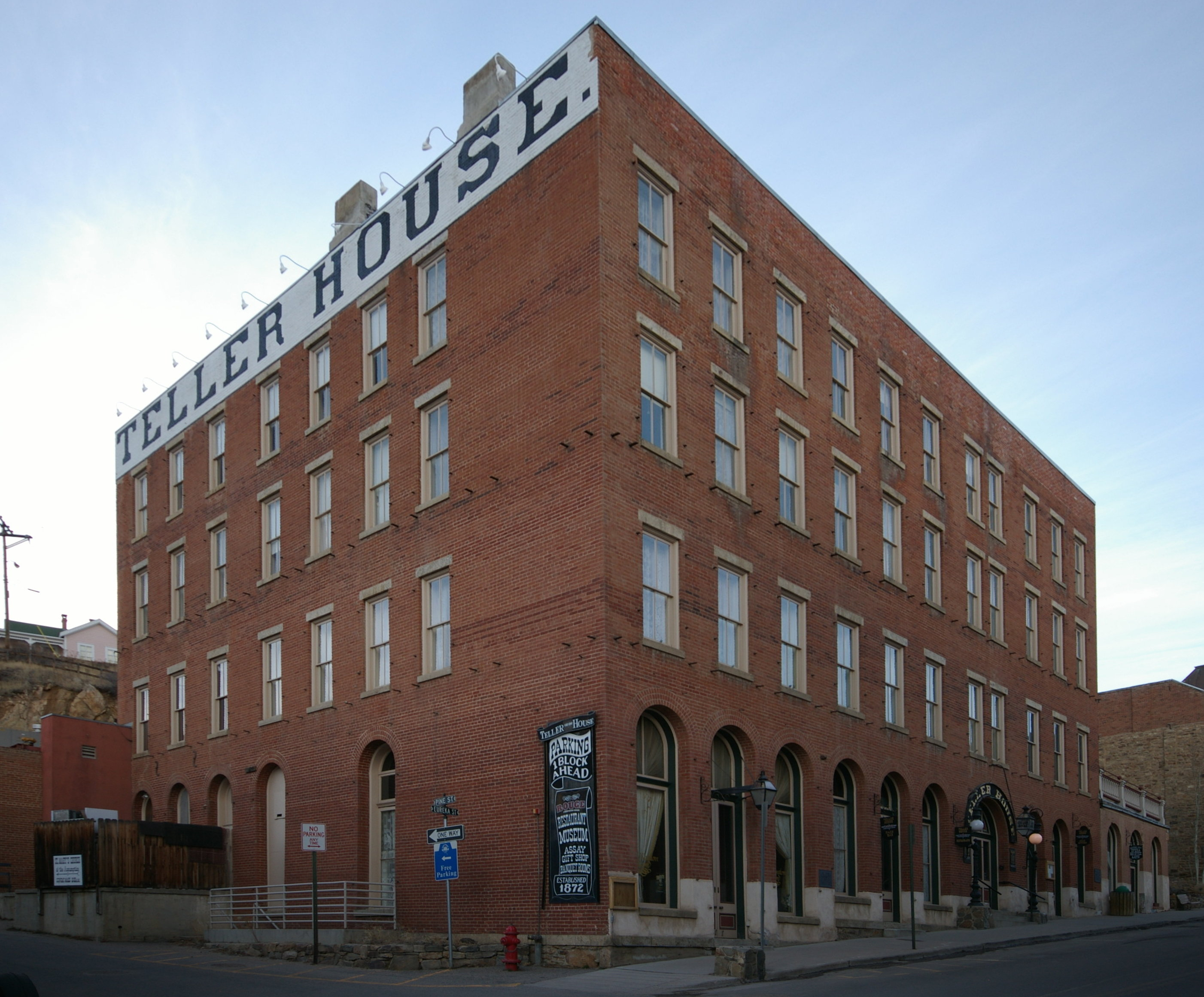
- The Teller House in Central City
- Nickname: The Richest Square Mile on Earth
- Location of Central City in Gilpin and Clear Creek counties, Colorado
- Coordinates: 39°45′56″N 105°28′37″W
- Country: United States
- State: Colorado
- Counties: Gilpin; Clear Creek
- Settled: 1859
- Incorporated: June 12, 1886

Government
  - Type: Home rule city

Area
  - Total: 2.1599 sq mi (5.5940 km^{2})
  - Land: 2.1597 sq mi (5.5937 km^{2})
  - Water: 0.00012 sq mi (0.0003 km^{2})
- Elevation: 8,691 ft (2,649 m)

Population (2020)
  - Total: 779
  - Density: 361/sq mi (139/km^{2})
- Time zone: UTC−07:00 (MST)
  - Summer (DST): UTC−06:00 (MDT)
- ZIP code: 80427
- Area codes: 303/720/983
- GNIS city ID: 2409427
- FIPS code: 08-12900
- Website: centralcity.colorado.gov

Central City is a home rule municipality located in Gilpin and Clear Creek counties, Colorado, United States. Central City is the county seat of and the most populous municipality in Gilpin County. The city population was 779, all in Gilpin County, at the 2020 United States census. The city is a historic mining settlement founded in 1859 during the Pike's Peak Gold Rush and came to be known as the "Richest Square Mile on Earth". Central City and the adjacent city of Black Hawk form the federally designated Central City/Black Hawk Historic District. The city is now a part of the Denver-Aurora-Centennial, CO Metropolitan Statistical Area and the Front Range Urban Corridor.

== History ==
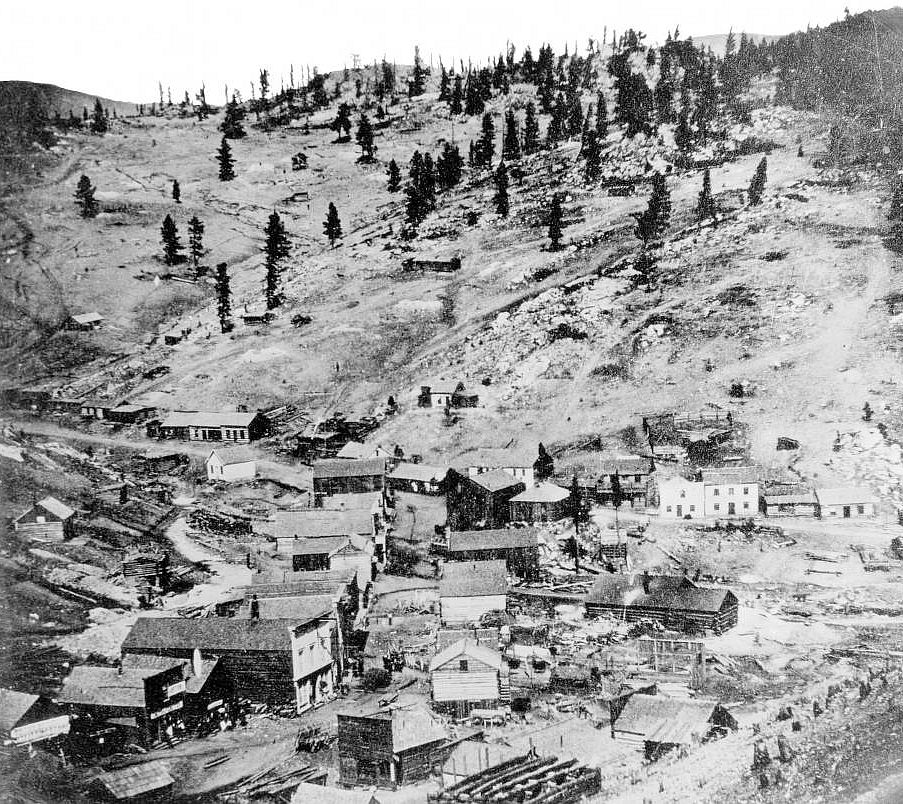
Central City, 1862

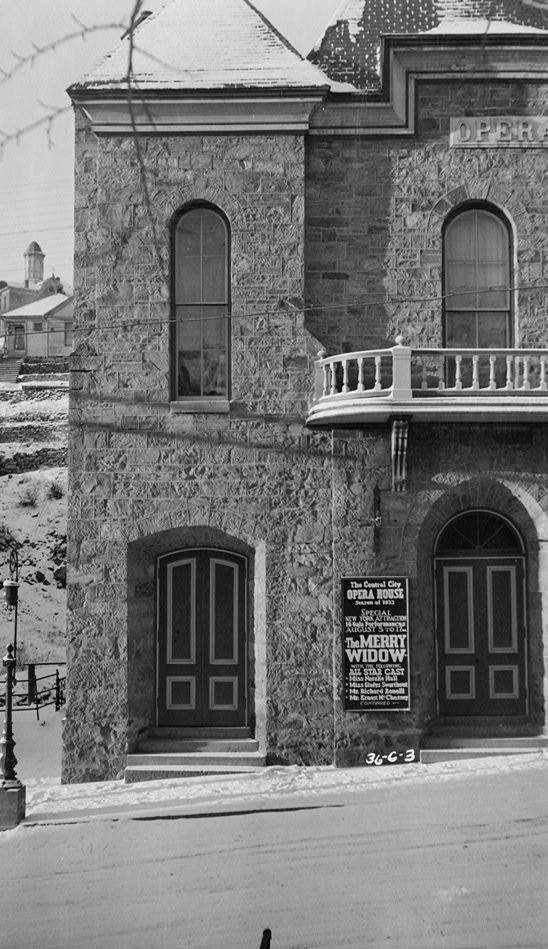
Central City Opera House, 1934

On May 6, 1859, during the Pike's Peak Gold Rush, John H. Gregory found a gold-bearing vein (the Gregory Lode) in Gregory Gulch between Black Hawk and Central City. Within two months many other veins were discovered, including the Bates, Gunnell, Kansas, and Burroughs.

The Mountain City, Kansas Territory, post office opened on January 17, 1860 The area uphill (west) from Mountain City was known as Central City. As many as 10,000 prospectors soon flocked to the town and surrounding prospects. On February 28, 1861, U.S. President James Buchanan signed an act creating the free Territory of Colorado. On November 1, 1861, the Colorado Territory created Gilpin County with Central City as the county seat.

The year 1863 brought the first attempt by hard rock miners to form a hard rock miners' union. Of 125 miners signing a union resolution in Mountain City, about fifty broke windows and doors at the Bob Tail mine, forcing other workers out. After a night of shooting and fighting, the union effort among Central City miners failed.

On March 11, 1864, Mountain City, Colorado Territory, was officially incorporated, with John S. McCool serving as the first mayor.

Many Chinese immigrants lived in Mountain City during the early days working the placer deposits of Gregory Gulch. They were forbidden to work in the underground mines. Most of them are believed to have returned to China after making their stake.

The frontier gambler Poker Alice lived for a time in Central City and several other Colorado mining communities.

As the mining pits expanded, the Mountain City post office was moved uphill and reopened as the Central City, Colorado Territory, post office on October 8, 1869.

On April 28, 1873, the city was visited by U.S. President Ulysses S. Grant and the first lady, who arrived with a group including Governor Elbert, ex-governor Edward M. McCook, Jerome B. Chaffee, Henry M. Teller, General Harney, and General Babcock. The party came to Black Hawk from Golden via train, then transferred to carriages for the transit to Central City. Upon arrival, the procession paraded through town, which was thronged with spectators, before stopping at the Teller House at 1 p.m. In preparation for their visit, the sidewalk leading to the entrance had been covered with silver bricks from the Caribou Mine, valued at about $13,000. President Grant was reportedly incredulous when he walked over the silver bricks to the entrance and learned that they were pure silver. After dinner and a reception, the party departed for Idaho Springs, the next stop on Grant's tour of Colorado.

On May 22, 1874, a fire started in a Chinese laundry on Gregory street at 11 a.m. and spread quickly throughout the town. A request for help was sent to Golden and the Excelsior Fire Company took a special train to Central City to help fight the fire, arriving to cheers from the locals. Smoke billowing from the fire could be observed as far as Denver, which also sent a fire engine by train after receiving a dispatch to the mayor of Denver stating "The flames are still raging. Send assistance." By 3:30 p.m. the fire was under control, but not before destroying most of the city. The Teller House, Catholic church, Roworth's City Bakery, and several other structures survived the fire, while about 150 structures were destroyed. Many people lost their homes, businesses and belongings as a result, forcing the town to undertake a large effort to rebuild. Total losses from the fire were estimated to exceed half a million dollars. To help prevent future fires, ordinances were passed to widen the city streets and build a water supply for fire prevention.

Gold mining in the Central City district decreased rapidly between 1900 and 1920, as the veins were exhausted. Mining revived in the early 1930s in response to the increase in the price of gold from $20 to $35 per ounce, but then virtually shut down during World War II when gold mining was declared nonessential to the war effort. The district was enlivened in the 1950s by efforts to locate uranium deposits, but these proved unsuccessful.

The City of Central was reincorporated on June 12, 1886.

The population of Central City and its sister city Black Hawk fell to a few hundred by the 1950s. Casino gambling was introduced in both towns in the early 1990s, but had more success in Black Hawk (which has 18 casinos) than in Central City (which has 6 casinos), partly because the main road to Central City passed through Black Hawk, tempting gamblers to stop in Black Hawk instead. In an effort to compete, Central City completed a four-lane, 8.4-mile (13.5 km) parkway from Interstate 70 to Central City, without going through Black Hawk. The highway was completed in 2004, but Black Hawk, which prior to the introduction of gambling was much smaller than Central City, continues to generate more than seven times the gambling revenue that Central City does. To compete, Central City has recently eliminated height restrictions for building on undeveloped land. Buildings were previously limited to heights of 53 feet (16 m), so as not to overshadow the town's historic buildings.

Tax from the gambling revenue provides funding for the State Historical Fund, administered by the Colorado Office of Archaeology and Historic Preservation.

== Geography ==
Central City is located in southern Gilpin County. The city limits extend south along the Central City Parkway into Clear Creek County, as far as Interstate 70. The city is bordered by Black Hawk to the east and Idaho Springs to the south.

At the 2020 United States census, the city had a total area of 1,382 acres (5.5940 km^{2}), including 0.07 acres (0.0003 km^{2}) of water.

== Demographics ==
Historical population
Census	Pop.	Note	%±
1860	598		—
1870	2,360		294.6%
1880	2,626		11.3%
1890	2,480		−5.6%
1900	3,114		25.6%
1910	1,782		−42.8%
1920	552		−69.0%
1930	572		3.6%
1940	706		23.4%
1950	371		−47.5%
1960	250		−32.6%
1970	228		−8.8%
1980	329		44.3%
1990	335		1.8%
2000	515		53.7%
2010	663		28.7%
2020	779		17.5%
U.S. Decennial Census

As of the census of 2000, there were 515 people, 261 households, and 101 families residing in the city. The population density was 273.0 inhabitants per square mile (105.4/km^{2}). There were 394 housing units at an average density of 208.8 per square mile (80.6/km^{2}). The racial makeup of the city was 91.84% White, 0.19% Black or African American, 1.55% Native American, 1.17% Asian, 1.17% Pacific Islander, 2.52% from other races, and 1.55% from two or more races. 9.32% of the population were Hispanic or Latino of any race.

There were 261 households, out of which 17.6% had children under the age of 18 living with them, 26.8% were married couples living together, 8.8% had a female householder with no husband present, and 61.3% were non-families. 43.3% of all households were made up of individuals, and 6.1% had someone living alone who was 65 years of age or older. The average household size was 1.97 and the average family size was 2.76.

In the city, the population was spread out, with 16.5% under the age of 18, 10.1% from 18 to 24, 34.0% from 25 to 44, 30.9% from 45 to 64, and 8.5% who were 65 years of age or older. The median age was 39 years. For every 100 females, there were 115.5 males. For every 100 females age 18 and over, there were 115.0 males.

The median income for a household in the city was $30,921, and the median income for a family was $31,667. Males had a median income of $32,917 versus $25,446 for females. The per capita income for the city was $26,465. About 7.4% of families and 12.3% of the population were below the poverty line, including 8.3% of those under age 18 and 5.2% of those age 65 or over.

== Arts and culture ==
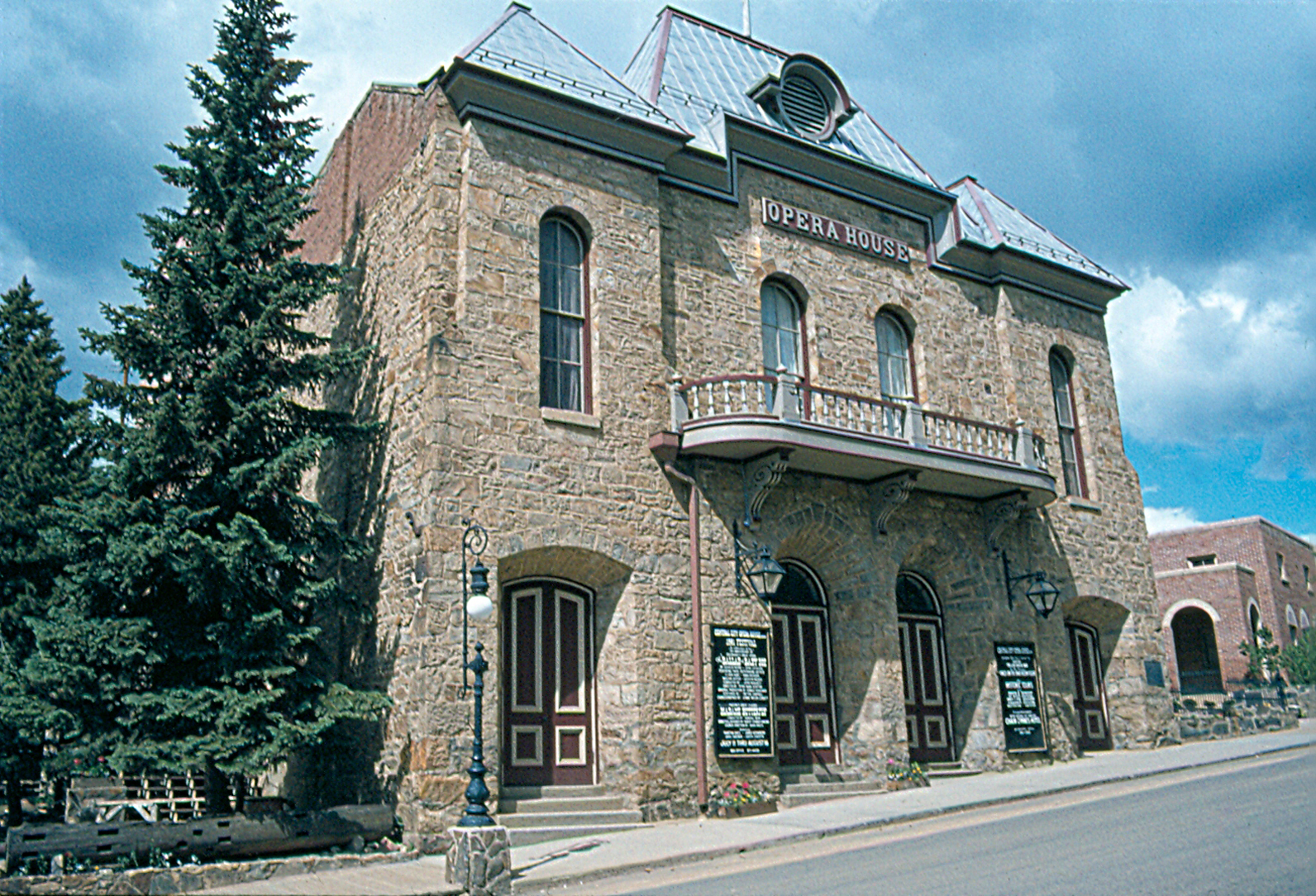
The Central City Opera House in 1982

- The Central City Opera House, designed by Colorado architect Robert S. Roeschlaub, continues to host entertainment during the summer.
- The Teller House, with the painting The Face on the Barroom Floor painted by Herndon Davis.

== Education ==
Central City Public Schools are part of the Gilpin County School District RE-1. The district has one elementary school and one high school, Gilpin County Elementary School and Gilpin County Undivided High School.

== Infrastructure ==
=== Transportation ===
The Black Hawk & Central City Tramway, operated by the cities of Black Hawk and Central City, provides a free shuttle between the two towns. Ramblin Express and Ace Express Coaches provides transportation from Denver.

== See also ==
- Front Range Urban Corridor
- Central City Parkway
- Pike's Peak Gold Rush
- Central City Register-Call
