= Crawford Hill Mansion =

- U.S. National Register of Historic Places
- Colorado State Register of Historic Properties
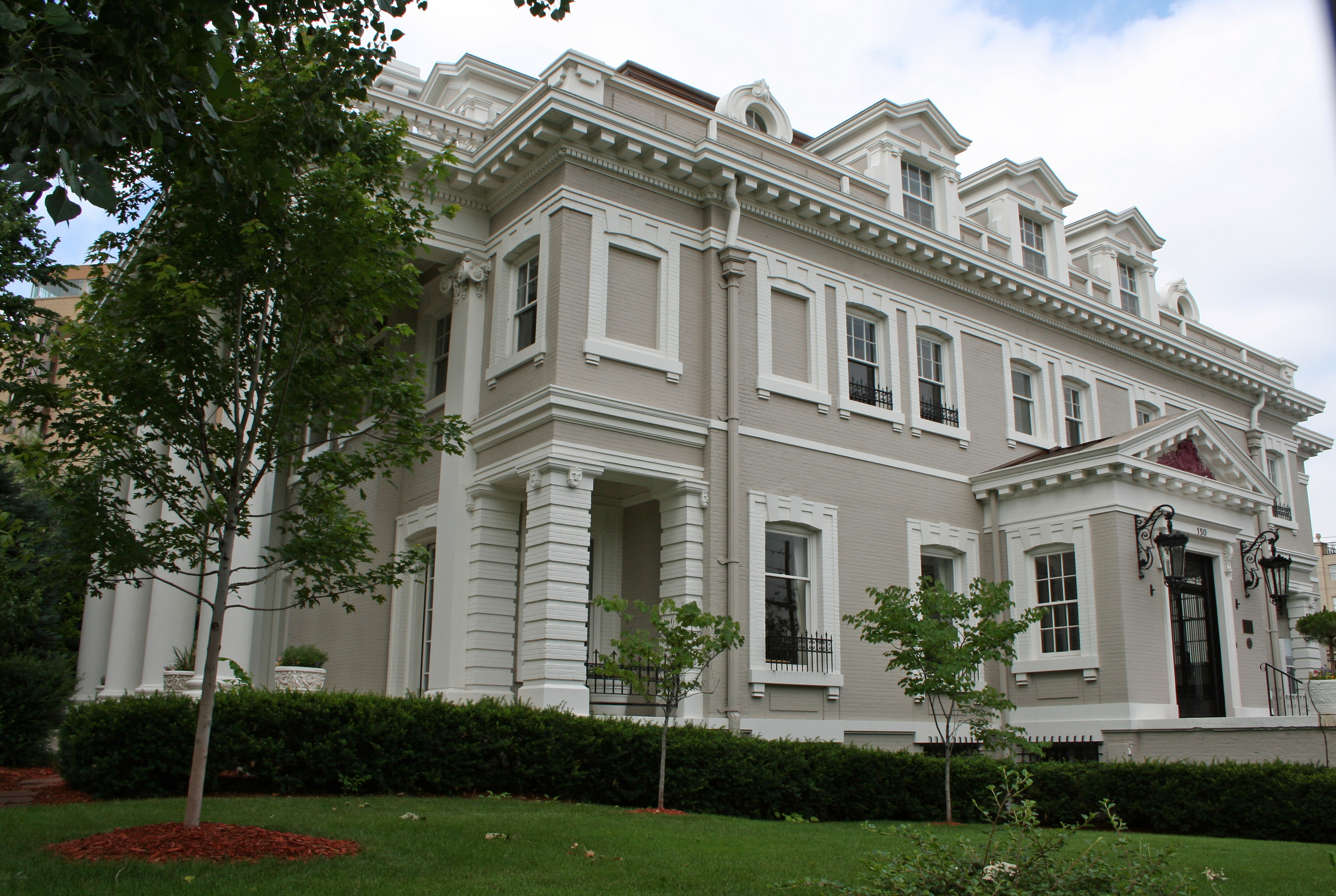

- Location within Colorado Location within the United States
- Interactive map showing the location of Crawford Hill Mansion
- Location: 969 Sherman Street, Denver, Colorado
- Coordinates: 39°43′54.32″N 104°59′6.87″W
- Built: 1906
- Architect: Theodore Boal
- Architectural style: French Renaissance Revival
- NRHP reference No.: 90001417
- CSRHP No.: 5DV.71
- Added to NRHP: September 13, 1990

The Crawford Hill Mansion is a historic house located in Denver, Colorado. It was designated on the National Register of Historic Places on September 13, 1990. The French Renaissance Revival-style mansion is made of brick and sandstone with Ionic columns and a mansard roof. The building is 19,000 square feet.

The house was built by Crawford Hill and his wife Louise Sneed Hill in 1906 at the corner of Tenth and Sherman Streets. The Hill family fortune having been made in the smelting industry. Louise Sneed Hill was the reigning head of Denver society who snubbed Jews and Catholics. The mansion was later home to the Jewish Town Club and in 1990 it was restored as law offices for Haddon, Morgan & Foreman. The restoration resolved issues that arose due to years of neglect and previous poor restoration efforts, and prevented the building from being demolished.

In 2022, the historic house was purchased by the Salazar Family Foundation, which was founded by Rob and Lola Salazar in 1999.
