= Fort Peabody =

- U.S. National Register of Historic Places
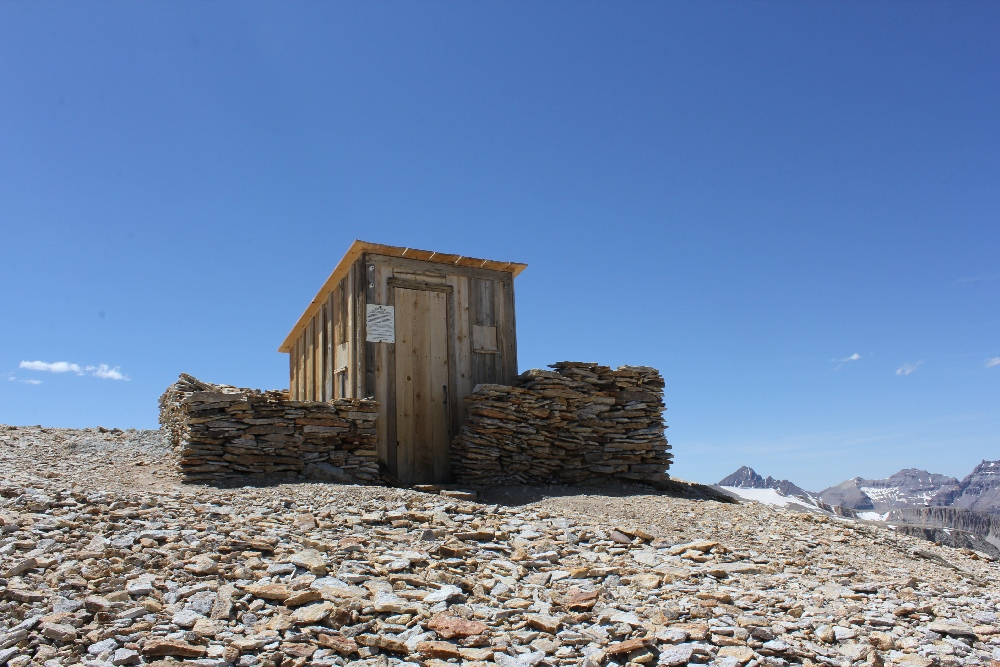
- Fort Peabody
- Location: Imogene Pass, Colorado, USA
- Nearest city: Telluride
- Coordinates: 37°55′50″N 107°43′59″W
- Built: 1904
- Architectural style: Board & batten and dry laid, stacked, tabular native stone
- NRHP reference No.: 05000214
- Added to NRHP: 30 March 2005

Fort Peabody was a military post in southwestern Colorado, situated at 13,365 feet elevation on the county line between Ouray and San Miguel Counties, making it the highest historical post of its kind in the United States. It was added to the National Register of Historic Places on March 30, 2005 as significant to the state and nation's labor history.

== Overview ==
The sentry post was built in 1904 during the height of statewide labor disturbances, when the Western Federation of Miners was managing legal strikes in the San Juan district, Cripple Creek district, Colorado City, and other areas of the West. The Fort Peabody site encompasses the ridge above and southeast of the Imogene Pass road summit, spanning approximately 413 feet northwest to southeast on the lower ridge of Telluride Peak. It was a Colorado National Guard sentry post that included a small guardhouse, a flag mount and what some characterized as a sniper's nest. Until 2010, the site consisted of the remains of a 6' x 8' wood-frame building enclosed in stone walls, a large stone mound, a 5' x 6' depression, and a small pile of rocks all on the ridge top, along with a stone enclosure down the ridge to the northwest, identified as the "sniper nest" or "machine gun nest." In 2010 Fort Peabody was stabilized and restored under the direction of the San Miguel County Open Space and Recreation office and the USDA Forest Service as directed by the National Historic Preservation Act.

== History ==
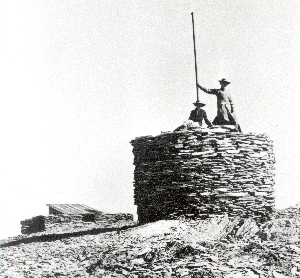
Fort Peabody c. 1910, with two unidentified women on the flag mount and the redoubt in background

The New England Exploration Company of Boston took control of the Smuggler-Union Mining Company in Telluride, Colorado in late 1899, at which time a new manager, Arthur L. Collins, was appointed and new management policies were implemented. Collins required mine employees to board at the mine, to buy their mining supplies from the company, and to work under a by-the-fathom contract system, which precipitated the strike of 1901, led by Western Federation of Miners (WFM) Local No. 63 under the direction of its president, Vincent St. John. Despite a brief riot in the morning of 3 July 1901, the strike was successfully concluded on 6 July, with the Miners' Union and Arthur Collins signing an agreement that ended the contract system, giving employees a full day's wage for a full day's work.

Since the agreement of 1901 was only between the miners and the company, the mill workers demanded similar compensation in 1903, along with an eight-hour day. The new manager of the Smuggler-Union Mining Company, Bulkeley Wells, refused to negotiate, precipitating the strike of 1903–04. Simultaneously mine and mill workers across Colorado made demands for an eight-hour day, fair wages, and the right to work without discrimination. These miners and mill men were members of the WFM, at that time the largest labor union in the Western states, with a membership over 48,000. Refusing the union's demands, mine owners and managers organized as the Mine Operators Association (MOA) in order to combat what the MOA saw as a growing threat to their political power. In response, WFM locals in various affected regions throughout the state went on strike.

In Telluride, Bulkeley Wells and 23 businessmen requested Governor James H. Peabody to send Colorado National Guard troops to San Miguel County in order to break the strike. The Colorado National Guard (CNG) arrived November 24, 1903. Union men were rounded up and forcibly removed from the county. Under Major Zeph Hill martial law was declared January 3, 1904, despite completely peaceful conditions. Hill's daily reports consistently noted that no disturbances occurred. Hill groomed Bulkeley Wells to take his place. Wells created CNG Troop A, First Squadron Cavalry, as a local San Miguel County unit, which Governor Peabody approved in January 1904, making Wells captain. The members were mustered in on January 11. Membership consisted of Wells' Smuggler Mine employees and friends, and cowboys from the west end of the county. These men offered to serve without pay and would furnish their own horses and weapons. Wells paid for their ammunition and rations, housing them in his company's buildings, thereby making it evident that CNG soldiers were in his personal employ.

Wells ordered these Troop A soldiers to construct the sentry post above Imogene Pass for the sole purpose of keeping illegally deported union men and their supporters from re-entering San Miguel County. The stone redoubt was called "Fort Peabody" after the Governor. The National Register of Historic Places nomination document for the site states, "No documentation has been located that indicates this was an official name bestowed by the guard or by Wells, or if the miners dubbed it such in a tongue-in-cheek manner. The redoubt had telephone service to town, giving Wells advanced notice if anyone eluded the sentries and headed toward town. The first sentries at this post were armed with rifles and bayonets and their own sidearms. Two or three men on duty at the post slept in the small guardhouse. A flagpole was mounted on the highpoint above the pass at 13,365 feet and the US Flag was said to be visible from the valley west of Telluride. A small stone shelter was built a few dozen yards below the flagpole mount." According to one historical eye-witness, this smaller stone shelter was the 'sniper nest' where a sentry perched with his Krag-Jorgensen rifle trained on the Imogene Pass road.

Troop A sentries occupied Fort Peabody after Wells took sole command of the district on February 21, 1904. The post was occupied from that time until martial law was revoked in the district on June 15, 1904. Troop A was mustered out in April 1905 at Wells' request, since he was unable to induce the "cow punchers," who made up much of its membership, to attend drills. After this, Wells' mining company employees occupied the post as sentries to thwart union men from using the pass, until about 1908.

== Description of the historical site ==
After abandonment in 1908, Fort Peabody gradually deteriorated due to extreme weather conditions at 13,000 feet. In 2004 it was described in official National Register of Historic Places documents as:

The remains of the guardhouse are slightly down the eastern slope of the ridge. This is a 6' x 8' wood frame construction surrounded on the north, south, west and part of the east sides by stone walls. The surrounding stone wall is of dry laid, stacked, tabular native stone (loose flat rocks from the ridge). The north and south walls are 5' thick; the north stands 2-1/2' to 4' high; the south stands 1-1/2' to 3'high and is falling to grade at the southeast corner. The west wall is 3-1/2' thick and 2' to 2-1/2' high and is collapsing at the southwest corner. The partial east wall is 2' thick and about 3' high.

The wood frame structure within these stone walls was constructed of a 2" x 4" frame with board and batten walls consisting of 1" x 12" boards and 4" battens. All fasteners are wire nails. Although the roof is no longer present, its shape is evident by the standing walls. It had a west-sloping shed roof that was about 7-1/2' high on the east and 6' high on the west. Some of the roof planks were still attached in 1999, but are no longer present. The entrance is on the south end of the east elevation and was 2-1/2'wide previously.

There are window openings on the east ends of the north and south walls. Another smaller window opening is adjacent to the entry on the east wall. These openings do not contain any framing or glazing, although bits of window glass have been found on the ground below. Inside, a 1' x 1-1/2' metal box projects 6" through the north frame wall beneath the window and into the stone wall. It was once used as a small stove. Among the numerous names inscribed on the wooden walls are two dating from 1904: J. C. Reschke and J. E. Verna, members of Troop A under mine manager Captain Bulkeley Wells. Both names are inscribed on the rear inside roof beam.

Originally constructed with the stone walls built up to the windows, this structure was used specifically as a guardhouse or sentry post that was manned by two to three soldiers. At the time of its use, the guardhouse had a telephone line to it.

== Access ==
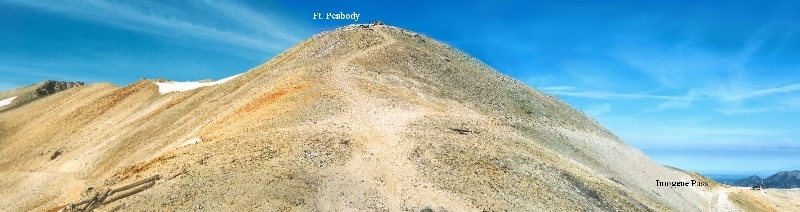
Panorama of Fort Peabody and Imogene Pass

Located above the Imogene Pass summit (13,114 feet) on the Ouray/San Miguel County line, in the Uncompahgre National Forest, Fort Peabody can be accessed from Telluride, Colorado, via the Tomboy Road, a distance of 6.9 miles. The road requires high clearance and four-wheel-drive in the summer. The road is closed in the winter months, because of heavy snow. The historical site can also be approached from the Ouray side, via the Camp Bird Mine road, also a four-wheel-drive road. The USDA Forest Service forbids motorized vehicle access on the foot trail to the sentry post, in order to protect historical materials and the integrity of the site. The climb to the top of the ridge is 250 feet to the breathtaking altitude of 13,365 feet, where the historical Fort Peabody is situated.

== Nomination to the National Register of Historic Places ==
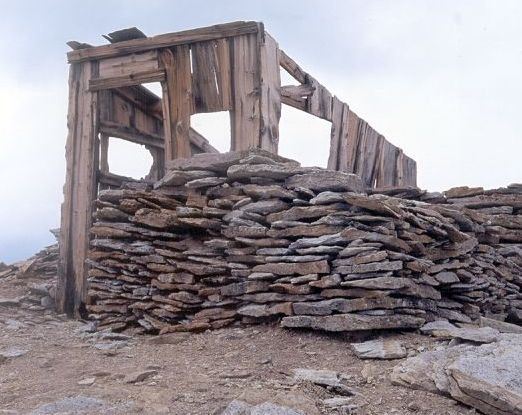
The roofless shell of the CNG redoubt in 1998

The USDA Forest Service acquired the Fort Peabody site from the Idarado Mining Company in 2002. Leigh Ann Hunt, archeologist for the Grand Mesa, Uncompahgre and Gunnison National Forests and the Forest Heritage Program Manager in 2004 said, "It is a miracle this [sentry post] survived to the present day." Hunt said it was essential "to have its historical importance documented in the form of a National Register nomination" which would assist the USDA Forest Service in managing and protecting the site."

The site was surveyed and mapped by Jonathon C. Horn, Principal Investigator at Alpine Archaeological Consultants, Inc. of Montrose, Colorado in 2002. He identified cartridges from the site as consistent with those used by National Guard troops in 1904. Several different calibers were in use, and the .30-40 Krag cartridge with the "W.R.A. Co. 30 U.S.G" headstamp found at the site, indicated "that National Guard troops were using cast off U.S. military rifles," according to Horn.

In 2004 author and historian, MaryJoy Martin, researched, wrote, and presented the Fort Peabody nomination to the National Register of Historic Places. The National Park Service approved her nomination, adding the site to the National Register on 30 March 2005.

"Fort Peabody is probably the only remaining structure exclusively representative of Colorado's labor troubles in 1903-4," Martin states.

With the addition of Fort Peabody on the National Register, the Colorado Historical Society notes that "The site illustrates how quickly and often illegally mine owner management gained control of local government and the Colorado National Guard to run roughshod over the legal, political, and economic rights of union members."

== Stabilization and restoration ==
Initial stabilization of the Fort Peabody sentry post was completed in August 2004 under the direction of the USDA Forest Service, the crew consisting of historian MaryJoy Martin and three members of the Ouray County Historical Society, Don Paulson, George Moore, and Walt Rule. In June 2009 the Telluride Open Space and Recreation Program and San Miguel County Commissioner Art Goodtimes discussed signage and stabilization for the site, but difficult logistics threatened the project, since the site was above 13,000 feet in elevation.

In 2010, a historic preservation project conducted by San Miguel County with authorization from and direction by the Grand Mesa, Uncompaghre, and Gunnison National Forest (GMUG) personnel was undertaken. During excavation of the site, the work crew found numerous ammunition shells, a silver hair pin, an old piece of newspaper, coal, leather pieces, glass fragments, and a fire poker. All artifacts were turned over to the USDA Forest Service.

Stabilization and restoration of the historic Fort Peabody guardhouse was financed through San Miguel County's Open Space and Recreation Fund. "The Forest Service helped ensure that the steps outlined in the National Historic Preservation Act were followed, and that standards established by the Secretary of the Interior for stabilization work were adhered to throughout this complex project," Leigh Anne Hunt of the USDA Forest Service states.
