= Central City Register-Call =

Newspaper published in Black Hawk, Colorado

Weekly Register-Call
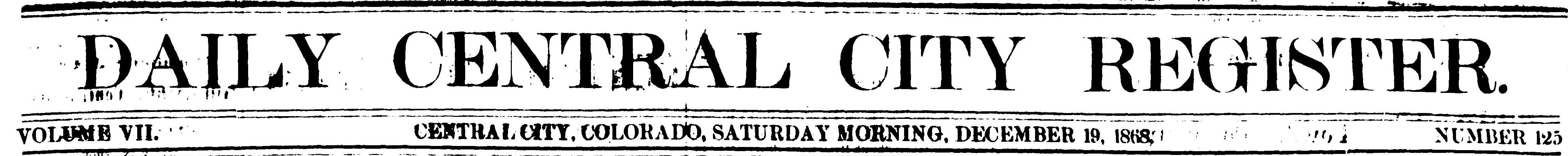
- Type: Weekly newspaper
- Owner: Robert Sweeney
- Founder: Alfred Thompson
- Managing editor: Becky Osterwald
- Founded: 1862 (as the Miner's Register)
- Language: English
- Headquarters: Black Hawk, Colorado
- OCLC number: 13162014
- Website: registercall.com

The Register-Call is a weekly newspaper covering Central City and Black Hawk, Colorado. It is the oldest continuously published paper in the state following the closure of the Rocky Mountain News.

== History ==
Alfred Thompson of Glenwood, Iowa, travelled to Colorado for the Pike's Peak gold rush and started the Miner's Register, a tri-weekly, on July 26, 1862. The first issue was produced with a Washington handpress, and lawyer David C. Collier acted as editor.

Thompson sold the paper to Collier, Hugh Glenn and George A. Wells on April 9, 1863. The firm name was Collier, Glenn & Co. Wells later bought out Glenn, who in 1865 sold out to Frank Hall, and thus the firm was renamed to Collier & Hall. In 1873, Collier sold out to W.W. Whipple, and the firm was changed to Hall & Whipple.

In 1876, Whipple sold out to Hall. In 1877, Hall sold the paper to James A. Smith and Den Marlow. In February 1878, Halsey M. Rhoads bought the Register. On February 16, 1878, George M. Laird and Den Marlow founded the Evening Call with Col. J.S. Dormer as editor. The group used a foot-power Gordon press. On May 27, 1878, Laird and Marlow bought the Register at a Sheriff Sale and merged the two to form the Register-Call. In 1895, Marlow died at age 48.

Laird was left as the sole owner until his death in 1936 at age 88. He published the paper for 58 years and never missed an issue. He was also a big supporter of the Central City Opera House. Upon his death, his son Rae L. Laird succeeded him at the paper. In 1970, after 34 years as publisher, R.L. Laird sold the Register-Call to Central City Mayor William C. Russell Jr., and died a year later at age 81. In 1991, Viola O. Laird, who helped her husband publish the paper, died at age 95. In 2009, Russell died at age 93, having owned the paper for 39 years.

David Spellman then purchased the Register Call from Russell's estate and then merged it with the Gilpin County News owned by Aaron Storms. Both Spellman and Storms were co-publishers of the consolidated publication called the Weekly Register Call. Storms would act as editor while Spellman would be a silent partner. The newspaper sale was controversial as Spellman, who was mayor of Black Hawk, had previously been critical of the paper due to its reporting on him and some his ownership as conflict of interest. In 2021, Robert "Bob" Sweeney bought the Register Call.

== Building ==
In 1862, the newspaper was originally headquartered at a newly constructed building at 109 Eureka Street. In 1864, a third floor was constructed for use by the local Masonic lodge. In 1890, the lodge purchased the lower two floors for $6,000. The space was then leased back to the paper. In 1874, a fire destroyed most of Central City, but the paper's building was one of the few structures to survive. In 1970, the Colorado chapter of Sigma Delta Chi designated the property as a historic site in journalism. In 1991, a scene in the TV film "Perry Mason: The Case of the Glass Coffin" was filmed in the printing room. In 1996, the Register-Call relocated to 220 Spring Street. In 2022, the Gilpin County Historical Society opened the Weekly Register-Call Print Shop Museum at the building.
