= Citizens' Alliance =

State and local anti-union organizations in the early 20th-century United States

Cover of 1935 Citizens Alliance of Minneapolis pamphlet

Citizens' Alliances were state and local anti-trade union organizations prominent in the United States of America during the first decade of the 20th century. The Citizens' Alliances were closely related to employers' associations but allowed participation of a broad range of sympathetic citizens in addition to those employers apt to be affected by strikes. Originating in the American state of Ohio as the "Modern Order of Bees," the Citizens' Alliance movement spread westwards, playing a particularly important role in labor relations in the states of Colorado and California. Citizens' Alliance groups often worked in tandem with smaller but better financed employers' organizations interested in establishing or maintaining open shop labor conditions, including the Mine Owners' Associations (MOA) or the National Association of Manufacturers (NAM).

== Organizational history ==
=== General outline ===
The Citizens' Alliance movement originated in Dayton, Ohio circa 1900 as a secret society called the "Modern Order of Bees," also known colloquially as the "Hooly-Goolies." The group was viewed as an adjunct of a local employers' association, with membership open not only to the narrow circle of employers, but also to any citizen who was not a member of a trade union.

The term "Citizens' Alliance" was adopted from the name of a political organization established more than a decade earlier. The populist National Citizens' Industrial Alliance of 1891 sought to bolster the rights of working people; the employers' Citizens' Alliance of 1903 sought to curtail union power.

If the National Association of Manufacturers (NAM) represented the large industrialists, the Citizens' Alliance groups were composed of smaller local associations. These entities were united in the belief that organized labor was "evil and un-American." Within three years it was perceived that the "educational campaigns" of the NAM and the CIA had reversed public opinion and ended the growth of unionism. At the 1906 CIA convention Charles W. Post, the breakfast cereal manufacturer, declared that,

Two years ago the press and pulpit were delivering platitudes about the oppression of the working man. Now this has all been changed since it has been discovered that the enormous Labor Trust is the heaviest oppressor of the independent workingman as well as the common American Citizen."

=== Methods ===
Citizens' Alliance groups also sometimes conducted boycotts in an attempt to isolate and influence employers who sought labor peace through the recognition of unions and collective bargaining. By way of example, in May 1903 representatives of the Denver Citizens' Alliance and the local manufacturer's association conducted an organized campaign to visit local employers with unionized work-forces in order to force them to abrogate their labor contracts. Deadlines were issued and boycotts threatened to be visited upon those firms failing to heed to Citizens' Alliance's warnings.

Such hardball tactics drew condemnation in the local press, with the Denver Post opining:

The Citizens' Alliance and the employers' association have adopted one of the very methods of unionism that they condemn so vehemently — the submit or be destroyed method — to bring offending employers in line. They certainly can no longer wonder where laboring men get their ideas for pushing strikes and boycotts. If these steps had been taken by unions, all the better class, so-called, in the city would be loud in denouncing them."

Boycotts imposed by local Citizens' Alliance groups hit both sides of the production chain, including both organized refusals to sell components to and organized refusals to buy finished products from subject firms.

=== National organization ===
The various locally organized Citizens' Alliances and employers' associations were joined into a unified national organization by a convention held in October 1903 in Chicago, which launched the Citizens' Industrial Association of America.

== State-level activities ==
=== Alabama ===
==== Birmingham ====
A Citizens' Alliance group was formed in Birmingham, Alabama in August 1903.

=== California ===
==== San Francisco ====
The year 1900 saw dramatic growth of trade unionism in San Francisco, then the largest city on the Pacific Coast. By the middle of that year, the California Bureau of Labor Statistics counted no fewer than 90 trade unions in the city of San Francisco and an additional 24 in neighboring Alameda County on the East side of San Francisco Bay. The Bureau of Labor Statistics estimated a total union membership of 20,000 for San Francisco — a significant percentage of the city's approximately 340,000 residents — as well as 3,000 more in Oakland and Berkeley of the East Bay. Moreover, while these mid-year figures may have represented something of an overcount due to methodological errors by the BLS, the trade union movement was unquestionably experiencing rapid growth and may well have exceeded these estimates by the end of the year.

The demands of these growing unions for a shorter working day and higher wages put pressure upon local employers. A series of strikes swept the city, the most bitter of which being a battle between the San Francisco Building Trades Council and Bay Area planing-mill employers attempting to establish the 8-hour day. A newly unified Bakers' Union won a six-day work week, retail clerks unionized and campaigned for 6 pm closings, and unionized electrical workers and longshoremen won wage gains as the result of strike actions. Local garment workers of the Cloakmakers' Union conducted an effective boycott against three local manufacturers, gaining the cooperation of retail stores and maintaining pickets against the involved companies.

Many employers, interested in maintaining the status quo in terms of hours and wages, sought to organize themselves against their increasingly organized workers. This took concrete form in April 1901 when there was established the Employers' Association of San Francisco. This organization maintained strict secrecy as to its size, membership composition, financing, and goals, but it emerged before the public eye in May, when it first attempted to exert organized opposition in San Francisco labor disputes.

The secrecy employed by the Employers' Association created public image of a mysterious and omnipotent force; in reality the group included only a small minority of San Francisco's employers. Those which did participate, however, were among the city's largest and best-financed, and new members were required to post financial guarantees of their observance of the policies advanced by the organization. It was estimated that even by May 1901 a war chest of $150,000 had been amassed for the organized fight against trade unionism — a total which union leaders believed to have doubled or tripled by the end of that first summer. A series of increasingly bitter strikes followed, with labor further pushing the envelope with the establishment of the Union Labor Party that same year, followed by the electoral capture of City Hall.

It was in this context that the Citizens' Alliance movement emerged in California, as a component of the anti-union reaction to growth of organized labor in the state's urban center of San Francisco. The first branch of the Citizens' Alliance was established in the city sometime in the winter of 1903–04. The organization, which worked hand-in-glove with the Employers' Association of San Francisco, was the local reflection of a national campaign on behalf of the open shop and drew active interest and support from the National Association of Manufacturers and other industrial leaders eager to see organized labor's West coast stronghold deconstructed.

At the time of the establishment of San Francisco Citizens' Alliance, a critical strategic decision was made: rather than making use of well-connected local employers to staff the organization, professional anti-union functionaries were imported. The organization also made the determination to engage in political action in an attempt to wrench the city administration of San Francisco from the hands of the Union Labor Party. Although not initially clear at the time, these two decisions had the unanticipated effect of increasing the unity of the labor movement and thereby helping to assure a third term of ULP control in the election of 1905.

The San Francisco Citizens' Alliance branch claimed to have a membership of 16,000 in the fall of 1904. As such, it was the largest branch of the organization in the state. Membership in the organization was bolstered by pressure said to have been exerted by employers on their managerial staff to join the group. Additionally, local offices of the Chamber of Commerce made efforts to drum up support for the group among their membership.

==== Other cities ====
In addition to its San Francisco branch, the Citizens' Alliance also maintained local organizations in Los Angeles (purportedly the largest group in the nation relative to size of the city); Stockton and Bakersfield in the Central Valley; Oakland, San Jose, and Palo Alto in the Bay Area; and Fort Bragg on the North Coast.

The Los Angeles Citizens' Alliance branch was notably headed by Harrison Gray Otis, publisher of the Los Angeles Times and well known as one of the most bitter opponents of organized labor in the state.

=== Colorado ===
==== Denver ====
James C. Craig became president of the Citizens' Alliance of Denver, which enrolled nearly 3,000 individual and corporate members within three weeks after its creation. It had a war chest of nearly $20,000. The organization had a "clandestine character", and all the inner workings of the organization were enshrouded "in deep secrecy", raising the possibility that "the group might take extralegal action against all organized labor."

Membership was restricted to persons, firms, associations, or corporations owning property, or engaged in business in Colorado, with members of labor organizations specifically excluded. Local Citizens' Alliance organizations throughout Colorado made up the Colorado Citizens' Alliance, which formed a close partnership with the Mine Owners' Association and with the Colorado National Guard. Together, these groups engaged in widespread extra-legal activities in the Cripple Creek gold mining district, where the Western Federation of Miners (WFM) had declared a strike. The Colorado Citizens' Alliance:

...claimed its purpose was for protection and to resist the unlawful demands of the unions, with 'unlawful' meaning anything the unions requested. The thinly veiled objective was the eradication of the Miners' Union and, on the state level, the obliteration of the entire WFM.

==== Telluride ====
During the 1903 strike in Telluride, the San Miguel County Citizens' Alliance circulated a petition accusing union leaders of the murder of William J. Barney, an out-of-town worker who had walked away from his job as a mine guard after only a week. A grand jury had concluded there was no evidence a crime had been committed, but members of the Alliance ignored that conclusion. When the alleged victim appeared in court seeking a divorce one year after he'd disappeared, at least two Alliance members discovered he was still alive. That knowledge didn't serve their purpose so they ignored it.

Accusations that the strikers were a threat to mines, mills, power stations, reservoirs, train trestles, power lines, and trams were used to justify occupation by the national guard. The real purpose was protection of strikebreakers. The Citizens' Alliance helped to decide who was arrested and who walked free, and union sympathies were the determining factor. Some union arrestees were brutally treated, with pistol blows to the head and rifle blows to the body. But generally, union men in Telluride were too well-behaved, and new criminal offenses had to be invented. For example, men simply standing together were guilty of conspiracy. "Offensive carriage" became a crime when union men "disturbed the peace and quiet" by the way they stood and walked. Undercover Pinkerton spy George W. Riddell was arrested on such a charge with a group of strikers and determined during incarceration, perhaps to no one's real surprise, that the miners had no plans of the sort with which they'd been accused.

The Alliance in Telluride advertised that there was no strike, and, with the militia, they "acted as a fortified employment agency for the mines." Meanwhile, union miners could have pockets stuffed with money, but were still found guilty of vagrancy and expelled. Finally, the Citizens' Alliance in Telluride acted as a vigilante mob, issuing itself national guard rifles and rounding up the remaining sixty-five union men and supporters late on an icy night. Some of the detainees were without shoes and shirt, most without coats or hats. About fourteen of them were injured, at least one was robbed, and all were forced out of town.

==== Cripple Creek ====
In Cripple Creek the Citizens' Alliance organizations of Colorado willingly participated in the suspension of the Bill of Rights by the National Guard. To crush the union, its leaders were arrested without cause and either thrown in bullpens, or banished. Prisoners who won habeas corpus cases were released in court and then immediately re-arrested. A local newspaper was placed under military censorship, with all union-friendly information prohibited. Freedom of assembly was not allowed. The right to bear arms was suspended—citizens were required to give up their firearms and their ammunition. Even "loitering or strolling about" was criminalized in an effort to crush the union. After spasms of violence — some of them brutal crimes that were never properly investigated — the Citizens' Alliance and their allies wrecked union halls throughout the district, and looted four union cooperative stores. Ultimately, many died and many families were torn apart in the successful effort to expel the union by force of arms.

The struggle between employers and employees was viewed as a relationship imbued with class interests. Craig declared that one purpose of the Denver Citizens' Alliance was "correcting and preventing pernicious class legislation." And the Cripple Creek District Citizens' Alliance delivered resolutions to the Colorado Governor which starkly expressed their goal of "controlling the lawless classes."

Craig wrote that the Citizens' Alliance movement "has completely counteracted the terror and influence of the boycott, the unlawful and un-American weapon of the unions." In order to accomplish the goal of counteracting union boycotts, the Citizens' Alliance in Colorado used boycotts of its own. In hiring, they arranged for employers to boycott union members. They arranged for the Denver Advertisers' Association to boycott newspapers that expressed disapproval of the Citizens' Alliance and the Mine Owners' Association. They arranged for Cripple Creek newspapers to refuse to advertise the store of the Interstate Mercantile Company, which had bought out the stock of goods in a Western Federation of Miners store that had been ransacked by a mob.

=== Minnesota ===
==== Minneapolis ====
Employment office operated by the Citizens Alliance in 1924

Otis Briggs, Owen Kinnard, Albert W. Strong, and John F. Wilcox formed the Minneapolis Citizens Alliance in 1903 and each served at various times as its leaders until 1936. It grew out of an employers' group that had defeated a machinists' strike in 1901. The Alliance's goal was to keep Minneapolis an open shop town. To do this the Alliance brought together more than 200 manufacturers, milling companies, and banks. Most members ran small or medium-sized businesses but large employers, most of all, were the main beneficiaries of this scheme and supplied the money behind the Alliance's power. It sought to keep unions out of Minneapolis workplaces through an open-shop campaign. From 1903 to 1917, alliance members defeated all strikes against them. The alliance's influence reached Saint Paul and Duluth, where employers formed their own less militant alliances.

In 1903 David M. Parry, president of the National Association of Manufacturers, and later to become the first president of the Citizens' Industrial Alliance, spoke at a Minneapolis Commercial Club reception. He stated the true nature of the United States business community's drive against union labor, "I believe we should endeavor to strike at the root of the matter, and that is to be found in the wide spread socialistic sentiment among certain classes of people." and declared "Law and order must be enforced and that class domination over industry is not going to be tolerated."

In his book A Union Against Unions: The Minneapolis Citizens Alliance and Its Fight Against Organized Labor, William Millikan writes "in a brief moment of candor, Parry revealed the simple fact that the Citizens Alliance would attempt to conceal from the public for three decades that the open shop movement was a war between the owners of American industry and the working class."

Alliance leaders focused on defeating organized labor by establishing anti-union policies and legislation at the city, state, and federal levels. They sought to accomplish this, in part, by helping to incorporate the Minnesota Employers' Association (MEA). The Alliance spread anti-union messages. They framed unionism as a threat to individual freedom, and economically harmful and unions as radical and un-American. They kept tabs on workers, and blocked union supporters from getting hired. The Alliance supported employer-directed alternatives to independent unions to keep worker representation under management's influence. During strikes member companies would refuse to negotiate. They would fire strikers then hire non-union workers to replace them. Businesses under a strike received financial help from other members of the Alliance. Alliance lawyers asked courts to issue orders against picketing. The Alliance ran the Free Employment Bureau and Job-a-Week program, employment agencies that placed non-union workers with employers that opposed unions. They also worked with Dunwoody Institute and other trade agencies to place workers in nonunion companies. The Alliance gathered information through private agencies, the Minneapolis police, and the Hennepin County sheriff. It also placed its own agents inside most unions in the city. Between 1918 and 1920, its membership reached about 700. By the start of the 1930s the Alliance had attracted national attention for making Minneapolis an open-shop town. Yale sociologist Charles R. Walker studied the Alliance. He wrote that it "appeared to all observers to be one of the most powerful and efficiently organized employers' associations in the United States."

Mill owners joined the Alliance in 1903 as workers sought an 8-hour workday for flour loaders. With the Alliance's support, the owners rejected the demand and refused to negotiate. When Mayor James C. Haynes called for the mill owners to accept arbitration to settle the strike, but Alliance president Edmund J. Phelps replied, "There is nothing to arbitrate at present. Pillsbury, Washburn Crosby, and Northwestern Consolidated fired strikers and then hired workers to replace them. Washburn–Crosby turned a former mill used for storage into lodging for workers to live there and not have to cross picket lines. The strike's defeat in 1903 weakened the union and helped mill owners keep unions out of most mill jobs.

The Alliance lost power during the Great Depression. U.S. labor laws, Minnesota governor Floyd B. Olson's administration, and union organizing challenged its efforts to keep unions out of workplaces. The Minneapolis Teamsters strikes of 1934 weakened the alliance. Strikes at Flour City Ornamental Iron Works and Strutwear Knitting Company in 1935 challenged its power. Minneapolis employers signed union contracts in 1936 and 1937. The alliance renamed itself Associated Industries of Minneapolis. It adopted a constitution recognizing workers' right to negotiate as a group and to strike.

=== Ohio ===
==== Dayton ====
In an effort to curb the local union movement in Dayton, Ohio, a Dayton Employers' Association was established in 1900.

=== Washington ===
==== Seattle ====
Formation of the Citizens' Alliance of Seattle was announced in the Seattle Star late in September 1904. Annual dues were set at $31 per year, with a $1 initiation fee and headquarters opened in the city's Lumber Exchange Building. Jacob Furth of the Seattle Electric Company was selected as the local organization's first president, with other officers coming from the managements of other local commercial concerns.

The Citizens' Alliance of Seattle was launched behind a five-point program that promised support of the open shop, opposition to sympathetic strikes and boycotts as well as picketing and other forms of "unlawful coercion and persecution," the enforcement of existing laws, and the unfettered use of apprentices.

The anti-union employers' organization claimed to be organizing in self-defense amidst an ongoing effort to expand the organized labor movement, with five organizers of the American Federation of Labor said to be already present in the city of Seattle with three more said to be en route.

=== Wisconsin ===
==== Beloit ====
A Citizens' Alliance was organized in Beloit, Wisconsin in June 1903. The group claimed success in breaking one of the most influential trade unions in that city, with the Beloit Teamsters' Union surrendering its charter in February 1904.

== See also ==
- History of union busting in the United States
- Anti-union violence
- American Protective League
- Italian Hall disaster

== Publications ==
- Declaration of Principles, Platform, Constitution and By-laws of the National Citizens' Industrial Alliance and Proceedings of the National Assembly held at Topeka, January 13 to 17, 1891. Alliance Tribune, 1891.
- Quam, Lois; Rachleff, Peter J. (Fall 1986). "Keeping Minneapolis An Open-Shop Town: The Citizens Alliance in the 1930s" (PDF). Minnesota History. 50 (3). Minnesota Historical Society: 105–117.
- Millikan, William (2001). A Union Against Unions: The Minneapolis Citizens Alliance and Its Fight Against Organized Labor. Minnesota Historical Society Press.
- Frame, Robert (2026). Making Mill City Flour and Fortune in Minneapolis. University of Minnesota Press.
