= George W. Riddell =

George W. Riddell was a Pinkerton labor spy who infiltrated the Western Federation of Miners (WFM) in Telluride, and later became president of the Eureka miners union in Utah. Riddell was forced to resign when Morris Friedman published the book The Pinkerton Labor Spy in 1907.

Riddell was covertly identified as agent No. 36 in the Pinkerton Agency, which charged $7,000 to the Telluride Mine Owners' Association for his services over a period of two years. He was tasked with discovering an "Inner Circle" of conspirators in the WFM union, but he found no trace of any such group. The Inner Circle theory had been promoted by James McParland, the head of Pinkerton's Denver division. Alleged evidence for the existence of a group of conspirators were the actual murder of Arthur L. Collins, and the alleged murder of mine guard William J. Barney.
