= Hidee Gold Mine =

Coordinates: 39.787058°N 105.501044°W

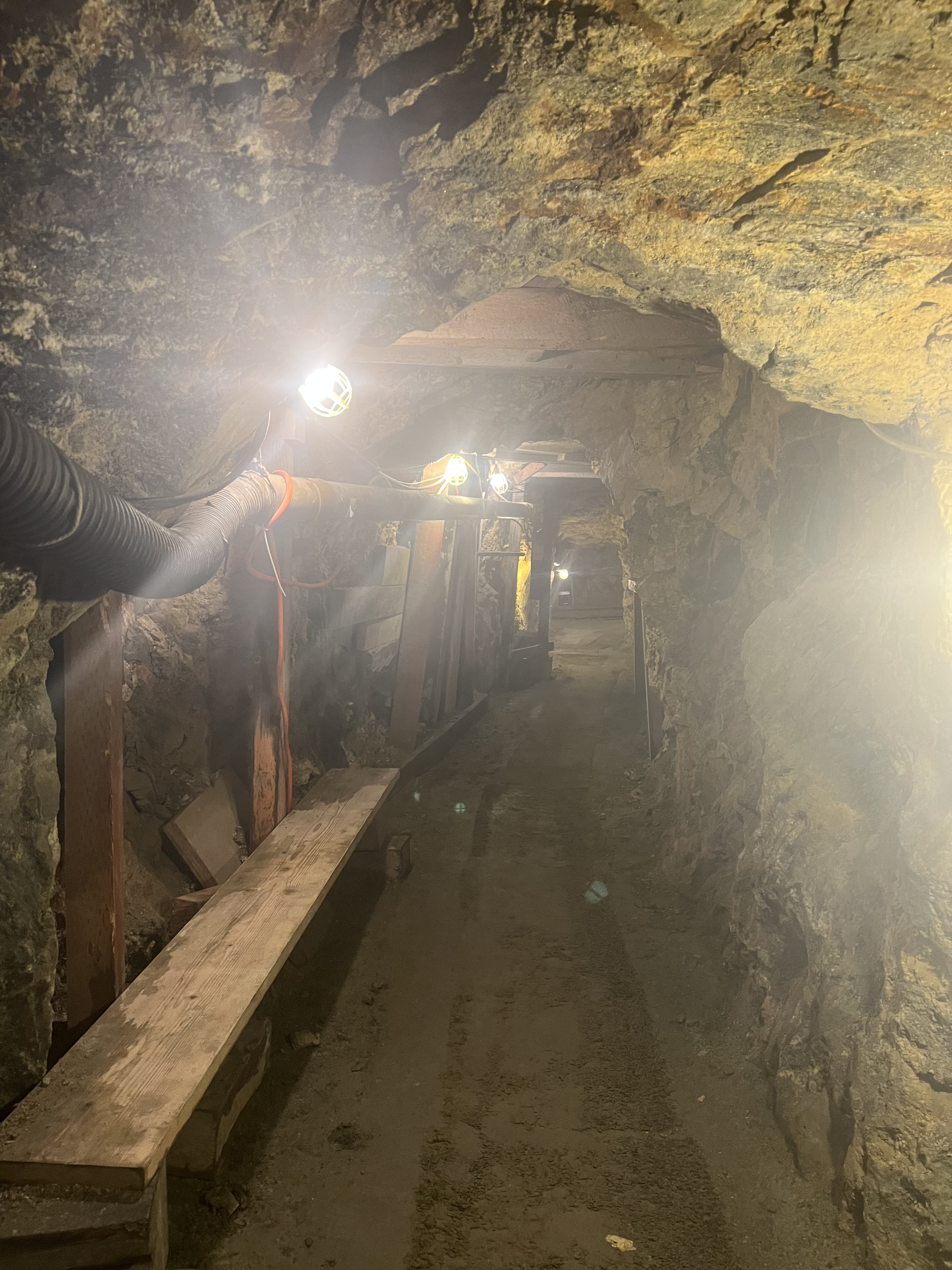
Inside the Hidee Gold Mine

The Hidee Gold Mine is a former gold mine in Gilpin County, Colorado, United States. The Hidee sits in the heart of Virginia Canyon - Glory Hole Area, reputed to be the richest square mile on earth.

The Hidee Gold Mine was submitted for patent in 1896 and first accessed by a shaft atop the ridge. In the 1980s it was opened via the walk-in entry for educational tours.

It is one of the tourist attractions in and near the town as a result of the efforts of the local residents, and the Hidee Gold Mine company which worked to recreate the history of mining near Black Hawk, Colorado. There are tours of the mine, which explain the methods that were used both in the past as well as the present. Also during these tours, tourists are given a feel of being a miner, by including a stop at a gold ore vein where tourists use a single-jack (one-handed) hammer and chisel (provided) to chip a gold ore sample loose, which they are allowed to keep as a souvenir.
