= Nathaniel P. Hill =

American mining executive, academic, and politician

Nathaniel Peter Hill
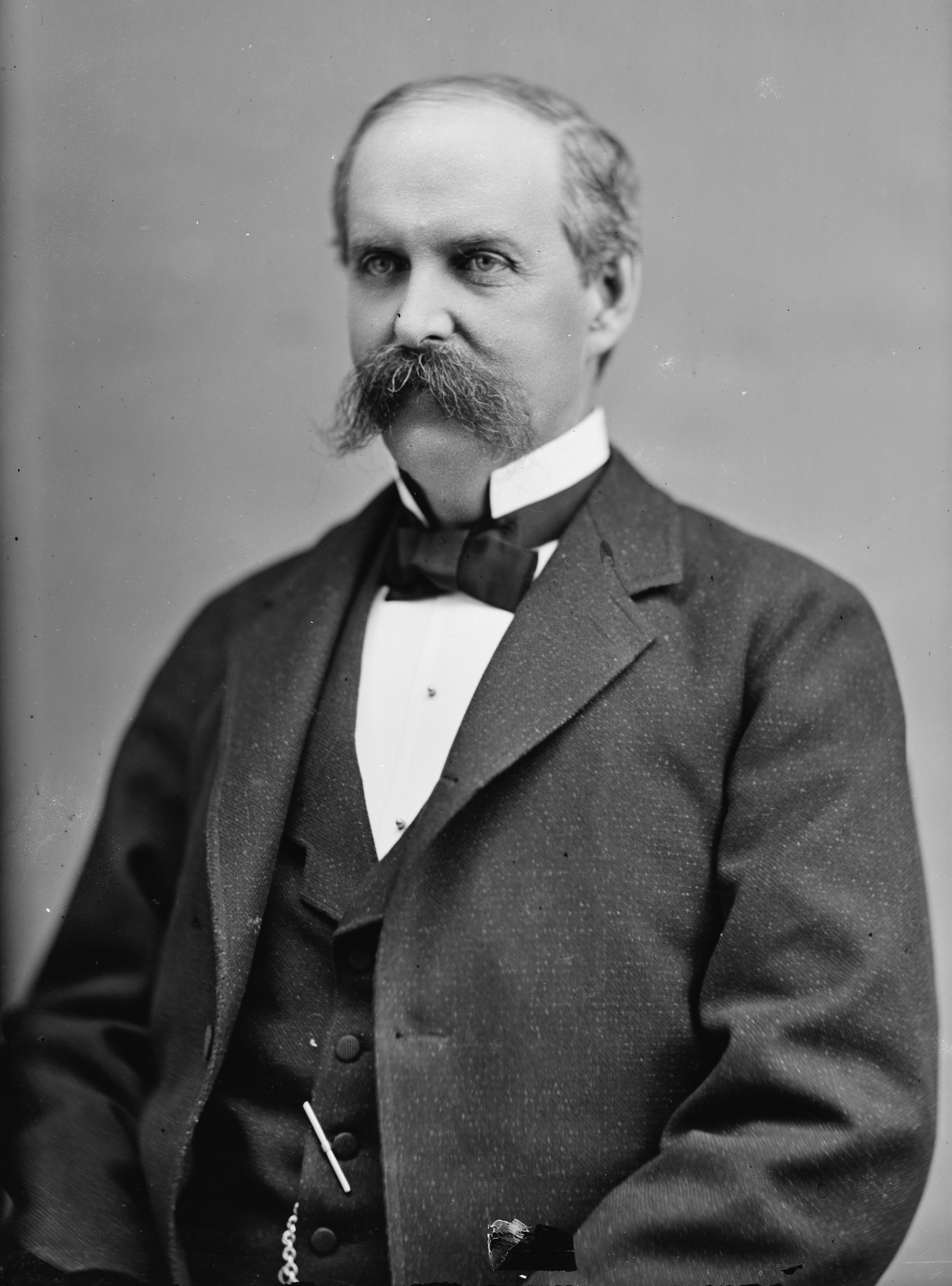

United States Senator from Colorado
- In office March 4, 1879 – March 3, 1885
- Preceded by: Jerome B. Chaffee
- Succeeded by: Henry M. Teller

Personal details
- Born: February 18, 1832 Montgomery, New York
- Died: May 22, 1900 (aged 68) Denver, Colorado
- Resting place: Fairmount Cemetery (Denver, Colorado)
- Party: Republican
- Education: Brown University

Nathaniel Peter Hill (February 18, 1832 – May 22, 1900) was a professor at Brown University, a mining executive and engineer, and a politician, including serving in the United States Senate. Originally from the state of New York, he came to Colorado following the Pike's Peak Gold Rush to try his hand at mining. He traveled to Europe to investigate ways to smelt ore and developed processes to make mining more profitable. He was the mayor of Denver before becoming a United States Senator.

== Early life ==
Born in Montgomery, Orange County, New York, at the Nathaniel Hill Brick House (now a museum). He was a descendant of Thomas Hale, one of the first settlers in Newbury from England in 1635.

Hill took over the family farm in Montgomery, until he was 21, while his eldest brother, James King, attended Yale University. During this time he was a part-time student at Montgomery Academy. He graduated from Brown University in 1856.

== Career ==
=== Educator ===
He was an instructor and later professor of chemistry at Brown University from 1856 to 1864. He was the first to bring the idea of laboratories to Brown, which he copied from other schools, mostly in Europe.

=== Mining ===
His scientific eligibility led him to be invited by cotton manufacturer Colonel William Reynolds to search for mining areas in the West. The greater salary enticed him to journey West. Hill traveled to Colorado in the spring of 1864 to investigate mineral resources. In his search, he traveled alone and with fellow scientists and entrepreneurs. He returned home to Providence after having accomplished little, where he officially resigned from his teaching position and vowed to devote the rest of his life to the search for gold.

Upon his return to the West, he bought several gold mines, but soon ran into financial difficulties because the smelting techniques at the time were resulting in low yields. The Sterling Gold Mining Company and the Hill Gold Mining Company were established around Central City in Colorado. The preferred method of extraction in those days was stamp milling. A stamp mill consisted of heavy iron blocks attached to wooden or steel rods that rose and fell in accordance with a horizontal beam. After the ore containing the gold was crushed sufficiently, the resulting dust was run over copper plates containing mercury, which formed an alloy from which the gold could be more easily extracted. Once miners got past the upper ore deposits, they found that the lower ores contained large amounts of complex sulfides. As a result, a precipitous drop in the recovery rate of gold occurred. Failed attempts at introducing alternative methods of extracting gold contributed to the tensions and financial turmoil of the West, until Hill popularized the method of smelting.

Accordingly, he spent a portion of 1865 and 1866 in Swansea, Wales and Freiberg, Saxony studying metallurgy, and returned to the United States with a perfected method of smelting. Hill learned while abroad, especially in the coal mines, that the best method was that of copper matte. In this method - known as the Swansea process - copper sulfide ore was mixed with gold and silver ore and the copper acted as a vehicle to hold the gold and silver. After returning, he took up a permanent residence in Black Hawk, Colorado. While in Blackhawk, he had the opportunity to work with James E. Lyon, an entrepreneur who he had met on his first trip to Colorado, and who had erected the first real smelter there. However, his findings surpassed those of Lyon. He capitalized on the experience and with his professional training as a chemist and the knowledge gained in Europe, founded the Boston & Colorado Smelting Company, which encompassed numerous ventures aside from mining. Through the funding of numerous capitalists, Hill worked alongside popular metallurgists to oversee the smelting process and thus rose in wealth and popularity.

=== Politician ===
Hill was mayor of Black Hawk in 1871 and a member of the Territorial council in 1872 and 1873. He moved to Denver in 1873 and engaged in smelting and the real estate business, and was elected as a Republican to the U.S. Senate and served from March 4, 1879, to March 3, 1885. He ran on a platform of Republican ideals and free silver whose interests lay in the establishment of a monopolistic society and the implementation of a federal telegraph system. Hill also warned against the corruption of the American political system by special interests like monopolies. While in the Senate, he was chairman of the Committee on Mines and Mining (Forty-seventh Congress), Committee on Post Office and Post Roads (Forty-eighth Congress), and was involved in the International Monetary Commission. His defeat by Henry M. Teller in 1885 ended his political career. Nevertheless, he remained politically active in other ways, purchasing The Denver Republican and using it to further the causes he had fought for in the Senate.

== Personal life ==
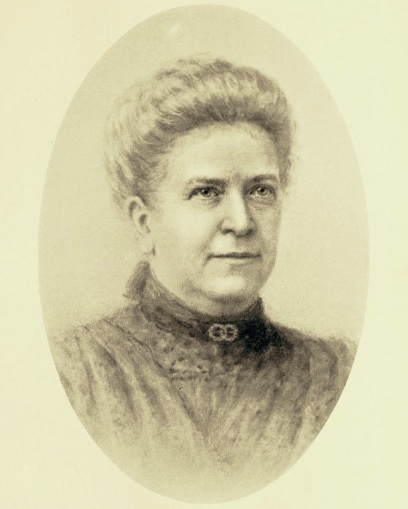
Alice Hale Hill, Representative Women of Colorado, 1914. She was "a force" in charitable and social works, a charter member of several organizations, president of the YWCA, and hostess during her husband's political career.

He married Alice Hale of Providence, Rhode Island, on July 26, 1860 (she was born January 19, 1840, and died July 19, 1908). Alice's father was Isaac Hale, born in the town of Newbury County of Essex, Massachusetts on Sept. 17, 1807. Her mother, Harriet Johnson, daughter of David Johnson and Lucy Towne, was born in the town of Newbury, VT, July 29, 1814. David Johnson was a son of Col. Thomas Johnson, who distinguished himself during the Revolutionary War.

Hill and Alice had three children, Crawford (who was married to Louise Sneed Hill), Isabel, and Gertrude. He died in Denver on May 22, 1900, from a stomach disease and was interred in Fairmount Cemetery.

U.S. Senate
Preceded by Jerome B. Chaffee	U.S. senator (Class 3) from Colorado; 1879–1885; Served alongside: Henry M. Teller, George M. Chilcott, Horace A. W. Tabor, Thomas M. Bowen	Succeeded by Henry M. Teller
