= Imogene Pass =

Mountain pass in Colorado, USA

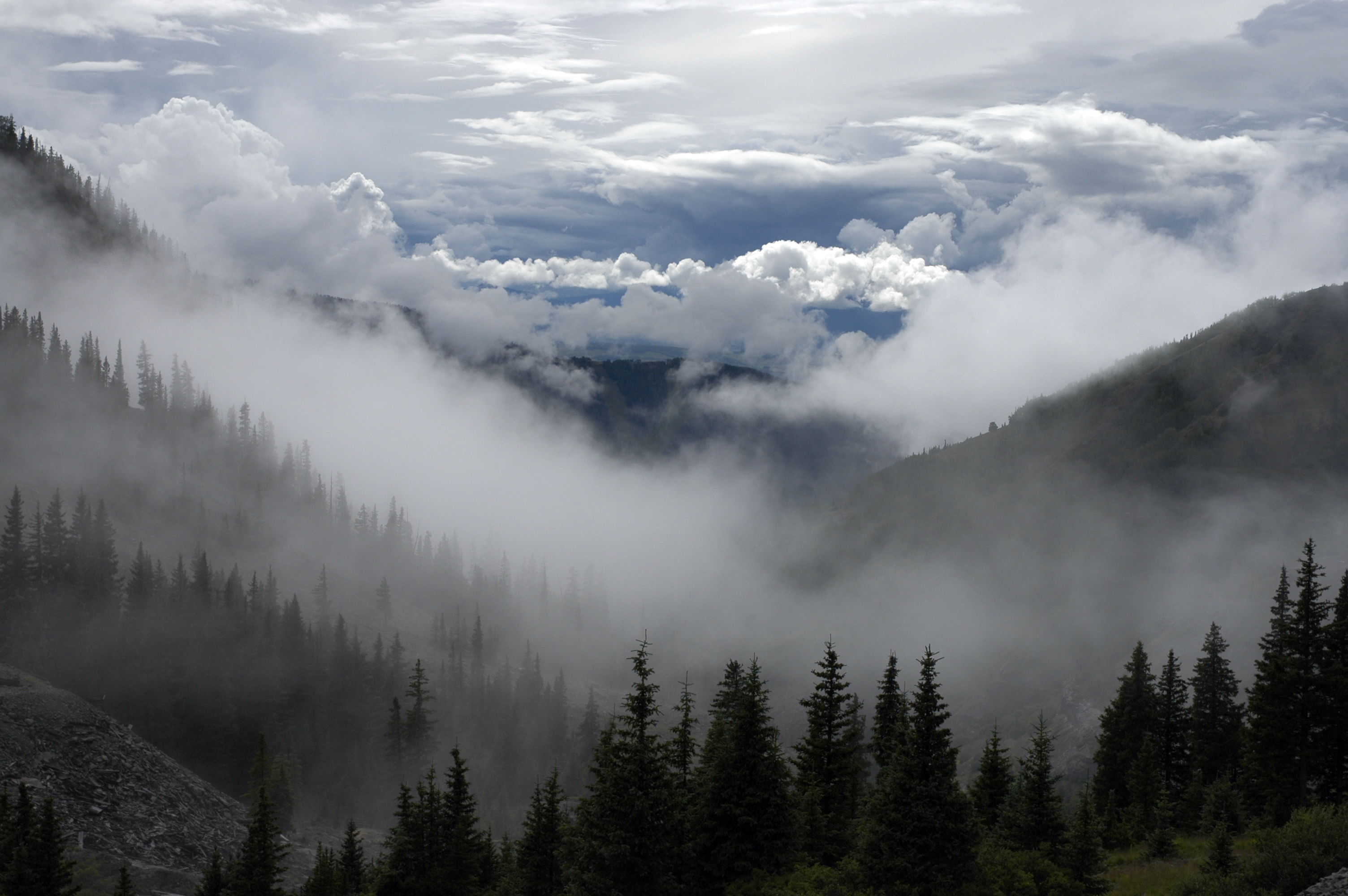
- Interactive map of Imogene Pass
- Elevation: 13,114 ft (3,997 m)
- Traversed by: Unpaved road

Location
- Location: Ouray / San Miguel counties, Colorado, U.S.
- Range: San Juan Mountains
- Coordinates: 37°55′56″N 107°44′10″W
- Topo map: USGS Ironton

Imogene Pass is a 13,114 ft (3,997 m) high mountain pass in the San Juan Mountains in the southwest part of the US state of Colorado.

It crosses a ridge connecting Ouray, Colorado with Telluride, Colorado, and is the highest mountain pass in the San Juan Mountains, and the second highest vehicular mountain crossing in Colorado. The road is accessible by four wheel drive vehicles, and is not for the novice driver.

From Ouray, the road turns off the road to Yankee Boy Basin above the Camp Bird Mine near the ghost town of Sneffels southwest of Ouray, and climbs through Imogene Basin to the summit.

From Telluride, the road takes off north of downtown and climbs past the ghost town of Tomboy through Savage Basin to the summit.

The first long distance alternating current power line was constructed over Imogene Pass to carry power from the Telluride area to the Camp Bird Mine.

"Fort Peabody" was constructed in 1904 by a local unit of the Colorado National Guard on top of the pass to prevent union miners from crossing during a labor strike.

An annual foot race is held over the pass between Ouray and Telluride on the first Saturday following Labor Day. The grueling 17 mi (27 km) race starts at around 7,800 ft (2,400 m) before cresting the pass at its peak, an elevation gain of just over a mile.
