= Strutwear Knitting Company Building =

- U.S. National Register of Historic Places
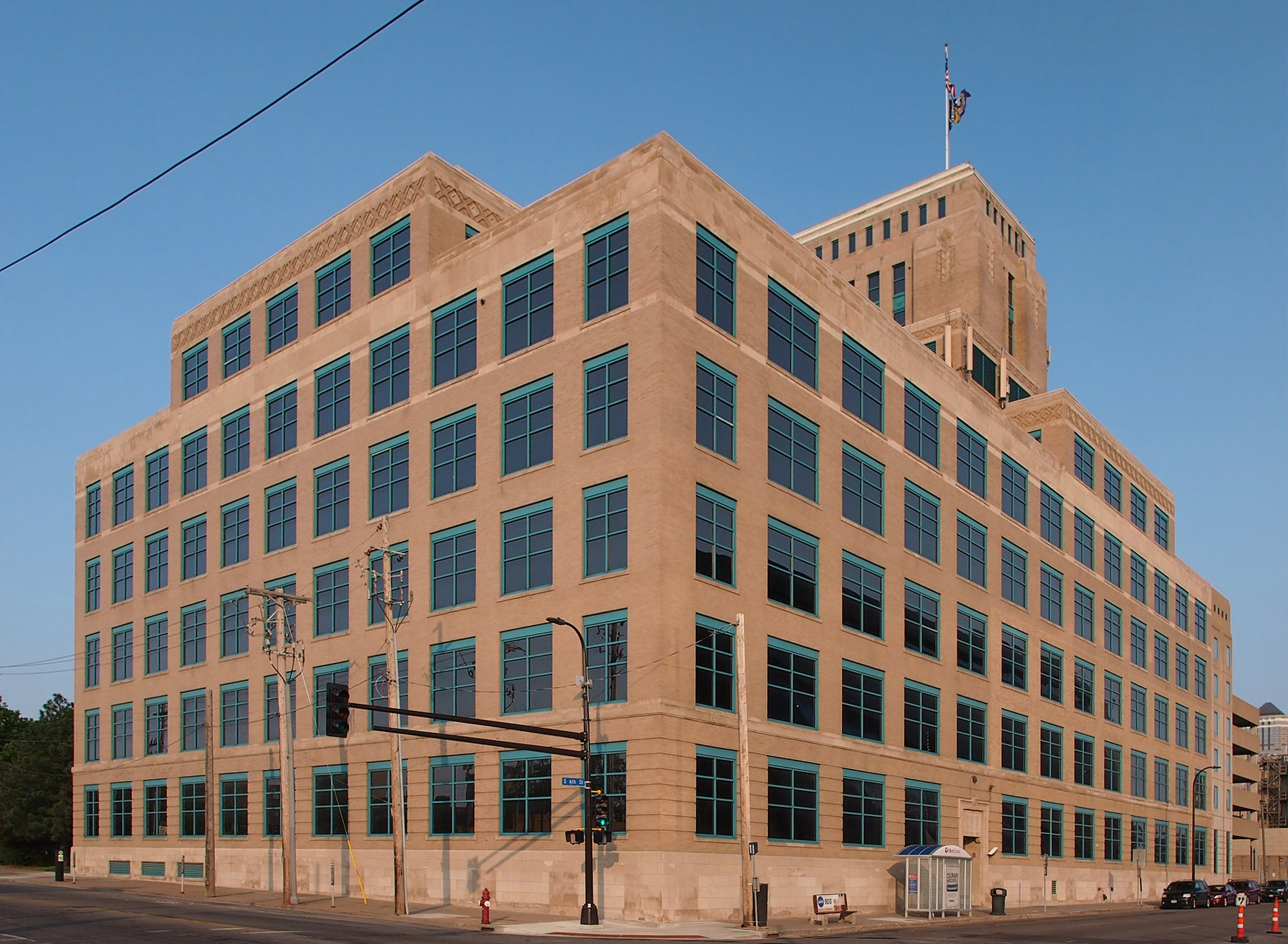
- Strutwear building from the east in 2016

- Location within Minnesota Location within the United States
- Location: 1010 S. 7th St., Minneapolis, Hennepin County, Minnesota
- Coordinates: 44°58′17″N 93°15′26″W
- Built: 1922–1930
- Architects: Long and Thorshov (architects), James Leck Co. (contractor)
- Architectural style: Modern movement, Art Deco
- NRHP reference No.: 150007919
- Added to NRHP: November 17, 2015

The Strutwear Knitting Company Building was built in downtown Minneapolis, Minnesota, in phases beginning in 1922. A hosiery factory occupied the building until 1958. The Strutwear Strike of 1935 vs. Citizens' Alliance was an 8-month-long milestone in the labor movement, following on the successful Minneapolis general strike of 1934.

In 1960, Seymour Cray moved his engineering design team from Control Data headquarters at 501 Park Ave. to the nearby Strutwear building to avoid management interference. There they designed the CDC 6600 that would be termed the first supercomputer. Cray moved again in 1962 to Chippewa Falls, Wisconsin, where the computer was completed.

In 2023, the building reopened as 171 apartments with space for retail.
