= Crawford Hill (businessman) =

Colorado businessman (1862–1922)

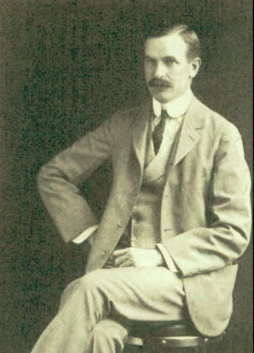
Crawford Hill

Crawford Hill (March 29, 1862–December 22, 1922) was a businessman from Denver, Colorado, the president of a number of companies. He was commissioned a colonel and on the military staffs of governors Albert McIntire and John Long Routt (second term). Hill was director at the Colorado Museum of Natural History and the Young Women's Christian Association.

== Early years ==
Crawford Hill was born on March 29, 1862, in Providence, Rhode Island, to Alice (Hale) Hill and Nathaniel P. Hill while a professor at Brown University. His family moved to Colorado in 1867 and he attended grammar school in Black Hawk. He attended the English and Classical School in Providence to prepare for college. He graduated from Brown University in 1885.

== Career ==
In August 1885, he joined his father's newspaper, the Denver Republican and remained there until about 1889. He inherited the paper when his father died and it became an influential paper throughout Colorado and the Mid-West. It also made him a fortune. He was second vice president of Associated Press and president of The Republican Publishing Company.

Hill was the president of Denargo Land Company and The Hill Land & Investment Company. He was the president of the board of trustees of the Boston & Colorado Smelting Company. Hill had executive positions at other organizations. He was commissioned a colonel and on the military staffs of Governors Albert McIntire and John Long Routt (second term).

Hill was director at the Colorado Museum of Natural History and the Young Women's Christian Association.

== Personal life ==
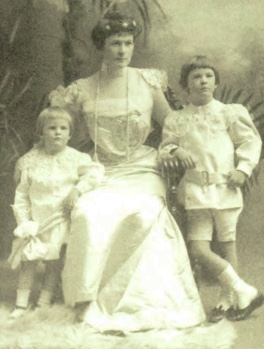
Louise Sneed Hill with sons, Crawford Jr. and Nathaniel in 1905. Western History Department, Denver Public Library

On January 15, 1895, he married Louise Bethell Sneed in Memphis, Tennessee. They had two sons, Nathaniel Peter Hill and Crawford Hill. The Hills were Denver socialites. He was a member of a number of clubs and organizations in Denver and the Union Club of the City of New York. The Hills built Crawford Hill Mansion at Tenth and Sherman Streets in 1905. Hill died on December 22, 1922.
