= Louise Sneed Hill =

Socialite in Denver, Colorado (1862–1955)

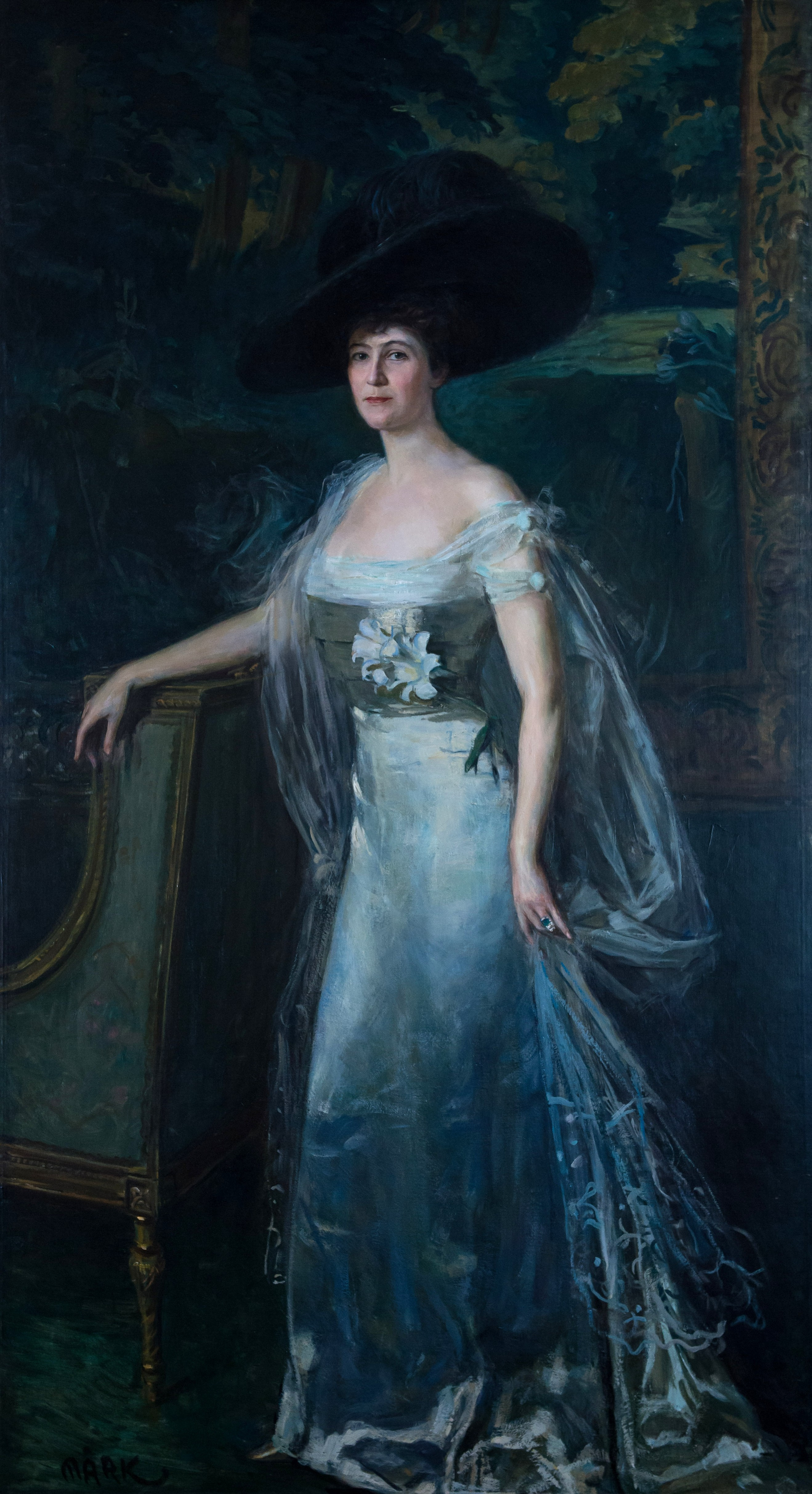
Louise Sneed Hill, wife of Crawford Hill, Representative Women of Colorado, 1910

Louise Sneed Hill (ca. June 30, 1862 – March 28, 1955) (Note: There is confusion about her dates of birth and death from non-reliable / genealogical sources. It appears that there is confusion between her date of birth and her husband's date of birth, but she was born about June 30 - eleven days before the death of her mother on July 11. She was not born in March of 1862. There is also some confusion about the year, she was clearly born in 1862. Her date of death is March 28, 1955, per the cited source and by reading an image of her gravestone. See citations for dates for birth and death.) was an American society leader in Denver, Colorado, in the 19th century. She was the wife of Crawford Hill and daughter-in-law of senator and mining executive Nathaniel P. Hill. She created the first list of socialites in Denver, called the Who's Who in Denver Society, now called the Blue Book. She entertained with lavish parties and card games for an elite group she created called the Sacred 36.

== Early years ==
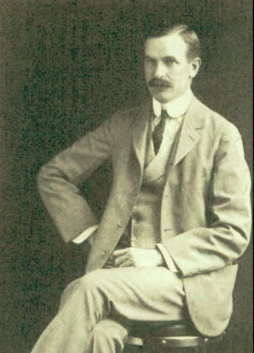
Crawford Hill

Louise Sneed was born in Townsville, North Carolina, at about the start of the American Civil War. Her parents were William Morgan Sneed and Louise (Bethell) Sneed. Her mother died July 11, 1862, 11 days after giving birth to Louise. The Sneeds had a total of six children, two males were serving in the American Civil War at the time of her death. She was educated in New York City at St. Mary's School on 46th Street. It was an Episcopal boarding and day school offering primary, preparatory, and collegiate education for young ladies. It also provided preparation for foreign travel. Her father died December 10, 1891, near Townsville. After both of her parents had died, she went to live with an older sister in Memphis, Tennessee. In 1893, she came to Denver to visit cousins at Bethell mansion on Capitol Hill, where she met Crawford Hill, the son of Senator Nathaniel P. Hill.

== Marriage and children ==
Crawford and Louise were married in Memphis at Calvary Episcopal Church on January 15, 1895. Sensing that her daughter-in-law was making a power play, Alice Hale Hill said that she was "sick over Crawford's marriage".

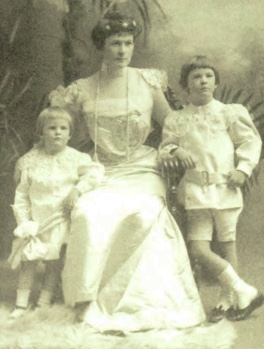
Louise Sneed Hill with sons, Crawford Jr. and Nathaniel in 1905. Western History Department, Denver Public Library

While it was previously believed the Hills moved into an apartment at La Veta Place in downtown Denver, on the present site of the City and County building, this is actually incorrect. The Hills did not live in La Veta Place but instead made their home across the street at 1407 Cleveland Place. Their home at 1407 Cleveland Place was the former home of Thomas H. Lawrence and his family, who lived in the residence from about 1888 until the start of 1895. In March 1895, Nathaniel P. Hill purchased the Lawrence’s home for his son and daughter-in-law. In April 1900, Crawford Hill took possession of the property, a month before his father’s death. The Crawford Hills hired the architecture firm of Boal and Harnois to repair and alter their Cleveland Place home over the years they lived there, but after the birth of their sons, Nathaniel in 1896 and Crawford Jr. in 1898, the Hills decided the home no longer suited their needs. After the Hills moved out of their Cleveland Place home, they rented the property to the Denver Republican Club, the Denver Motor Club, the Democratic Club and the Foo and Wing Herb Co.

== Denver society ==
Hill began her quest to remedy what she saw as a "social wasteland" and to become a member of Denver society, following and surpassing the footsteps of her mother-in-law. The Hills built Crawford Hill Mansion at Tenth and Sherman Streets in 1905. Hill invited those who she considered to be the best of Denver's high society to play whist or bridge at the mansion. The group was made up of an elite group of 36 women for nine tables of four people. This group became known as the Sacred 36. Margaret Brown wanted to be part of the group, but never was invited. She labeled Hill "the snobbiest woman in Denver". Later, when Brown became a national figure as The Unsinkable Molly Brown, following the RMS Titanic disaster, she was then let into the Hill mansion.

Hill entertained wearing haute couture clothing, with prominent figures both in Denver and internationally, and royalty. She employed expensive and well regarded caterers and orchestras to impress her wealth and status upon her guests. Seeking publicity, she courted journalists and sent gifts to those who wrote about her parties.

[H]er wit, charm, and high society leadership commanded attention for fifty years. Louise's stubborn intent to lift a dusty, complacent cowtown to a high level of elegance obviously struck a chord in Coloradoans. During her reign there was glamour and fun, champagne and caviar, gossip and French couture. The champagne was more bubbly then, and the orchestra didn't stop playing at midnight.

— Marilyn Griggs Riley, High Altitude Attitudes: Six Savvy Colorado Women

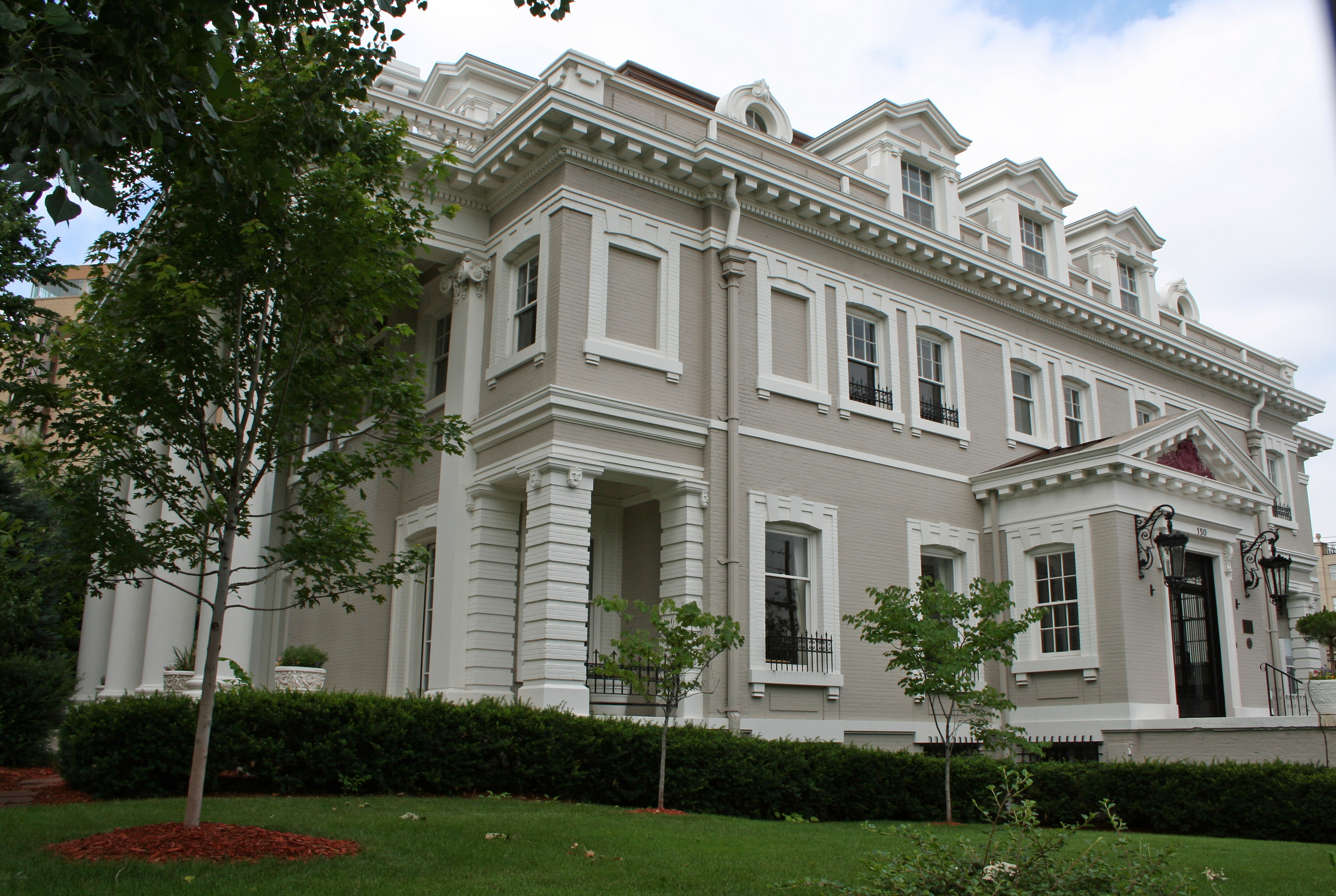
Crawford Hill Mansion, Tenth and Sherman Streets, Denver, Colorado

She created the first published record of members of society in 1908 with the Who's Who in Denver Society. To be included on the list, one must have money and know how to entertain. It has evolved to the Blue Book of wealthy people from Denver. She provided information, such as the proper hours for calling, rules for the calling card, the high tea, the wedding journey, and how to get into society.

Hill traveled to New York City, to Newport, Rhode Island, and to Paris. While in England, she was presented at the court of King Edward VII. During this audience, she wore a satin gown embroidered with diamonds and had a red velvet cape trimmed in 14-karat gold. She became the first person in Denver to entertain a president when William Howard Taft visited. He was met by a red carpet, an orchestra, and Hill's sons wearing white satin suits. She was politically active, involved in Republican Party women's clubs. Her sons married and moved to Newport, where she visited them. She continued to travel to Paris, London, and New York City.

== Bulkeley Wells ==
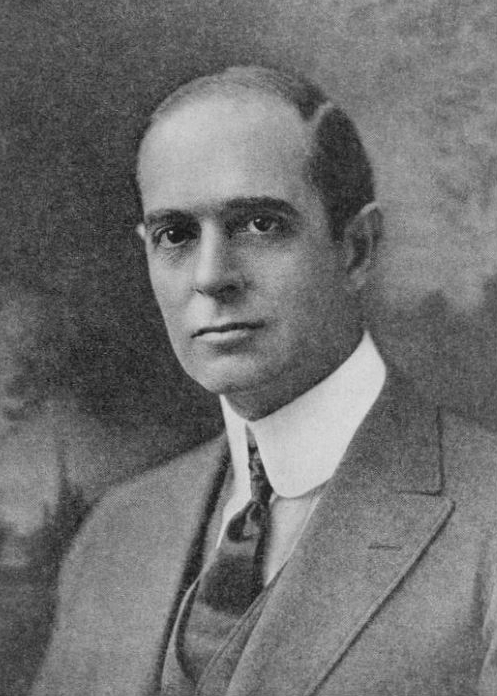
Buckeley Wells. Photo from History of Colorado, edited by Wilbur Fiske Stone (1918).

It is unclear when Louise first met Bulkeley Wells (also seen as "Buckeley"), a polo-playing socialite, but by 1906 they were photographed together and had developed a close relationship. He was a general in the Colorado National Guard and had mining interests in the state. They became involved in a complicated affair. Crawford and Bulkeley also had a close relationship. The three together were a “tight trio.” In his will, Crawford named Bulkeley an alternative executor to his wife and guardian to his children. Louise hung pictures of both men in the foyer of the mansion, Wells having the larger of the two pictures. The younger Wells was married with four children and the Hill children would vacation with the Wells family. His wife, Grace Livermore Wells, divorced him in 1918. After a series of bad financial investments, including losing $15 million of investor Harry Payne Whitney’s funds, Wells continued to decline financially.

Crawford Hill died in 1922, and Hill rather assumed that Wells would stay by her side, but he eloped with a woman from Nevada. He lost his mining empire and gas and oil speculations. He gambled and lost the last of his money. He was on the verge of bankruptcy when he committed suicide in 1931.

== Later years ==
She lived in the mansion until World War II when the upkeep of her home became difficult and she suffered from a stroke. Consequently, she moved into a suite in the Brown Palace Hotel. She led a quiet life until her death on May 28, 1955. She is buried at Fairmount Cemetery next to Crawford in the Hill family plot. After her death, Local historian Caroline Bancroft said "There is no Society in Denver anymore".
