= The Pinkerton Labor Spy =

1907 book by Morris Friedman

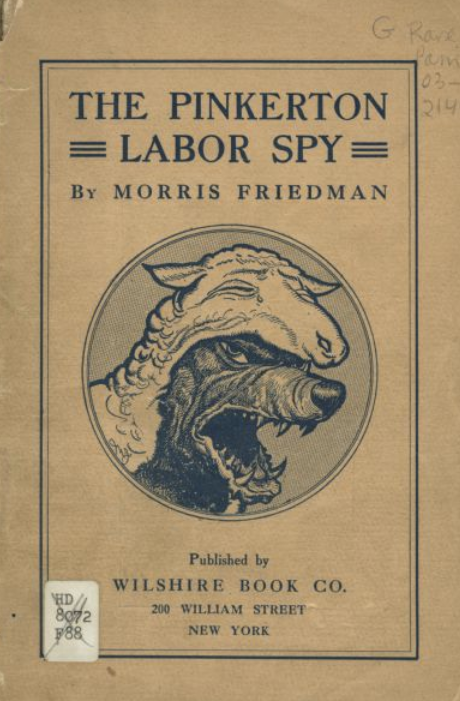
- Author: Morris Friedman
- Language: English
- Genre: Non-fiction
- Publisher: Wilshire Book Company
- Publication date: 1907
- Publication place: United States
- OCLC: 11342350

The Pinkerton Labor Spy (alternately, The Pinkerton's Labor Spy) is a nonfiction book published in 1907 as an exposé of intrigue and abuses by the Pinkerton Detective Agency in general, and by chief agent James McParland in particular.

The book detailed the use of spies by mining and ore milling companies during the period of the Colorado Labor Wars. It described the recruiting, utilization, and management of agents who infiltrated the Western Federation of Miners and the United Mine Workers unions for the purposes of disruption, sabotage, and gathering information.

The author of the book, Morris Friedman, had worked in the agency as Mr. McParland's stenographer.

== Other criticism ==
The Pinkerton Labor Spy criticized the Pinkerton Detective Agency from a pro-labor point of view. Charlie Siringo, another former employee of the agency, had no sympathy for labor, yet wrote books about his experiences as a Pinkerton Detective that were so objectionable to the company, they were repeatedly suppressed. In 1936, the La Follette Committee of the United States Senate investigated and publicized abuses of detective agencies, including Pinkerton. The Pinkerton Agency eventually shifted from detective work to security services, at least in part due to such criticism.

== See also ==
- Anti-union violence
- William J. Barney
- Bill Haywood
- Albert Horsley also known as Harry Orchard
