= Gilpin County School District RE-1 =

School district in Colorado, United States

Address
- 10595 Highway 119 Black Hawk, Colorado, 80422; United States

District information
- Grades: Pre-school - 12
- Superintendent: David MacKenzie Phd.
- NCES District ID: 0804230

Students and staff
- Enrollment: 380
- Student–teacher ratio: 13.76

Other information
- Telephone: (303) 582-3444
- Website: www.gilpin.k12.co.us

Gilpin County School District RE-1 is a public school district in Gilpin County, Colorado, United States.

== Schools ==
Gilpin County School District RE-1 has one elementary school and one high school.

=== Elementary schools ===
- Gilpin County Elementary School

=== High schools ===
- Gilpin County Undivided High School
