= Gilpin County Undivided High School =

Location
- 10595 Highway 119; Black Hawk, Colorado 80422; United States; 39°50′00″N 105°31′12″W

Information
- Type: Public
- School district: Gilpin County School District
- CEEB code: 060104
- Grades: 6–12
- Colors: Black and gold
- Mascot: Eagle
- Website: www.gilpin.k12.co.us/125252_2

Gilpin County Undivided High School is located on Highway 119 in Black Hawk, Colorado, United States. It is a K–12 school and the only public school in Gilpin County School District RE-1.
