= Morris Friedman =

American stenographer

Morris Friedman was, until 1905, the private stenographer for Pinkerton detective James McParland. Friedman came to the attention of the public when he published an exposé of anti-union actions by the private detective industry which was called The Pinkerton Labor Spy. The book focused in particular on how mining and ore milling companies used spies during the Colorado Labor Wars.

Friedman was called as a witness at the trial of the Secretary-Treasurer of the Western Federation of Miners (WFM), Big Bill Haywood. The Idaho Daily Statesman described the Russian-born Friedman as,

... a striking looking young fellow, rather languid ... with a shock of black hair, and his features of the marked Hebrew type. Heavy, thick glasses magnify his naturally large eyes and his smooth shaven face is very pale. He was slow and deliberate in his actions, like the railway conductor who knew the train wouldn't leave without him.

Friedman "described dirty tricks used by the Pinkertons to subvert the WFM, including the use of undercover operatives within the WFM who padded bills to drain the Federation treasury and reduced payments to miners to build dissatisfaction with Haywood."

Friedman described the Pinkertons as a secret police force. Under questioning by Clarence Darrow, defense attorney for Bill Haywood, Friedman identified Pinkerton agents who had infiltrated the Western Federation of Miners: Charlie Siringo, who became recording secretary of the miners' union in Burke, Idaho; A. H. Crane, secretary of the Cripple Creek, Colorado union; C. J. Connibear, president of the Florence, Colorado union; R. P. Bailey, a member of the Victor, Colorado union; and A. W. Gratias, president of the union at Globeville. Pinkerton Agent George W. Riddell, former president of the Eureka miners union in Utah, was forced to resign when Friedman published the book.

Friedman provided the attorneys with a stack of documents which had been signed by McParland, attesting to the authenticity of his observations. Many reporters thought that the witness's testimony indicated "...that many of the infiltrators were actually agents provocateurs who'd committed crimes to bring the unions into disrepute."
