= William J. Barney =

American mine worker

William Julius Barney
- Born: August 14, 1867
- Died: Unknown

William Julius Barney (born August 14, 1867) was an American mine worker. He conducted normal employment, but for one act: he quit a job as a Telluride, Colorado mine guard during a labor dispute without letting anyone know that he was doing so. As a result of subsequent conspiracies and false accusations, William J. Barney's disappearance came to national attention, and played a role not only in local intrigue, but also in maneuvering over the assassination trials of accused conspirators charged with the murder of former Idaho Governor Frank Steunenberg.

== History ==
On May 1, 1901, 350 union miners walked off their jobs at the Smuggler-Union mine in Telluride. Their walkout was a protest of a new method of payment, called "contracting," or "fathoms," which could sometimes result in a miner doing thirty days worth of digging, and getting underpaid for the work. The strike was settled, but in some quarters animosity against union leaders continued.

Bulkeley Wells, a Telluride mining company president and manager who, according to writer MaryJoy Martin, was "born to privilege... [and was] convinced laborers were beneath him," was intent upon hanging Vincent St. John, the head of the local miners union. According to Martin, Wells colluded with others, including Pinkerton Agent James McParland, and the Colorado Mine Owners' Association, to accuse St. John of conducting a "reign of terror" — and in particular, of murdering William J. Barney, a mine guard who had disappeared from his post. McParland, who decades earlier had been the special agent assigned to infiltrate the Molly Maguires in Pennsylvania, contributed his belief that an "Inner Circle" within the Western Federation of Miners was responsible for widespread assassinations. Former McParland stenographer Morris Friedman wrote that McParland gained considerable income from Colorado's mining interests for the Pinkerton National Detective Agency by making such unproved accusations. At the time of his disappearance, the Telluride authorities didn't know any details of Will Barney's age, marital status, family, or where he came from. But they found some remains, and they drew conclusions. Wells placed a skull in a shop window, adorned with a sign decrying the "Grewsome Work" of the Telluride Miners' Union. There was one complicating factor: William Julius Barney wasn't dead.
