= Black Hawk, Colorado =

Home-rule city in Gilpin County, Colorado, USA

- Home rule city
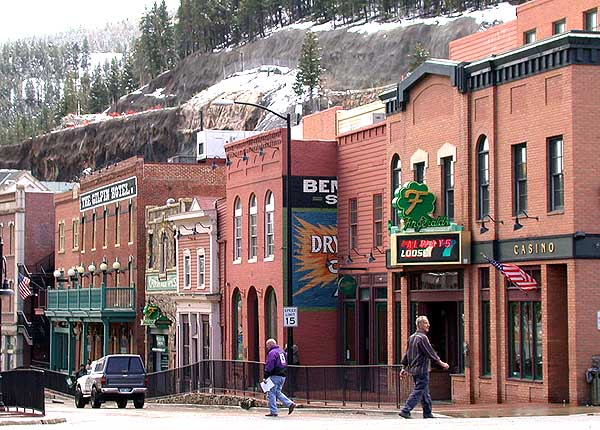
- Restored historic buildings in downtown Black Hawk.
- Nickname: "The City of Mills"
- Motto: "Preserving the Past, Preparing for the Future, Still Making History"
- Location within Gilpin County, Colorado
- Coordinates: 39°48′22″N 105°30′08″W
- Country: United States
- State: Colorado
- County: Gilpin
- Founded: 1859
- Incorporated: June 12, 1886

Government
  - Type: Home rule city

Area
  - Total: 2.653 sq mi (6.871 km^{2})
  - Land: 2.653 sq mi (6.871 km^{2})
  - Water: 0 sq mi (0.000 km^{2})
- Elevation: 8,058 ft (2,456 m)

Population (2020)
  - Total: 127
  - Density: 48/sq mi (19/km^{2})
- Time zone: UTC−07:00 (MST)
  - Summer (DST): UTC−06:00 (MDT)
- ZIP code: 80403, 80422 (PO Box)
- Area codes: 303/720/983
- GNIS town ID: 2409856
- FIPS code: 08-07025
- Website: City of Black Hawk

Black Hawk is a home rule city located in Gilpin County, Colorado, United States. The population was 127 at the 2020 United States census, making it the least populous city (but not town) in Colorado. It was a mining settlement founded in 1859 during the Pike's Peak Gold Rush and is now a part of the Denver-Aurora-Lakewood, CO Metropolitan Statistical Area and the Front Range Urban Corridor.

Black Hawk is located adjacent to Central City, another historic mining settlement in Gregory Gulch. The two cities form the federally designated Central City/Black Hawk National Historic District. The area flourished during the mining boom of the late 19th century following the construction of mills and a railroad link to Golden.

The town declined during the 20th century but has been revived in recent years after the 1991 establishment of casino gambling following a statewide initiative in 1990. In early 2010, the Black Hawk city council passed a law banning the riding of bicycles in the town, drawing a reaction from bicycle advocacy groups and international press. The ban was overturned by the Colorado Supreme Court in 2013.

== History ==
Black Hawk was established in 1859 as the mining camp of Black Hawk Point in the Territory of Kansas. Black Hawk was incorporated on March 11, 1864, by an act of the Colorado Territorial Legislature (House Bill 22), and is recognized as the second incorporated city in Colorado Territory, following Denver.

=== Mining boom ===
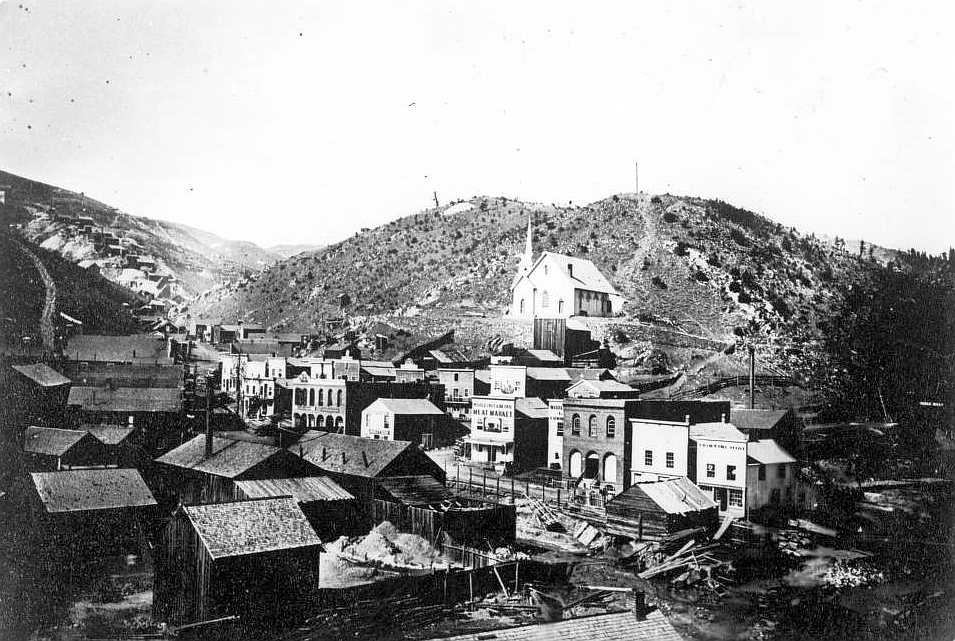
Black Hawk, 1864

In May 1859 the discovery of gold in Gregory Gulch by its namesake, John H. Gregory, brought thousands of prospectors and miners into the area, combing the hills for more gold veins. The Bobtail lode was discovered the following month. The free Territory of Colorado was organized on February 28, 1861. The Black Hawk Point, Colorado Territory, post office opened on December 6, 1862. Hardrock mining boomed for a few years, but then declined in the mid-1860s as the miners exhausted the shallow parts of the veins that contained free gold and found that their amalgamation mills could not recover gold from the deeper sulfide ores.

Nathaniel P. Hill built Colorado's first successful ore smelter in Black Hawk in 1868. Hill's smelter could recover gold from the sulfide ores, an achievement that saved hardrock mining in Black Hawk, Central City, and Idaho Springs from ruin. Other smelters were built nearby. Black Hawk's advantageous location on North Clear Creek made it the center of ore processing for the area, and it became known as the "City of Mills". The name of the Black Hawk Point post office was shortened to Black Hawk on February 8, 1871.

The Colorado Central Railroad extended its line to the town in 1872. Colorado became a state on August 1, 1876, and the City of Black Hawk was incorporated on June 12, 1886. The spelling of the Black Hawk post office was changed to Blackhawk on January 30, 1895, but was then changed back to Black Hawk on July 1, 1950. Black Hawk is currently the least populous city in the State of Colorado.

A restored narrow-gauge railroad depot and locomotive are on display on the east side of downtown. Black Hawk was also served by the two-foot-gauge Gilpin Tramway which climbed from Black Hawk to the mines above Central City.

=== Gambling boom ===
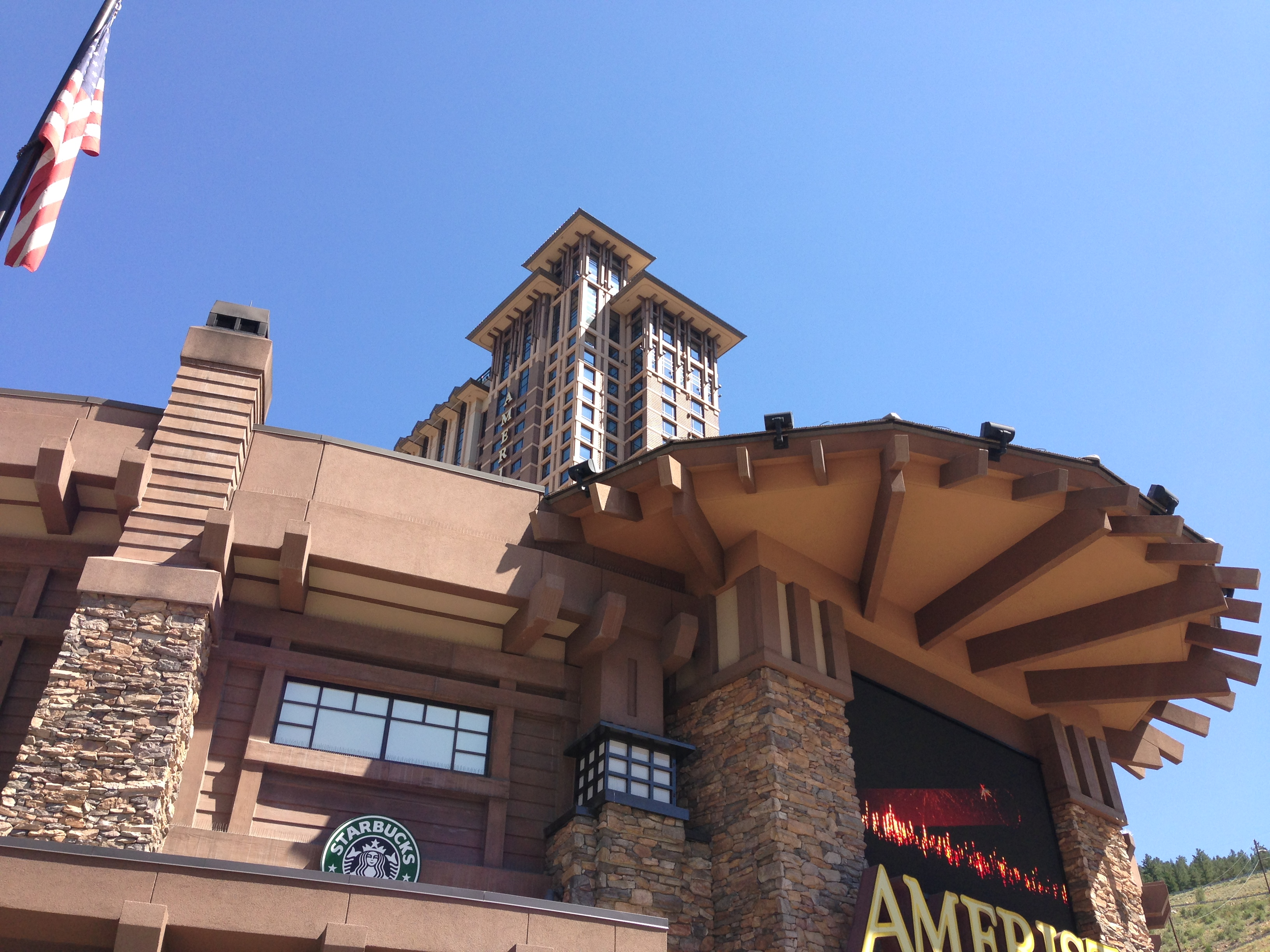
Ameristar Casino

Many historic buildings in the town have been restored following the opening of the casinos in 1991. The town has been in heated competition for gambling revenue with its neighbor Central City since casinos opened in both towns in 1991. Development of the area down Clear Creek from the historic Black Hawk townsite lining State Highway 119 has flourished. Gamblers from Denver pass the Black Hawk casinos before they arrive at Central City, and, as a result, Black Hawk has realized much more revenue from gambling than Central City. Gambling in Black Hawk also benefits from less restrictive zoning codes; while Central City until recently limited building heights to 53 feet (16 m) to preserve the historic character of the town, Black Hawk has no such limits. In an attempt to close the competitive gap, Central City built the Central City Parkway from Interstate 70 near Idaho Springs as an alternative route, leading guests first to Central City, and then to Black Hawk. The Central City Parkway opened November 19, 2004. However, Black Hawk continues to have three times the number of casinos and generates more than seven times the gambling revenue that Central City does.

Although the 1990 statewide referendum allowing casino gambling in Black Hawk was promoted as a way to promote historic preservation in Black Hawk, critics have charged that it has had the opposite effect, and that the historic appearance of Black Hawk has been sacrificed to allow construction of the large casinos.

Tax from the gambling revenue provides funding for the State Historical Fund, administered by the Colorado Office of Archaeology and Historic Preservation.

=== Bicycling ban controversy ===
In February 2013, the Colorado Supreme Court overturned a citywide ban on bicycle traffic through Black Hawk, ruling that the city had failed to comply with state traffic law. In 2010, the Black Hawk banned bicycle use on most of the streets in the city. The ban was prompted by a surge in traffic following the change in maximum casino betting limits from $5 to $100. Black Hawk City Manager Michael Copp said that the city council, which passed the new law, believed it was best for the casinos and their patrons. The penalty for riding a bicycle through Black Hawk was a $68 fine. Bicycle advocacy groups challenged the bike ban, with the case ultimately going to the Colorado Supreme Court. State Highway 119 and County Road 279 in Black Hawk are part of the Great Parks Bicycle Route and the Peak to Peak Scenic Byway touring route.

== Geography ==
The town is located along the north fork of Clear Creek and Gregory Gulch.

At the 2020 United States census, the city had a total area of 1,698 acres (6.871 km^{2}), all of it land.

== Demographics ==
Historical population
Census	Pop.	Note	%±
1870	1,068		—
1880	1,540		44.2%
1890	1,067		−30.7%
1900	1,200		12.5%
1910	668		−44.3%
1920	253		−62.1%
1930	253		0.0%
1940	289		14.2%
1950	166		−42.6%
1960	171		3.0%
1970	217		26.9%
1980	232		6.9%
1990	227		−2.2%
2000	118		−48.0%
2010	118		0.0%
2020	127		7.6%
U.S. Decennial Census

As of the census of 2000, there were 118 people, 54 households, and 28 families residing in the city. The population density was 80.9 inhabitants per square mile (31.2/km^{2}). There were 79 housing units at an average density of 54.2 per square mile (20.9/km^{2}). The racial makeup of the city was 84.75% White, 3.39% African American, 0.85% Native American, 5.93% from other races, and 5.08% from two or more races. Hispanic or Latino of any race were 10.17% of the population.

There were 54 households, out of which 18.5% had children under the age of 18 living with them, 40.7% were married couples living together, 5.6% had a female householder with no husband present, and 46.3% were non-families. 33.3% of all households were made up of individuals, and 9.3% had someone living alone who was 65 years of age or older. The average household size was 2.19 and the average family size was 2.69.

In the city, the population was spread out, with 17.8% under the age of 18, 5.9% from 18 to 24, 33.1% from 25 to 44, 34.7% from 45 to 64, and 8.5% who were 65 years of age or older. The median age was 41 years. For every 100 females, there were 131.4 males. For every 100 females aged 18 and over, there were 131.0 males.

The median income for a household in the city was $44,583, and the median income for a family was $52,500. Males had a median income of $29,688 versus $20,833 for females. The per capita income for the city was $25,985. None of the population and none of the families were below the poverty line.

== Education ==
Black Hawk Public Schools are part of the Gilpin County School District RE-1. The district has one elementary school and one high school, Gilpin County Elementary School and Gilpin County Undivided High School.

Dave MacKenzie is the Superintendent of Schools.

There are approximately 380 students enrolled in the district.

== Infrastructure ==
=== Transportation ===
The Black Hawk & Central City Tramway, operated by the cities of Black Hawk and Central City, provides a free shuttle between the two towns. Ramblin Express and Ace Express Coaches provides transportation from Denver.

== Notable people ==
- William A. Conant (1816–1909), merchant, politician, and railroad agent
- Nathaniel P. Hill, Brown University chemistry professor, Black Hawk smelter magnate, U.S. senator
- Jesse Shwayder, American businessman, founder, president and chairman of the Samsonite Corporation

== See also ==
- Central City/Black Hawk Historic District
- Front Range Urban Corridor
