= Ed Boyce =

Union organizer and mining executive

Edward "Ed" Boyce
- Ed Boyce as he appeared in 1903
- Born: November 8, 1862; County Donegal, Ireland
- Died: December 24, 1941 (aged 79); Portland, Oregon, U.S.
- Occupations: Labor leader, hotelier, mine owner
- Spouse: Eleanor Day Boyce (1901-1941; his death)

Edward Boyce (November 8, 1862 – December 24, 1941) was president of the Western Federation of Miners, a radical American labor organizer, socialist and hard rock mine owner.

== Early life ==
Edward Boyce was born in County Donegal, Ireland in 1862 and was the youngest of four children. His father died at an early age. Boyce was educated in local schools. He emigrated to Boston, Massachusetts at age 19.

Boyce took his first job as a construction worker for the Milwaukee Northern Railroad, an interurban line between Milwaukee and Sheboygan, earning $1.25 a day at the job. He managed to save $100 by 1883 and then moved west to Leadville, Colorado, where he arrived in 1883. Boyce sent the next four years working in the mines. He joined the Leadville Miners' Union, an affiliate of the Knights of Labor in 1884.

Boyce left Leadville for Idaho, where he worked at various mines in Coeur d'Alene and also in Butte, Montana before moving to Wardner, Idaho. He joined the Wardner Miners' Union in 1888, and was later elected its corresponding secretary.

== Coeur d'Alene strike ==
In 1892, the 30-year-old Boyce became an active leader in a strike near Coeur d'Alene, Idaho. In January 1892, railroad companies serving the area increased the shipping rate of ore. The mine owners decided to close the mines for four months until a compromise with the railroads could be reached. This action threw 1,600 miners out of work.

The mines reopened two months early, but wages had been slashed by 15 percent. The miners struck. The owners offered to restore wages to their previous levels but refused to recognize the union, an offer Boyce and the other union leaders rejected. When three scab workers were forced to join the union by a mob of miners (a fourth fled the county), the Coeur d'Alene Mine Owners' Association obtained an injunction from the United States district court at Boise, Idaho, preventing anyone from interfering with the working of the mines. The mine owners began importing scabs at the rate of 16 workers a day from outside the region. Company militia provided protection. (Idaho's state constitution contained a prohibition against the creation or use of private militia, but the law was not enforced.)

Random incidents of violence heightened the tension: A guard exchanged words with a miner and was whipped. Two drunk guards picked a fight with a group of miners in a local bar. Three guards armed with rifles threatened a miners' camp. Late in the evening of Sunday, July 10, the miners discovered that their union secretary, Charles Siringo, was a mine owner spy hired from the Pinkerton Agency. During that evening and into the early morning hours of July 11, armed miners surrounded the shuttered Frisco mill of the Gem mine. A firefight broke out. During the gun battle, miners dropped a barrel of gunpowder down the flume of the mill; the powderkeg exploded, destroying the mill and killing a non-union miner.

The mine owners demanded that Governor N. B. Willey, a former mine manager, proclaim martial law. Although violence in the region had ended, Willey called out the National Guard. President Benjamin Harrison ordered federal troops to back up the Idaho state troops. Martial law lasted four months. Nearly 600 miners were arrested and confined in a large outdoor prison, or bullpen. But since most of the local inhabitants were miners or sympathized with them, the state had little chance of obtaining convictions.

Several union leaders, however, were arrested for violating the district court's injunction—Ed Boyce among them. Boyce and the other union officials were confined in the Ada County Jail.

== Formation of the WFM ==
The Coeur d'Alene miners had received financial assistance from miners' unions in Butte, who had paid legal fees for their attorney, James H. Hawley. While the union leaders were still in jail, Hawley suggested that mine unions in the West needed to form a united front, and the union leaders agreed. The Western Federation of Miners (WFM) was formed in 1893 in Butte.

Boyce served a six-month jail term for contempt of court for his role in the 1892 Coeur d'Alene miners' strike, and was blacklisted by the mine owners. After his release in 1893, Boyce prospected for a time in Montana's Bitterroot Mountains before returning to Coeur d'Alene. He obtained work in the mines and was elected president of the Coeur d'Alene Executive Miners' Union, a post he held until 1895.

Although not present for its founding, Boyce attended the WFM's second convention in 1894 and was elected to its executive board. With its headquarters in Coeur d'Alene, nearly all the mines in the Idaho panhandle except for the Bunker Hill and Sullivan Mine recognized the union. Still, the WFM barely survived the next three years.

== Public service ==
In 1894, Boyce was elected to the Idaho state senate as a Populist from Shoshone County, Idaho. Boyce battled for the eight-hour day for miners, the establishment of an arbitration board to settle labor disputes, and an investigation of the 1892 mining war. He objected to appropriations for the state militia, charging that it was a tool used by the state and mine owners to suppress labor. He called for legislation to forbid employment of aliens, to outlaw yellow-dog contracts and prohibit company stores. In one of the most dramatic speeches he ever made, Boyce denounced the blacklist:

Senate bill fifty six provides for no class, no special legislation, but under its provisions those relentless persecutors, known as corporations, are prevented when they discharge an employee from following him with a blacklist and depriving him of the means of earning an honest living in another part of the state….Why do you not produce some argument against it to show that it should not become a law? No, it is not necessary: you of the Republican party have the votes to kill the bill and that is all you desire. But remember these words: the laboring men of Idaho have asked you for bread and you give them a stone: we ask you for justice and you treat us with scorn, but the day is fast approaching when your action will be condemned by every man who has one drop of manly blood in his veins.

The Populists were unable to pass the legislation they desired, and Boyce—disillusioned with the political process—quit after one term.

== WFM presidency ==
While serving in the Idaho legislature, Boyce resigned as president of the Coeur d'Alene Executive Miner's Union in 1895, and took a job as a general organizer for the WFM. In 1896, Boyce was elected president of the Western Federation of Miners. He served until 1902. James Maher was elected WFM secretary-treasurer the same year. Boyce and Maher worked well together. They pumped life into the faltering federation, and the WFM began a period of rapid growth.

William "Big Bill" Haywood heard Boyce make a speech in that first year as president of the WFM, and Haywood decided to become a union member. Haywood later became WFM secretary-treasurer, and a major figure in the American labor movement. In late 1899, Boyce established the WFM's journal, the Miner's Magazine. The first issue came out in early 1900.

=== Leadville, Colorado miners' strike ===
The Cloud City Miners' Union (CCMU), Local 33 of the WFM went on strike in 1896 over a reduction in wages that had persisted since the depression of 1893. The Coronado Mine was re-opened with armed replacement workers during the strike, and an incident on September 21 resulted in shooting and dynamite explosions. After surface buildings were burned, the Colorado governor sent the Colorado National Guard to Leadville. Boyce was one of twenty-seven union men who were jailed, but all of the union's leaders were released for lack of evidence.

=== Radical positions ===
At the 1897 WFM convention in Salt Lake City, Utah, Boyce told his fellow union members to arm themselves:

I deem it important to direct your attention to Article 2 of the Constitutional Amendments of the United States—'the right of the people to keep and bear arms shall not be infringed.' This you should comply with immediately. Every (local) union should have a rifle club. I strongly advise you to provide every member with the latest improved rifle, which can be obtained from the factory at a nominal price. I entreat you to take action on this important question, so that in two years we can hear the inspiring music of the martial tread of 25,000 armed men in the ranks of labor.

=== AFL and WLU ===
Boyce led the WFM to join the American Federation of Labor the year he became WFM president. The affiliation lasted only until the spring of 1898. Samuel Gompers had refused to give striking Colorado miners strike benefits, and Boyce heatedly debated the issue with Gompers. But, convinced that the conservative and craft unionism policies of the AFL were inadequate to the task of organizing workers, Boyce led the WFM out of the AFL.

In 1898, Boyce, a strong believer in industrial unionism, led the WFM to found the Western Labor Union. The Western Labor Union (later the American Labor Union) was established in direct opposition to the craft-oriented AFL, and included workers from all industries.

=== Bunker Hill mine bombing ===
In April 1899, WFM officials demanded that the Bunker Hill and Sullivan Mine recognize the union. The mine owners' response was to fire all union members. Militant union members then blew up the Bunker Hill and Sullivan ore concentrator in the town of Wardner, at the time the largest ore concentrator in the world. Governor Frank Steunenberg declared martial law and President William McKinley ordered U.S. troops from Montana into the area. The miners were rounded up and once again herded into a bullpen. Some of the miners were released after denying that they belonged to any subversive organization.

Boyce was charged with conspiring to blow up the concentrator. Boyce had been in Wardner conferring with local union officers only a week before the explosion. In 1906, former union member and Boyce business associate Harry Orchard told a court that he knew Boyce had planned and approved the bombing of the Bunker Hill and Sullivan Mine. Governor Steunenberg told a United States House of Representatives Committee on Military Affairs that he was convinced Boyce had "inaugurated or perfected this conspiracy by, choosing 20 men from different organizations in that county and swearing them. These 20 men chose one each and swore him, and the 40 each chose a man and swore him, and the 80 each chose a man and swore him. In that way there were at least 160 men in this conspiracy to do this thing, sworn to secrecy."

Boyce denied the charges, and no indictment was ever issued. But the influence of the Western Federation of Miners in Idaho had nearly been destroyed, and its leaders dispersed. New headquarters were established in Denver, Colorado, where Idaho officials could not so easily extradite and try WFM officials. Beginning in 1900, Boyce also edited the WFM journal, Miners Magazine. He left the position when he retired as union president in 1902.

=== Adopting socialism ===
In 1901, Boyce successfully led a campaign to have the WFM adopt socialism as its official economic policy. An ardent socialist, Boyce famously declared:

There can be no harmony between organized capitalists and organized labor. Our present wage system is slavery in its worst form. … Advise strikes as the weapon to be used by labor to obtain its rights, and you will be branded as criminals who aim to ruin the business interests of the country. Change from the policy of simple trades unionism that is fast waning, and you will be told that your action is premature, as this is not the time. Pursue the methods adopted by capitalists and you will be sent to prison for robbery or executed for murder. Demand, and your demands will be construed into threats of violence against the rights of private property calculated to scare capital. Avail yourself of your constitutional rights and propose to take political action, and you will be charged with selling out the organization to some political party. Counsel arbitration, and you will be told that there is nothing to arbitrate. Be conservative, and your tameness will be construed as an appreciation of the conditions thrust upon you by trusts and syndicates. Take what action you will in the interests of labor, the trained beagles in the employ of capital from behind their loathsome fortress of disguised patriotism will howl their tirade of condemnation.

Boyce became an associate of Eugene V. Debs, and endorsed the Socialist Party platform. Boyce also urged the WFM to slowly buy up mines and mining company stock, to replace the wage system with union-owned mines.

== Marriage and retirement ==
On May 14, 1901 in Butte, Montana, Boyce married Eleanor Day, the sister of Harry L. Day, a former bookkeeper who had become a wealthy mine owner. Day and Fred Harper, a local prospector, had discovered the Hercules mine, one of the richest silver and lead mines in the Coeur d'Alene region. The newlyweds honeymooned at the Boyce family home in Ireland.

Boyce declined renomination as WFM president in 1902. He had become disillusioned with mismanagement in some WFM locals. But strong opposition to his continuing presidency had emerged in the powerful Butte Miners' Union, Local 1 of the WFM. In his farewell address, Boyce still remained the firebrand: "There are only two classes of people in the world. One is composed of the men and women who produce all; the other is composed of men and women who produce nothing, but live in luxury upon the wealth produced by others." Socialism, he still argued, was the only way "to abolish the wage system which is more destructive of human rights and liberty than any other slave system devised."

== Later life ==
After his retirement from the WFM, Ed Boyce attended several more WFM conventions. He supported the WFM's creation of the Industrial Workers of the World in 1905, and testified on behalf of Haywood, Moyer and others at their 1907 murder trial. But Boyce gradually separated himself from organized labor, and eventually declined to discuss his part in the miners' union.

The Boyces moved to Wallace, Idaho and then in 1909 to Portland, Oregon. Boyce became an avid reader of social theory and Irish poetry. The Boyces lived quietly, often passing the whole day sitting in the same room reading. Eleanor Boyce took an interest in art and became a member of the Portland Art Association. The Boyces donated freely to a number of local charities.

Boyce invested in the luxurious Portland Hotel Company in 1911, as well as in other real estate ventures in the city. He was the Portland Hotel's vice-president from 1920-29 and its president from 1930 until his death in 1941. In 1936, Boyce was elected president of the Oregon Hotel Association. On December 31, 1923, the Hercules mine partnership was dissolved and the Hercules Mining Company (now Day Mines, Inc.) incorporated in Delaware. Eleanor Day Boyce was the largest stockholder.

== Death and legacy ==
Boyce died on December 24, 1941. He left an estate valued at slightly over $1 million. Eugene V. Debs wrote that Boyce had been "virtually forgotten by the officials of the organization he served at a time when it required real men to speak out for labor." Eleanor Day Boyce returned to Wallace after her husband's death, where she died on January 9, 1951.

== Footnotes ==
Preceded by Not known	President, Western Federation of Miners; 1896 - 1902	Succeeded by Charles Moyer
