= Hercules Mine =

Hercules Mine may refer to

- Hercules Mine, Idaho, USA
- Hercules Mine, Maine, USA
- Hercules Mine, Tasmania.
