= Cloud City =

Cloud City may refer to:

- Floating city (science fiction)
- Cloud City, a floating city on the planet Bespin in the Star Wars universe
- Cloud City, a nickname for Allianz Field, a soccer stadium in Saint Paul, Minnesota, inspired by its broadly similar appearance to the Star Wars location and as a reference to the team's long-standing supporter's group, the Dark Clouds
- Cloud City, a dream location in an episode of the animated miniseries Over the Garden Wall
- The Cloud City Miners' Union, the group which initiated the Leadville Miners' strike in the 1890s
