= May Arkwright Hutton =

American activist (1860–1915)

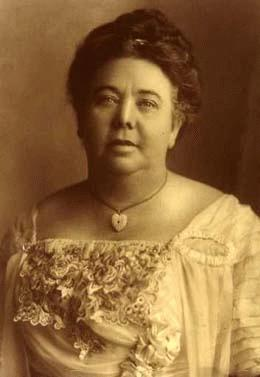
- Born: May Arkwright; July 21, 1860
- Died: October 6, 1915 (aged 55); Spokane, Washington
- Occupations: Suffragist, Labor activist

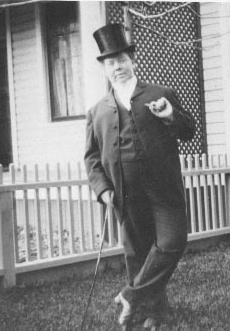
May Arkwright Hutton

May Arkwright Hutton (July 21, 1860 – October 6, 1915) was a suffrage leader and labor rights advocate in the early history of the Pacific Northwest of the United States. She played a large role in Washington's women's suffrage movement.

== Early life ==
May Arkwright Hutton, who has been described as an orphan by some sources, is now often believed to have been illegitimate. She was raised by her paternal grandfather, Aza, in Washingtonville, Ohio. Aza, who was blind, enjoyed political meetings and May often accompanied him.

== Mining ==
In 1883, she moved to Idaho, where she owned and operated a boarding house in Kellogg. In 1887, she married Levi "Al" Hutton, one of her customers. They moved to Wallace, Idaho where she oversaw the dining hall of the Wallace Hotel and her husband worked for the Northern Pacific Railroad. May and Al were part of a group of miners that struck it rich when discovering a vast silver mine. When miners dynamited the Bunker Hill and Sullivan's mine concentrator in Wardner, Idaho, Al was the engineer of the train used to deliver the dynamite.

Al was arrested in connection to the destruction of the Bunker Hill and Sullivan's mine concentrator, and held in a stockade known as the "bull pen". He was soon released, but May continued to write letters to Governor Steunenberg of Idaho and to newspapers in the name of the Western Federation of Miners. She accused the Governor of taking bribes of up to $50,000 and being a traitor to the union cause.

In 1897, the Huttons invested in the successful Hercules silver mine.

== Labor activism ==
Both Hutton and her husband were active in the associated labor movements. She wrote a book about the horrible treatment of the miners at the hands of the mine owners, and the treatment of her husband at the hands of the sheriff/mine owners in her book The Coeur d'Alenes: or, A tale of the modern inquisition in Idaho. In later life, she bought all of the copies she could back. Hutton also supported an eight-hour work day and six-day workweek for women.

== Suffrage movement ==
Hutton was a supporter of the women's suffrage movement in Idaho. She met Abigail Scott Duniway and Emma Smith DeVoe there, and women gained the right to vote in Idaho in 1896.

Hutton was a candidate for the Idaho State Senate in 1904, but was defeated. She lost by 80 votes, blaming the $20,000 raised by mine owners for her opponent. She joined the National American Woman Suffrage Association in 1905 and attended their convention in Portland, Oregon that year.

In 1906, the Huttons moved to Spokane, Washington. She became a member of the Spokane Equal Suffrage Club and first vice-president of the Washington Equal Suffrage Association, which was then led by DeVoe. Hutton became a well-known suffrage leader in the Washington movement, but her outspoken style and unconventional behavior contrasted sharply with that of the more moderate DeVoe, a national suffrage organizer who was active in Tacoma, Olympia and Seattle. There was a great deal of conflict between the two, but they achieved their goal in 1910, when women regained the right to vote in Washington.

Hutton claimed to be the first woman from Spokane to register to vote after the 1910 election. Hutton and F. A. Fassett were the first two women to serve on a jury in Spokane County. After the election, Hutton focused on lobbying the state to enact an eight-hour workday for women.

Hutton was also one of four women to serve as delegates to the State Democratic Convention in 1912. She then served as a Washington delegate to the Democratic National Convention in 1912. She gained significant press coverage at the national level and gave speeches in Ohio in favor of women's suffrage on the return trip.

== Death and legacy ==
The last year of her life, she was ill with Bright's disease. She was known to travel in her chauffeured Thomas Flyer to farm communities, meeting farmers and trying to make matches to keep single mothers and their children together.

In her memory, Al started the Hutton Settlement orphanage in the Spokane Valley.
