= History of hard rock miners' organizations =

Hard rock miners' organizations have included fraternal and union organization of miners or mine workers formed for the purpose of addressing issues such as wages, health and safety, funeral arrangements of members, or widow's benefits. Fraternal organizations have tended to focus on welfare and community; union organizations and federations have included economic issues and negotiations with employers.

== History ==
Early miners' organizations were generally local, and were formed in response to specific developments such as wage cuts, or new technology introduced into the mines. Early unions sought to protect miners' rights, wages, status, and working conditions. Miners in the mid-to-late 19th century tended to be individualistic and independent. They tended to be more competitive than cooperative. When individual instincts conflicted with communal concerns, individual instincts often won. However, when mine workers' economic organizations came under attack, organizational philosophies underwent a transition in order to meet the challenge.

== Organizations ==
One of the oldest surviving fraternal organizations focused on hard rock mining, E Clampus Vitus claims an origin in 1845 in (what is now) West Virginia. It celebrates a frivolous culture, yet concerns itself with the welfare of members and their families in sickness and in death.

=== United Kingdom ===
An early hard rock miners' organization called The Miners Association was formed in the United Kingdom in 1858.

=== United States ===
The first effort to form a hard rock miners union in the United States occurred in 1863 in Central City, Colorado. That effort failed after a night of mayhem.

Also in 1863, a group of 300 to 400 miners at the Comstock Lode formed the Miners' Protective Association. The organization was formed to oppose a pending wage cut, and to create a benefit fund for sick and injured miners and their families. The wage cut did not occur, and the organization eventually faded.

In 1864 a new Cornish foreman at the Comstock talked of cutting wages. The miners tied him to a bucket and delivered him to the surface with a slogan, "Dump this pile of waste dirt from Cornwall". The wage cut that he had ordered was rescinded. But new miners were hired at a lower wage, provoking demonstrations by Virginia City and Gold Hill miners. This policy was also rescinded. The miners formed the Miners' League of Storey County. This organization was likewise a victim of its own success, threatened wage cuts were not imposed and the organization lost vitality. An economic slowdown in 1865 finally did result in a wage cut, and when the stock market crashed that year, the miners did not organize to oppose the lower wage.

In 1879 the Miners' Cooperative Union (MCU) in Leadville, Colorado was the first hard rock miners' union in the United States to affiliate with another organization, in this case the national Knights of Labor. Like many unions of the period, the MCU ceased to exist after its first labor strike. By 1888, however, there were 43 local Knights of Labor organizations in Colorado, including several in mining communities. The Knights opted for organizing all workers in an industry rather than restricting itself to the narrow concept of organizing workers according to their skills.

Scattered hard rock miner organizations were formed throughout the western United States between 1865 and 1892, when a violent struggle broke out at Coeur d'Alene, Idaho. The following year the Western Federation of Miners (WFM) was formed. The WFM followed the lead of the Knights of Labor and later, the American Railway Union in organizing industrially.

== See also ==
- History of mining
