= James A. Baker (trade unionist) =

James A Baker (fl. 1899 – 1903) was a Canadian miner who spent four years in Slocan, which was in south eastern British Columbia. He was a member of the Western Federation of Miners and became an elected official and the regional representative during a period of particularly bitter strikes.

It appears that the organizational part of the job wore him down and he did not stand for re-election in 1903. At that point he disappears from historical documentation. He left a legacy of a more militant and leftist B.C. mining unionism.
