= Hercules silver mine =

Hercules Mine
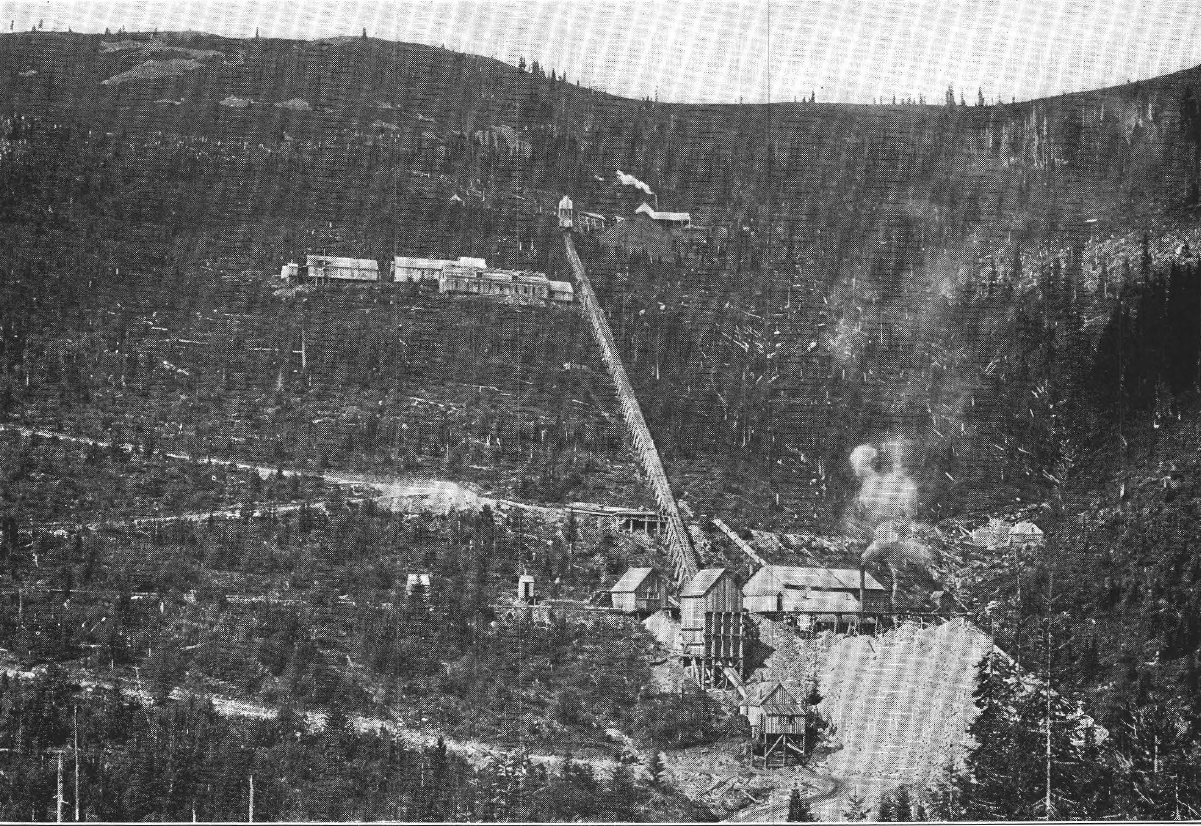
- 1904 image of the Hercules Silver Mine, Idaho

- Location within Idaho
- Location: Silver Valley (Idaho), Idaho, United States; 47.5425°N 115.81°W
- Products: Silver, Lead, Zinc, Copper, Gold, Nickel
- Type: Underground
- Discovered: 1889
- Opened: 1901
- Active: 1901-1925, 1930-1931, 1934-1935, 1937-1938, 1941, 1945-1960, 1962, 1964-1965
- Closed: 1965

The Hercules Mine was one of the richest lead/silver mines in the Coeur d'Alene Mountains in Burke, Idaho. It was discovered by Harry L. Day, a bookkeeper and clerk, and Fred Harper, a local prospector. In 1923 the mine owners founded the Day Mines, Inc. company. Other investors in the mine include August Paulsen, Levi Hutton, and May Arkwright Hutton. It eventually became the primary mine of the Hecla Mining Corporation.

Day and partners found silver-lead ore on 2 June 1901. The mine closed in 1924.

The original owners of this mine all shared a unique history together, all started out as pro union or involved with the 1899 explosion at the Bunker and Sullivan.

Levi "Al" Hutton was the engineer on the train used to move explosive from the frisco mine, to the concentrator. He claimed at gun point.

May Arkwright Hutton wrote a book about the horrible treatment of the miners at the hands of the mine owners, and the treatment of her husband at the hands of the sheriff/mine owners in her book. The coeur d' alenes: or, A Tale of the Modern Inquisition in Idaho. After the bonanza at the Hercules she spent the rest of her life buying all of the copies back that she could.

Ed Boyce, also an early investor, was president of the Western Federation of Miners in 1899. Boyce later hit it rich with the bonanza at the Hercules silver mine. He quit his post with the labor union and opened a fancy hotel.

== Harry Orchard as owner ==
One of the early owners of the Hercules Mine was Harry Orchard, who would later become a convicted assassin. Famed defense attorney Clarence Darrow argued during the Bill Haywood trial that Orchard was bitter about losing his one-sixteenth share of the Hercules Mine due to a declaration of martial law during a labor dispute. Darrow argued that this bitterness motivated Orchard to assassinate former Idaho Governor Frank Steunenberg. Orchard denied the charge, claiming that leaders of the Western Federation of Miners hired him to commit the murder, but the defense produced witnesses who testified that Orchard had vowed to commit the murder out of personal revenge. Haywood and other WFM leaders were found innocent; Orchard was found guilty and received the death penalty, although his sentence was commuted to life in prison.

== See also ==
- Harry Orchard
- Bill Haywood for more about Harry Orchard
- James McParland for more about Harry Orchard
- Ed Boyce
