= November 1897 proclamation =

The November 1897 proclamation of the State Trades and Labor Council of Montana was a reflection of western labor's assessment of the struggle between labor and capital after the failed Leadville Colorado, Miners' Strike. The proclamation, and the impetus behind it had a significant impact on the labor movement in the United States, Canada, and other countries for a period of several decades.

== The Leadville miners' strike ==
The Cloud City Miners' Union (CCMU), Local 33 of the Western Federation of Miners (WFM), declared a strike over wage cuts in the Leadville mining district in 1896. The CCMU wasn't adequately prepared for the opposition that it faced from the Mine Owners' Association and its allies. The defeat prompted the WFM to rethink its goals, its methods, and its ideology.

== History ==
The Butte Miners' Union (BMU) was Local Number One of the Western Federation of Miners. The BMU dominated the WFM in its early days, but control later passed to Colorado. While the WFM developed a reputation for radical politics and militancy in Idaho and Colorado, labor relations in Montana were more amicable.

By 1895, the BMU and other labor affiliates had formed the statewide State Trades and Labor Council in Montana. Butte's labor-management harmony lasted through much of the 1890s, but did not survive the industrial consolidations that arrived with the turn of the century.

== The proclamation ==
The 1897 proclamation argued that the old form of labor organization could not compete with "plutocracy". It declared that employers' interests were "always antagonizing" toward organized labor. Labor organizations in the eastern part of North America were described as having an "incapacity" to assist labor organizations in the West. The proclamation described "an absolute rejection" of the American Federation of Labor, of its conservative philosophy and its complacent demeanor. The proclamation proposed organizing western laborers and western unions into a new federation. The new federation was necessary to reflect the growing class consciousness of many Western labor organizations and their members.

== Text of the proclamation ==
To: Organized Labor Throughout the West:

Greeting—Believing that the time has arrived when an epoch will be marked in the history of labor, and believing that the necessities of the times as evidenced in recent developments emphasizes the fact that the old form of organization is unable to cope with the recent aggressions of plutocracy . . . ; and feeling the incapacity of organized labor of the east to aid us any in resisting these threatened encroachments . . . therefore the State Trades and Labor Council of Montana . . . would urge the necesity [sic] of concentrating and consolidating our forces, and would urge the organization under one head, of all unions west of . . . the Mississippi river . . . as at present our force and our means is dissipated, availing us but little. By combining our expense and our efforts to the support of one organization we concentrate our strength and strengthen our resources; furthermore we dissociate ourselves from . . . the older organizations and insure a unity and harmony of purpose among ourselves.

In the west nature has located its great mine of wealth, here are unlimited and varied natural resources. In the east society has located a class who subsist upon our revenues, and a class not alone who have no interest in, but rather one always antagonizing our interests, successful too often in defeating our purposes through their influence exerted at the ballot over the unorganized, uneducated labor they employ. . . .

Endorsed and referred to executive committee with instructions to forward the idea with all possible speed.

—State Trades and Labor Council of Montana, "Proposition to Organize a Western Federation for the Benefit of Western Unions," November 27, 1897

== The new federations ==
In Salt Lake City in 1898, the Western Federation of Miners and other labor organizations founded the Western Labor Union and subsequently, in Chicago in 1905, members of the WFM participated in the founding of the Industrial Workers of the World.
