= American Labor Union =

Former trade union of the United States

Logo of the ALU, 1905

The American Labor Union (ALU) was a radical labor organization launched as the Western Labor Union (WLU) in 1898. The organization was established by the Western Federation of Miners (WFM) in an effort to build a federation of trade unions in the aftermath of the failed Leadville Miners' Strike of 1896. The group changed its name from WLU to the more familiar ALU moniker in 1902 at its fifth annual convention. The group had a peak membership of about 43,000 — of which 27,000 were members of the WFM. The ALU was a precursor to the Industrial Workers of the World (IWW), established in 1905, which effectively terminated it.

== Organizational history ==
=== Forerunner ===
The Western Labor Union (WLU) was a labor federation created by the Western Federation of Miners (WFM) after the disastrous Leadville strike of 1896-97. The WLU was conceived in November, 1897 in a proclamation of the State Trades and Labor Council of Montana, and gained support from the WFM's executive board in December 1897.

=== Establishment ===
The WLU was formed in 1898 at a convention in Salt Lake City which was attended mostly by former members of the Knights of Labor. The new federation was formed as a response to the conservatism of the American Federation of Labor.

The hardrock miners of the WFM had become well-organized, but apart from the miners, mining territories were largely unorganized. Members of the WFM saw the WLU as an opportunity to meet the needs of these other workers, and also as a means to bolster solidarity when the need arose.

Eugene V. Debs assisted with the formation of the WLU. The federation initially comprised 14,000 miners and 400 individuals from other trades. Among the other trades were Colorado coal miners' locals, Colorado railway workers, western hotel and restaurant workers, carpenters, typographers, grocery clerks, laundry workers, cooks and waiters, hack drivers, and mattress makers.

After the transfer of the Western Federation of Miners headquarters [ to Denver, Colorado ] in 1900, and especially after the opening of a WLU office there in May 1901, the WLU began a period of astonishing growth. Of the seventy-one new charters the WLU issued to unions between May 1901 and February 1902, seventeen were to organizations in Denver. The WLU's initial base in Denver lay with the eleven hundred workers at the Globe and Grant smelters ... [ but the WLU ] represented a diverse array of urban workers—many, though not all, of them unskilled—organized mainly in industrial organizations.

One Denver WLU affiliate was the powerful Butchers Protective Union, with nearly fifteen hundred members in 1902. It included skilled butchers and unskilled meatpackers.

=== Renamed organization ===
In 1902, as a response to a visit of a delegation from the American Federation of Labor "to plead for a reunited labor movement," the WLU changed its name to the American Labor Union.

While at one time the American Labor Union claimed 135,000 members, a more sanguine estimate pegs the group's membership strength at 43,000 in 1905, which included 27,000 members of the WFM.

When the AFL excluded unskilled workers, the ALU accused that federation of exercising policies that divided the working class. However, the ALU favored Asian Exclusion. (A Chinese exclusion act had been passed in 1882, and wasn't repealed until 1943.) In the Cripple Creek district of Colorado where the ALU had a presence, many non-white nationalities were excluded or discriminated against. The Industrial Workers of the World, on the other hand, professed from its first conference in 1905 that there should be no discrimination against any worker.

The American Labor Union endorsed the Socialist Party in 1902, as did "all the major Colorado labor organizations." The ALU moved its headquarters from Butte to Chicago. It was in decline and on the verge of dissolution when it found new life in merging with other organizations into the IWW.

The American Labor Union employed the rhetoric of political socialism, although it focused primarily on economic action by workers. Such economic action would later be referred to as direct action by the Industrial Workers of the World.

=== Structure ===
The officers consisted of a President, Vice-President, Secretary-Treasurer, and an Executive Board of nine members, which included the President and Vice-president. The officers were elected biennially by a referendum vote of the general membership. The government was more centralized than the typical federation of trade unions of the time. For example, the executive board could depose any general officer, and affiliated organizations were not permitted to strike without the approval of the executive board.

The official organ of the American Labor Union were the weekly American Labor Union Journal. Price of the publication was 50 cents per year.

=== Termination ===
Three years after its founding the ALU took part in the creation of the Industrial Workers of the World (IWW).

== See also ==
- Western Federation of Miners
- Labor federation competition in the U.S.

== Official documents ==
=== American Labor Union ===
- Official Report of the Proceedings of the American Labor Union in its Fifth Annual Convention, Denver, Colorado, 1902. Denver: Western Newspaper Union, Printers, 1902.
- Official Report of the Proceedings of the American Labor Union in its Sixth Annual Convention, Denver, Colorado, 1903. Denver: Western Newspaper Union, Printers, 1903. —Includes constitution as appendix.

=== Western Federation of Miners ===
- Official Proceedings of the Ninth Annual Convention of the Western Federation of Miners of America: Held in Odd Fellows' Hall, Denver, Colorado, May 27 to June 6, 1901. Pueblo, CO: Pueblo Courier, 1901.
- Official Proceedings of the Tenth Annual Convention of the Western Federation of Miners of America: Held in Odd Fellows' Hall, Denver, Colorado, May 26 to June 7, 1902. Denver, CO: Colorado Chronicle, 1902.
- Official Proceedings of the Eleventh Annual Convention, Western Federation of Miners of America: Held in Odd Fellows' Hall, Denver, Colorado, May 25 to June 10, 1903. Denver, CO: Western Newspaper Union, 1903.
- Official Proceedings of the Eleventh Annual Convention, Western Federation of Miners of America: Held in Odd Fellows' Hall, Denver, Colorado, May 23 to June 8, 1904. Denver, CO: Western Newspaper Union, 1904.
