= Butte Miners' Union =

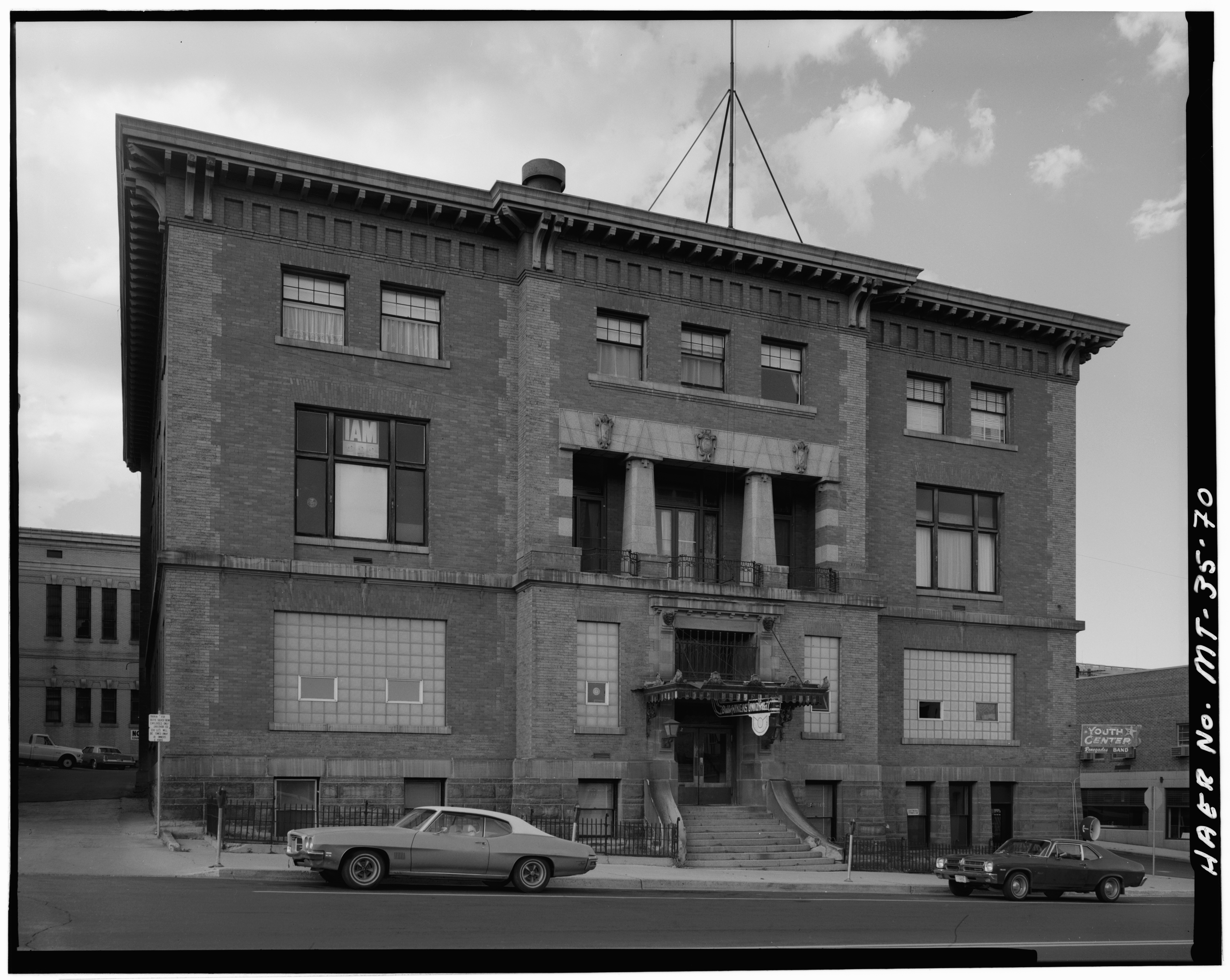
- Miners' Union Building in 1969
- Merged into: Western Federation of Miners
- Founded: March 1885
- Affiliations: Silver Bow Trades and Labor Assembly

The Butte Miners' Union, formerly known as the Butte Workingmen's Union, was formed in 1878 as a reaction to working conditions in the mines of Butte, Montana.

== Health issues ==
The fatality rate in the Butte mines were higher than Colorado's, Idaho's, and South Dakota's. Mines in Britain and Germany also did not experience such high fatality rates. Annually, 3.35 per 1,000 men were killed in the Montana mines from 1894 to 1908. Men died due to the typical mine accidents such as fires, cave-ins, gassings, and falls, but the greatest threat of all was miners' consumption (medically known as phthisis or Silicosis). In a study of Butte miners from 1916-1919 it was determined that 42% of the workers suffered from miners' consumption. Miners' consumption killed many workers and often led to worse diseases such as tuberculosis and pneumonia.

== History ==
The poor working conditions pushed the miners to organize, and when the Walker Brothers at the Alice Mine and A.J. Davis at the Lexington mine cut wages for unskilled underground workers from $3.50 a day to $3.00 a day, union mobilization was sped up. The skilled laborers, even though unaffected, stood by to support their coworkers. In peaceful protest led by Aaron Witter, an Indiana miner, the men won back their $3.50 a day wages and soon after on June 13, 1878 the Butte Workingmen's Union (BWU) was formed with Aaron Witter as President.

Within a matter of two weeks the Butte Workingmen's Union had 300 paying members. By 1885 the union had 1800 paying members. The reason for the quick increase in members was the decline in Comstock and Nevada mines in the early 1880s. In March 1885, the Butte Workingmen's Union decided to reorganize and renamed itself the Butte Miners' Union (BMU) while simultaneously disaffiliating itself anyone in the BWU who was not a miner. The men who were no longer members of the Butte Miners' Union went on to create smaller craft organizations.

In 1886, a few members joined the Knights of Labor placing the BMU under the powerful Silver Bow Trades and Labor Assembly which touted thirty-four separate unions and 6,000 members. In a show of strength in 1887, laborers threatened to lynch the superintendent of the Bluebird Mine in which they would end up winning full recognition of the closed shop. According to "Big Bill" Haywood, the Butte Miners' Union had the potential to take control over the entire Montana political structure had it not been for internal dissension between the Cornish and Irish Miners.

== Influence of the Butte Miners' Union ==
The Butte Miners' Union created branches all over Montana. Even across state lines the BMU had a presence. The miners' struggle in the Coeur d' Alene district of north Idaho witnessed the strength of the BMU when they were sent thousands of dollars in relief funds. The Butte Miner's Union mortgaged their own buildings to send more money as well.

In 1893 the Butte Miners' Union took the lead in forming the Western Federation of Miners. On May 15, 1893, forty delegates from fifteen regional unions, met at Butte and formed the organization that would represent the interests of these miners. Their platform called for an eight-hour workday, cooperation amongst workers and employers, removal of company stores and employment of child and convict labor, and the use of Pinkerton detectives to look into union affairs. The Butte Miners' Union became Local number one for the newly formed Western Federation of Miners Western Federation of Miners. BMU's own, John Gilligan served as the first president of the Western Federation of Miners.

== Songs ==
=== "Butte Irish Miners' Song" ===
Hurrah for Old Ireland, the land of good miners

The dear little isle I see in my dreams.

I'll go back to Old Ireland

to the girl who waits for me;

To hell with your mines and your mining machines.

=== "Miners' Union Day in Butte" ===
Me new green shirt I'll wear.
Six thousand miners will be marchin'
While I ride in stately ease,
Just like a Celtic warrior
As handsome as you please.
