= Leadville miners' strike =

Labor strike by miners in Leadville, Colorado

The Leadville miners' strike was a labor action by the Cloud City Miners' Union, which was the Leadville, Colorado local of the Western Federation of Miners (WFM), against those silver mines paying less than $3.00 per day ($116.10 in 2025). The strike lasted from 19 June 1896 to 9 March 1897, and resulted in a major defeat for the union, largely due to the unified opposition of the mine owners. The failure of the strike caused the WFM to leave the American Federation of Labor (AFL), and is regarded as a cause for the WFM turn toward revolutionary socialism.

Silver was discovered in Leadville, Colorado in the 1870s, initiating the Colorado Silver Boom. The Leadville miners' strike in 1896-97 occurred during rapid industrialization and consolidation of the mining industry. Mine owners had become more powerful, and they resolved not only to defeat the strike, but also to eliminate the union. The local union lost the strike and was nearly dissolved, marking a turning point for the local union's parent organization, the Western Federation of Miners (WFM).

The defeat forced miners to re-assess their tactics and their union philosophy. Although the federation was birthed as the result of a violent struggle and had engaged in a militant action in the Cripple Creek District in which miners used gunfire and dynamite, the organization's disposition and its Preamble envisioned a future of arbitration and conciliation with employers. After the Leadville strike, WFM leaders and their followers adopted radical politics and were open to more militant policies, breaking with the conservative, craft union based American Federation of Labor in the East.

== History ==
The union local in the Leadville mining district was the Cloud City Miners' Union (CCMU), Local 33 of the Western Federation of Miners. The Leadville strike was the first real test for the Western Federation of Miners, and the first strike into which the WFM poured significant resources. Coming just two years after the Federation's victory at Cripple Creek, the Leadville strike represented a significant hope that the mineworkers could solidify their power and continue their dramatic growth.

=== Impact of industrialization ===
Miners working in the industrial enterprise of underground metal mining often came from non-industrial backgrounds. Placer mining was gradually replaced by lode mining from 1860 to 1910, forcing miners to go deeper underground and resulting in an increasing level of industrialization. Tensions resulted from changing demands for job skills and work discipline.

By 1900, there were more than 4,000 miners in Leadville. Colorado's annual mining industry death rate in the 1890s was almost six deaths per thousand workers. As a death rate quoted for miners, the statistics were believed understated because they included surface workers as well as underground workers.

Before the 1890s, many hard rock mines were owned by the miners who had discovered them. Owners who had been miners were often more sympathetic to the concerns of miners. But the higher cost of industrialization changed that. The typical mine owners of the 1890s started out as bankers, managers, and businessmen who had never entered a mine, and whose primary concern was profitability. Lode mining took capital, and investors from the east and west coasts, and even from Europe, were actively courted. When the Colorado Legislature passed a law in 1887 prohibiting foreign ownership of real estate in Colorado, mine ownership was excepted.

Miners had long believed that they were treated poorly. For example, in 1894 a Leadville mine owner instructed the superintendent of the mine to delay a payday for the miners so that a dividend could be paid to stockholders. The WFM had advocated the eight-hour day since its founding convention in 1893. Some miners had the shorter hours, and public employees and building trades workers in Denver had won the eight-hour day as early as 1890. Yet in 1896, hoisting engineers in Leadville were required to work twelve-hour shifts. Mines were more dangerous as they were dug deeper; it was increasingly recognized that poor working conditions as well as longer hours could be correlated with poor health. In 1889 two Leadville workmen were sent to Denver to testify in favor of a mine inspection bill. Although it passed, it made no difference that year because the legislature failed to fund it.

=== Strike issues ===
During the financial crisis of 1893, the price of silver slumped, and to offset the lower silver price, mine owners cut wages for Leadville miners from $3 per day, down to $2.50 per day ($89.58 in 2025); for a twelve-hour shift, an hourly wage of $0.21 ($7.52 in 2025). By 1896, mine owners had raised the daily wage of most miners back to $3, but about a third of the workers were still receiving $2.50.

In May 1896, representatives of the CCMU asked the mine owners for a wage increase to bring all mine workers back up to the old wage of $3 per day. The union felt justified, for fifty cents a day had been cut from the miners' wages during the depression of 1893.

Some believed it was a bad time to demand a wage hike, because the economy hadn't yet fully recovered from the downturn. One mine owner claimed "we have not made a dollar in two years." But others observed that by 1895, Leadville mines posted their largest combined output since 1889, and that Leadville was then Colorado's most productive mine camp, producing almost 9.5 million ounces of silver. The mine owners "were doing a lot better than they wanted anyone to know." Mine owners Eben Smith and John F. Campion were writing letters discussing mine expansions and upgrading operations, such that "both men seemed, in their writing at least, to remain remarkably unconcerned about their overall financial prospects." Campion was attempting to purchase Italian marble, and other luxuries for his home during the strike.

=== The strike ===
On 26 May 1896, a union committee went to several mine managers to propose that the $3 daily wage be restored to the lower-paid workers, but all the mine managers they spoke to refused. From the start, mine managers and owners took the position that they were meeting and negotiating with miners, and refused to acknowledge that the miners were union representatives. A union committee again met with a group of mine managers on 19 June, and was again rebuffed, although some managers said that they would consider the idea. That evening, a union meeting attended by about 1,200 miners voted almost unanimously that all workers receiving $2.50 per day should go on strike. The strike began that night with the 11:30 shift change, and by the next day, 968 miners had walked out, shutting down a number of mines.

The mine owners retaliated with a lockout of all the rest of the Leadville mines, so that by 22 June, the entire mining district was idled, with a total of about 2,250 mine workers out of work. The mine owners turned off the dewatering pumps and allowed the mines to start to fill with water, showing that they were prepared for a long strike.

=== The forces arrayed ===
Many miners in the West trusted the Western Federation of Miners to stand up to industrialists. But the employers had the upper hand, and only a "remarkably resilient and cohesive" union could withstand and defeat them.

==== The employers ====
On June 22, in addition to agreeing to the lockout, the mine owners signed a secret written agreement to maintain a unified front against the union. They agreed that none of them would recognize the union or negotiate with it, and that no participant would agree to any concessions except by majority vote of the owners. The arrangement was later revealed in a report by the Colorado State Legislature.

Leadville city officials had been elected on the "Citizen's ticket," which favored the mine owners. The owners therefore had the cooperation of the city police, and most business, and other community leaders. The Leadville city police took the side of the mine owners. The sheriff of Lake County, on the other hand, had been elected on the "Populist ticket," which was pro-union.

Leadville mine owner John Campion hired labor spies from both the Thiel Detective Agency and the Pinkerton Agency to spy on the union. Campion hired additional spies to report on activities of replacement workers imported from Missouri. The total number of undercover company agents varied from one to four throughout the strike. The effective spy network ensured that mine owners had a complete and accurate description of union plans and activities, as well as the opinions and attitudes of union members. They implemented not just a lockout, but also a blacklist. They sought to co-opt union activities, and when their spies discovered divisions among the strikers, they exploited them.

During the strike in Coeur d'Alene just four years earlier, mine owners "claimed that they accepted miners' unions and were willing to work with them". In Leadville, mine owners essentially denied that unions had any right to exist. The owners refused to use the word "union". Their communications were addressed to miners, rather than to their organization. Some owners of mines with dewatering pumps may have threatened to turn off the pumps, flooding adjacent interconnected mine workings, along with their own, to keep the adjacent mines from meeting the union demands.

==== The union ====
In 1896 the Western Federation of Miners was already thought by contemporaries to be radical and militant, but was in fact dedicated to essentially conservative goals: decent wages paid in legal tender rather than scrip, health care for miners, restrictions on cheap immigrant labor, the disarming of detectives, and friendly relationships with employers. They envisioned an eventual end to confrontation and strikes. The WFM was unprepared for the determination and power that mine owners would bring to bear during struggles for union rights.

The Cloud City Miners' Union faced a difficult challenge. Their foes were wealthy and powerful, with the financial ability to lock out the miners, and to close down operations for months. Miners were faced with a loss of credit from local businesses.

The union membership contained internal rifts which came out under the pressure of a strike. National and ethnic divisions and differences in union philosophy were exacerbated by inadequate resources. There was distrust of the union leadership, as well as suspicion and jealousy over outside federation staff who were paid a salary higher than the strike allowance received by miners. Ethnicity was a major factor. A majority of the members were Irish-American, and they elected a union leadership which was almost entirely Irish-American. Other ethnicities, particularly the Cornish, resented the Irish monopoly on leadership positions, and suspected the Irish leadership of running the union to benefit Irish miners at the expense of Cornish miners and others. Local leaders sometimes resorted to coercion to maintain loyalty among some ethnic groups of miners.

Into this divided community, the mine owners hired spies to monitor and undermine the union. Spies supplied thousands of pages of daily reports on the internal workings of the CCMU; its divisions, its plans, its weaknesses. Although everyone knew that there were spies in the union (the details of secret union leadership meetings were printed the following day in the Leadville Herald Democrat), they never guessed their identities. Spies were entrusted with union security responsibilities, even with the responsibility of detecting possible spies. The spies faithfully recorded information about ethnic rivalries and philosophical disputes among die-hard and disillusioned unionists, militants and pacifists, optimists and pessimists, and the spy agencies passed that information on to the mine operators.

Most of the mines were outside city limits, under the jurisdiction of the Lake County sheriff. The county sheriff was himself a member of the WFM, as were 40 of his 43 deputies. Mine owners complained that armed groups of union men were allowed to threaten and intimidate workers at the mines, and that the sheriff was hostile and uncooperative when asked to provide protection against union violence.

=== Three months of standoff ===
Both the union and management held to an intransigent all-or-nothing attitude toward the other. From the start, the union leaders refused to negotiate compromise with the mine owners. In July 1896, the Colorado deputy commissioner of labor urged the union leadership to submit their issues to arbitration, but they rejected the idea, saying: "No; we have nothing to arbitrate." The unionists, not knowing of the owners' secret unity pact, believed that the mine owners would give in one-by-one.

The strike ran into troubles from the start. Other WFM locals, particularly the Butte, Montana local, sent financial support, but the AFL, with which the WFM was affiliated, refused to either provide financial support, or to call other AFL union locals out in sympathy.

On 16 July 1896, Peter Breene, who owned one-twelfth of the Weldon mine, one of the $2.50-per day mines, seized control of the mine, and reopened it paying $3.00 per day. The other Weldon mine owners went to court to have a receiver appointed in Breene's place. The court complied, but ordered the receiver to continue paying $3.00 per day. The miners celebrated, believing that the other mines would soon follow.

On August 13, the mine owners offered to raise the minimum daily wage to $3 for any month in which the price of silver was $0.75 or more per troy ounce. This would not have resulted in an immediate pay raise, because the price of silver was lower. Nevertheless, nearly two months into the strike and lockout, the offer seemed attractive to some of the strikers. The majority were already $3-per day workers, and had nothing personally to gain from the strike. Even some of the $2.50-per day miners considered that $2.50 was better than the nothing they earned while on strike. But when union members showed up for the special meeting called on August 17 to discuss the management offer, they found the union hall locked. The union leadership had abruptly and without notice cancelled the meeting. Some union members saw this as proof that the leadership intended to continue the strike regardless of the opinion of the rank and file.

The suspicion by some that the union leadership put its own interest before that of the membership was exacerbated by the fact that the outside labor organizers were paid $5 per day and the local leadership $4 per day during the strike, more than the miners made.

Their offer rebuffed by the CCMU leadership, the mine owners announced that if the miners did not return to work by August 22, they would re-open the mines, and import strikebreakers if needed.

In July, the union had received an order of 100 Marlin rifles. They gave 5 to deputy county sheriffs, and the rest to union miners. Striking miners armed with the rifles organized into paramilitary squads of "regulators," and patrolled the train depot and arriving stagecoaches, to expel any potential strikebreakers by threats, and by force if needed. A number of assaults on out-of-town strikebreakers were reported, and some arrests were made, but none were convicted because the victims could not identify their assailants. A British journalist described the standoff:

No surrender; no compromise; no pity. The owners mean to starve the miners to death; the miners mean to blow the owners to atoms.

A number of mines soon reopened, including some which paid $2.50 per day. Sources disagree on whether the mines were opened predominantly with out-of-state strikebreakers or returning Leadville miners. Some miners quit the strike and returned to work, and the number grew over the course of the strike. An estimated 1,000 miners left Leadville to seek work elsewhere.

At the request of Judge Owers, the owners delayed reopening the mines for one week. But negotiations went nowhere, and mines started reopening. The first to reopen was the Coronado mine, which reopened with 17 men. The Emmett mine also reopened.

The Bohn mine reopened on 4 September, but shut down after a few days when its employees were threatened and a number of them beaten.

Since early August, the mine owners repeatedly urged Governor Albert McIntire to send in the national guard to prevent violent attacks against mines and strikebreakers. They accused Lake County Sheriif M. H. Newman, a union member, and his deputies, almost all of whom were union members, of allowing the CCMU regulator squads to openly threaten and assault actual and potential strikebreakers. The sheriff denied the accusation, and expressed his confidence that the situation was well in hand. Without a request from the chief law enforcement official of Lake County, the governor denied the mine owners' request for troops. McIntire was regarded as "mildly pro-labor." He expressed some sympathy for the strikers, and defended the workers' right to withhold their labor.

=== Attack on the Coronado Mine ===
In a general meeting of the CCMU on September 16, 1896, union leaders "[cautioned] all of the members to be careful and keep sober and keep out of mischief." The next day the union issued a resolution that stated, "any violation of the law or disturbance of the peace by any member of this union endangers the success of our cause and is, therefore, treason to the cause..."

Just four days later, at about 1 am on 21 September 1896, a group of about 50 armed strikers attacked the Coronado mine, inside the Leadville city limits. At the mine were about 20 armed strikebreakers. The goal of the attackers was to get close enough to destroy the shaft house with dynamite bombs. They threw three dynamite bombs, and a number of incendiary bombs. About 1:45 am, the oil tank which supplied the boiler ruptured, and the spilled oil caught fire, forcing the defending strikebreakers to flee, while flames destroyed the shafthouse. The attackers then shot and killed a fireman trying to extinguish the resulting blaze. The miners working at the Coronado had killed two of the attackers, and mortally wounded a third.

The attackers then moved on to the Emmett mine, about half a mile away and outside of town, where in addition to dynamite and gunfire, they used a home-made cannon to fire shrapnel at the shaft house. The cannon blew a hole in the defensive wall, and the attackers tried to rush through the breach, but were driven back by gunfire from the strikebreakers. The attackers again tried to rupture the boiler fuel tank at the Emmett, but without success. The attackers finally withdrew, leaving one of their number at the scene, killed by gunfire. The El Paso, and R.A.M. mines were also attacked that night, but without casualties or damage. All four of the attackers who died were identified as members of the Western Federation of Miners.

The attacks, particularly the use of the home-made cannon, suggested organization and planning. The union identities of the four dead attackers, and their possession of Marlin rifles with serial numbers among those the CCMU had bought and distributed, led many to conclude that the union leaders were responsible, and arrests followed quickly. Ed Boyce, president of the national WFM was arrested, as were the officers of the local CCMU. A grand jury later indicted two miners, Charles Bone and William Rowe. The district attorney later admitted that he had no evidence against the union officers, and charges against them were dropped.

WFM President Boyce not only denied that the union was complicit in the attacks on the Coronado and Emmett mines, but also accused the mine owners of hiring the attackers.

=== Arrival of National Guard ===
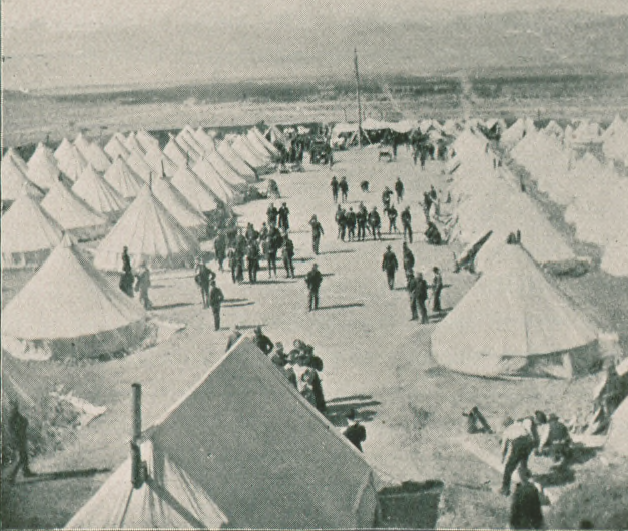
Encampment of the Colorado National Guard at "Camp McIntire," during the Leadville miners' strike of 1896-1897

On the morning of the Coronado mine attack, pro-union sheriff M. H. Newman telegraphed Governor McIntire asking for the immediate dispatch of the Colorado National Guard to prevent further violence. Pro-union judge Owers did likewise. With even the pro-union law enforcement officials of Lake County telling him that the situation was out of control, and that troops were needed, the governor had no choice. The first 230 guard troops arrived before nightfall on September 21, and by nightfall on September 22 there were 653 guardsmen protecting the mines from further attacks. Governor McIntire admonished Brigadier General E. J. Brooks in a private telegram to be impartial, not to take sides, and "Protect all parties alike from violence." But however impartial, the presence of guard troops was exactly what the mine owners wanted.

WFM leader Ed Boyce was one of twenty-seven union men jailed during the Leadville strike. Union leaders were charged, but charges were dismissed for lack of evidence. Although the attacks on the Coronado and Emmett mines were not proved to be authorized by union leadership, the fallout still hurt the union. With soldiers protecting strike breakers, the strike ultimately failed.

In addition to the national guard, on the day after the attack on the Coronado mine, pro-owner mayor of Leadville Samuel Nicholson announced that he would hire more policemen to assure peace. The police force, and particularly the new hires, many of whom came in from Denver, were hostile to the strikers.

Before guard troops arrived, the mine owners had been recruiting out of state, but had not yet imported strikebreakers. Those that had previously arrived were individual miners looking for work. But with the guard preventing violence and intimidation on the part of the union, the owners brought in unopposed the non-union miners that they had recruited in southwest Missouri. The first group from Missouri, 65 miners, arrived on 25 September, and another group of 125 arrived on 30 October. With the national guard troops preventing violence, the defeat of the strikers was assured.

Patrick Carney, a union miner, was accosted in front of his house in the early hours of 26 December 1896, by four strikebreakers from Missouri. One of the four shot Carney dead. The four were arrested, but all four were acquitted in a jury trial in Buena Vista.

In January 1897, a Leadville policeman named Guyton shot and killed striking miner Frank Douherty outside a saloon. Witnesses disagreed as to who shot first. Guyton pleaded self-defense, and was acquitted in a jury trial. Dougherty was the last of six union men who died during the strike, either at the hands of city policemen, strikebreakers, or under mysterious circumstances.

Although there was little way the strikers could win, the CCMU membership voted down a management offer in January 1897. This led to further disaffection of those miners who considered that the strike was lost. In addition, the Butte, Montana local of the WFM, which had previously been generous in sending financial aid to the Leadville strikers, cut its financial aid sharply on February 2, apparently unhappy that the Leadville local had rejected the management offer.

By February 1897, members of the CCMU executive committee were admitting that they had run out of funds, and that the strike was lost. Even WFM president Ed Boyce and labor activist Eugene Debs advised the CCMU to take what terms they could get. The union membership voted overwhelmingly on 5 March to accept arbitration. The arbitration decision went against them, but the union voted on 9 March 1897 to return to work at the old wage scale. It was a complete defeat of the union.

== Significance ==
Members of the CCMU drew from the strike two diametrically opposite conclusions. Some concluded that the union had been too intransigent for adopting an all-or-nothing stance in a strike they were unlikely to win, and should have taken what they could get from management. But others concluded that the union had been insufficiently radical, insufficiently violent, and that a strike could not be won while obeying the rules of law as they existed. The group that thought the union too militant were likely to quit the union. Those who thought that the union had erred by being too law-abiding and accommodating, which included most of the local and national leadership, tended to stay with the union. The result of the split was that the Leadville miners union was left much reduced in size, but also much more radicalized. The national leadership was also radicalized. WFM leader Ed Boyce advocated that each local should have a trained and disciplined "rifle club" capable of defeating local police and state militia.

When it was initially formed in 1893, the WFM shared the AFL's conservatism. But its experiences going up against Mine Owners' Associations and their allies convinced the WFM that acting in a non-threatening manner wasn't going to accomplish anything worthwhile. Many union members had begun to reconsider their conservative assumptions about confrontation and violence. By the late 1890s, the WFM believed that it would have to go toe to toe with mine owners and other employers. The WFM even considered creating rifle clubs for carefully chosen members.

The miners in the WFM realized that the old form of organization could not compete with "plutocracy". They concluded that the interests of employers were "always antagonizing" toward the interests of the union federation. The AFL ("organized labor of the east") could not help with the unique problems of the western miners. The solution was organizing western laborers and western unions into a new umbrella-like federation. These conclusions represented "an absolute rejection" of the AFL, of its conservative philosophy and its complacent demeanor.

== Western Federation of Miners relationship with the American Federation of Labor ==
The WFM had joined the American Federation of Labor (AFL) hoping for substantial financial support which had been promised by the larger federation. The WFM also hoped that the AFL would call out some of its members to support strikes by WFM locals, if necessary. During the Leadville strike, WFM President Boyce went east to ask for help in person from Samuel Gompers of the AFL, but was rebuffed. The AFL failed to provide financial support, and it refused to call out any of its unions in Leadville in support of the CCMU. AFL president Samuel Gompers refused to aid to the striking union local, because he suspected the local union leaders of striking for socialist ideological reasons.

Boyce later found common ground with former American Railway Union (ARU) leader Eugene Debs, who had become a socialist after the 1894 Chicago Pullman Strike by the ARU was crushed by federal government intervention.

== Western Federation of Miners relationship with elected officials ==
During the WFM's first major strike in Cripple Creek just two years earlier, Colorado Governor Waite, a Populist, called out the Colorado National Guard to protect strikers. This action, and the results of that strike, encouraged working class support for Populists. However, the fear of union militancy, and particularly a negative reaction to the WFM's successful Cripple Creek strike, helped to sweep Populists from power. Subsequently, the hostility of both Democratic and Republican officials during the Leadville strike caused some workers to distrust both major parties.

In 1899, members of the CCMU formed a section of the Socialist Labor Party. A western federation of labor called the Western Labor Union, formed by the WFM and other western unions in Salt Lake City in 1898, endorsed socialist candidates, and called for the abolition of the wage system. While the rank and file of the WFM did not specifically endorse socialism, they did pass resolutions which gave them a reputation for radical and revolutionary sentiments.

== Legacy ==
WFM leaders and federation members realized that they needed to build a more powerful organization. To do so, they jettisoned the "conservative and divisive self-interest" that had characterized the AFL and the western miners' organizations themselves up to that point.

The Leadville strike had winnowed out miners who were antagonistic toward, or not fully supportive of the union's goals. The members who were left agreed that they were engaged in a class-based struggle that called for a more militant and confrontational disposition. Employers themselves had dictated the old rules for the struggle, but after Leadville the union no longer believed those rules applied. Many of the WFM members were moving beyond reformist sentiments, to a realization that if they were to obtain the just solution that they sought, the system needed to be overturned. In a document called the November 1897 proclamation, the union miners and their allies vowed to launch a new federation which would reflect their growing class consciousness.

The Leadville strike set the scene not only for the WFM's consideration of militant tactics and its embrace of radicalism, but also for the birth of the Western Labor Union (which became the American Labor Union) and the WFM's participation in the founding of the Industrial Workers of the World.

The radicalization of the WFM resulted in the WFM endorsing revolutionary socialism, driving away allies among businessmen, politicians, and the middle class. The WFM embraced more violent strike tactics, and "entered into one of the most insurgent and violent stages that American labor history had ever seen." These events are sometimes called the Colorado Labor Wars After being frustrated in a number of smaller strikes, in 1903 the WFM called a strike in its long-time stronghold of Cripple Creek, Colorado, expecting a defining showdown between capital and labor. The result was a "climactic disaster", as "the WFM suffered the total destruction of its most stalwart local and the arrest of its most prominent leaders."

The WFM's radical views and violent tactics failed. "By the early 1910s, the Federation's days as the grand champion of western workers' rights and western radicalism were over."

== See also ==
- Colorado Labor Wars
- Ed Boyce
- Labor federation competition in the United States
- One Big Union (concept)
- Murder of workers in labor disputes in the United States
