= Western Federation of Miners =

Labor union of miners and metalworkers in the US and Canada (1893–1967)

WFM
- Western Federation of Miners
- Merged into: United Steelworkers; Canadian Auto Workers (CAW)
- Founded: May 15, 1893
- Dissolved: 1967 (1993 in Sudbury, Ontario)
- Location: United States of America, Canada
- Key people: Charles Moyer (President); "Big Bill" Haywood
- Affiliations: Industrial Workers of the World (IWW); American Federation of Labor (AFL); Western Labor Union (WLU), Congress of Industrial Organizations (CIO)

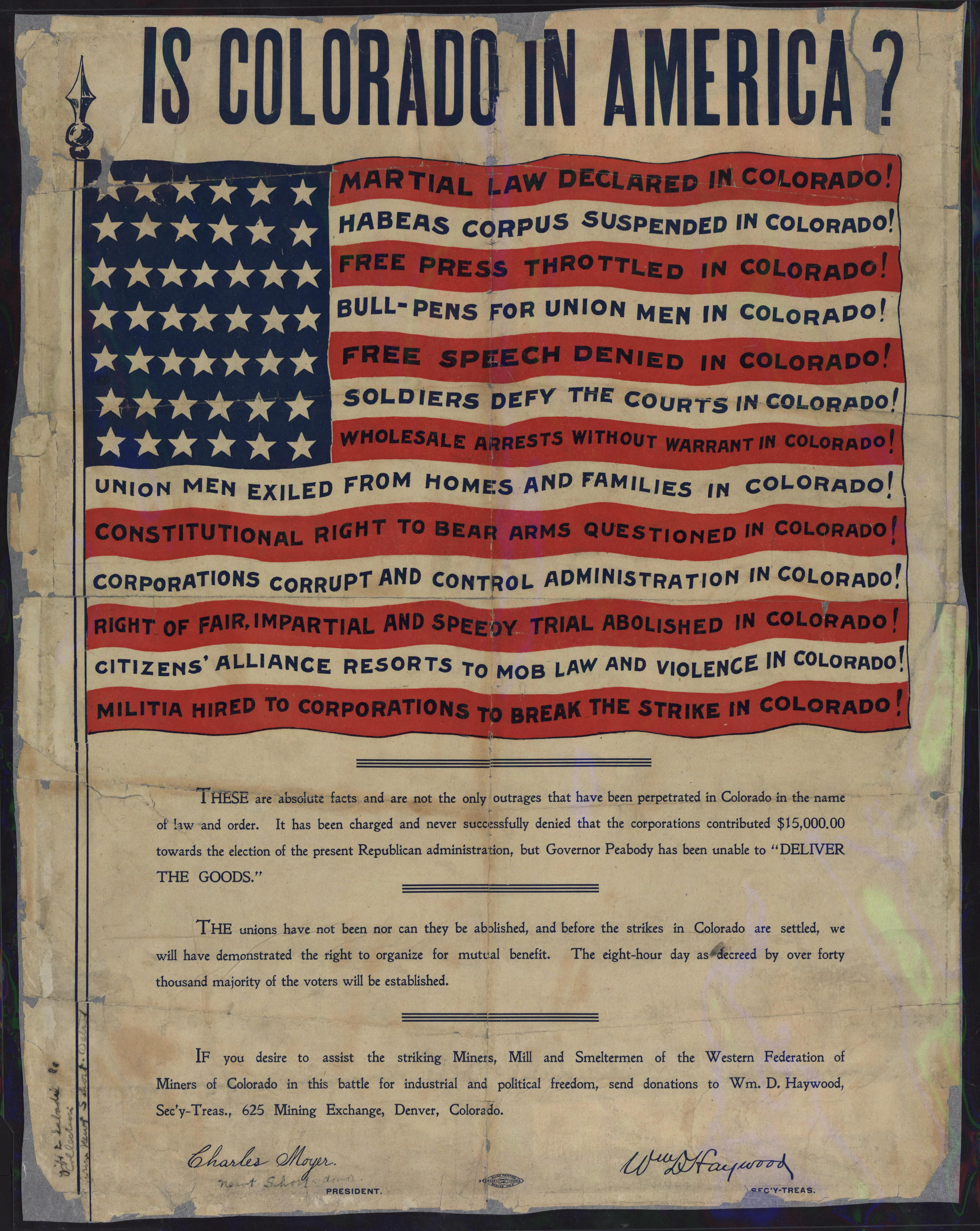
Famous Western Federation of Miners flyer entitled "Is Colorado in America?"

The Western Federation of Miners (WFM) was a labor union that gained a reputation for militancy in the mines of the western United States and British Columbia. Its efforts to organize both hard rock miners and smelter workers brought it into sharp conflicts – and often pitched battles – with both employers and governmental authorities. One of the most dramatic of these struggles occurred in the Cripple Creek district of Colorado in 1903–1904; the conflicts were thus dubbed the Colorado Labor Wars. The WFM also played a key role in the founding of the Industrial Workers of the World in 1905 but left that organization several years later.

The WFM changed its name to the International Union of Mine, Mill, and Smelter Workers (more familiarly referred to as Mine Mill) in 1916. After a period of decline it revived in the early days of the New Deal and helped found the Congress of Industrial Organizations (CIO) in 1935. The Mine Mill union was expelled from the CIO in 1950 during the post-war red scare for refusing to shed its Communist leadership. After spending years fighting off efforts by the United Steelworkers of America (USWA) to raid its membership, Mine Mill and the Canadian Auto Workers merged in 1967 and were able to retain the name Mine Mill Local 598.

== Founding ==
After hard rock miners made sporadic and often unsuccessful efforts to organize during previous decades, the Western Federation of Miners was established on May 15, 1893. The federation was formed through the merger of several miners' unions representing copper miners from Butte, Montana, silver and lead miners from Coeur d'Alene, Idaho, gold miners from Colorado, and hard rock miners from South Dakota and Utah at a five-day convention held in Butte, Montana. First president of the organization was John Gilligan and W.J. Weeks was the union's first secretary-treasurer.

Fred W. Thompson and Patrick Murfin have written,

The Western Federation of Miners was frontier unionism, the organization of workers who had become "wage slaves" of mining corporations rather recently acquired by back-east absentee ownership. They built their union when they were not yet "broken in" to the discipline of business management. [The WFM] had the militancy of the undisciplined recruits ... From the founding of the Western Federation in 1893, its story for twelve years is that of a continuous search for solidarity ...

The miners who formed the union had already experienced a number of hard-fought battles with mine owners and governmental authorities: in the Coeur d'Alene strike in February 1892, after company guards shot five strikers to death, the miners disarmed the guards and marched more than a hundred strikebreakers out of town. In response Governor N.B. Willey asked for federal troops to restore order; President Benjamin Harrison sent General John Schofield, who declared martial law, arrested 600 strikers and then held them in a stockade prison without the right to trial, bail or habeas corpus. Schofield then ordered local mine owners to discharge any union members they had rehired.

During the confrontation, the Coeur d'Alene miners received considerable assistance from the Butte Miners' Union in Butte, Montana, who mortgaged their buildings to send aid.

There was a growing concern that local unions were vulnerable to the power of Mine Owners' Associations like the one in Coeur d'Alene. In May 1893, about forty delegates from northern hard rock mining camps met in Butte, and established the Western Federation of Miners, which sought to organize miners throughout the West.

== History ==
=== Cripple Creek, Colorado strike of 1894 ===
Violence occurred in later strikes as well. At Cripple Creek, Colorado, after mine owners increased the working day from eight hours to ten, miners dynamited mine buildings and equipment. The county sheriff hired thousands of armed deputies, and then lost control of them. This 1894 struggle was one of the few strikes in which a state militia was called out to protect striking miners from an armed group supporting mine owners. Further violence was averted by the owners' agreement to return to the eight-hour day and improve miners' pay to three dollars a day – the standard that the union fought for across the west from that point forward. That success enabled the WFM to expand dramatically over the next decade, to the point where it had over two hundred locals in thirteen states.

=== Leadville, Colorado strike of 1896–97 ===
However, a struggle against mine owners in Leadville served to radicalize WFM leadership.

Representatives of the Cloud City Miners' Union (CCMU), Local 33 of the Western Federation of Miners, asked for a wage increase of fifty cents per day for all mine workers not already making three dollars per day. The union felt justified, for fifty cents a day had been cut from the miners' wages during the depression of 1893. Negotiations broke down and 968 miners walked out. Mine owners, who had formed a Mine Owners' Association with a secret anti-union agreement, locked out another 1,332 mine workers.

The owners hired labor spies to spy on the union, and additional spies to report on replacement workers.

Just days after union leaders publicly warned against violence, a violent incident occurred at the Coronado Mine. At least four union miners and one fireman were killed. Colorado Governor McIntire sent the Colorado National Guard to Leadville.

=== Short-lived alliance with the American Federation of Labor ===
The WFM affiliated with the American Federation of Labor in 1896, but WFM delegates came away from the AFL convention in Cincinnati,

...not only disappointed with the refusal to aid their big fight in Leadville, but with a feeling that they had not been associating with union men, or with men possessing the moral or intellectual fibre ever to become good union men.

The WFM withdrew from the AFL the following year. With the support of other organizations, including the State Trades and Labor Council of Montana, which issued a proposition to organize a new federation, the WFM created its own alternative to the AFL, the Western Labor Union (WLU). The WLU was formed in 1898 at a convention in Salt Lake City. Its goal was organizing all workers in the West.

=== Coeur d'Alene, Idaho confrontation of 1899 ===
Another confrontation in Coeur d'Alene was marked by violence.

The profitable Bunker Hill Mining Company at Wardner, Idaho fired seventeen workers believed to be union members. On April 29, 250 angry miners seized a train and rode it to a $250,000 mill at the Bunker Hill Mine in Wardner. The miners then set off three thousand pounds of dynamite in the mill.

At Idaho Governor Frank Steunenberg's request, President William McKinley sent the military to indiscriminately round up 1,000 men and put them into bullpens.

Emma Langdon, a union sympathizer, charged in a 1908 book that Governor Steunenberg deposited $35,000 into his bank account within a week after troops arrived in the Coeur d'Alene district, implying that there may have been a bribe from the mine operators. J. Anthony Lukas later confirmed the donation in his book Big Trouble,

In 1899, when the state needed money for the Coeur d'Alene prosecutions, the Mine Owners' Association had come up with $32,000—about a third of it from Bunker Hill and Sullivan—handing $25,000 over to Governor Steunenberg for use at his discretion in the prosecution. Some of this money went to pay [attorneys].

Idaho miners were held for "months of imprisonment in the 'bull-pen' — a structure unfit to house cattle – enclosed in a high barbed-wire fence." Some of the miners, never having been charged with any crime, were eventually allowed to go free, while others were prosecuted. Hundreds more remained in the makeshift prison without charges.

The Coeur d'Alene mine owners developed a permit-based hiring system to exclude union miners.

=== Growing radicalism ===
At their 1901 convention the WFM miners agreed to the proclamation that a "complete revolution of social and economic conditions" was "the only salvation of the working classes." WFM leaders openly called for the abolition of the wage system. By the spring of 1903 the WFM was the most militant labor organization in the country.

=== Colorado strikes of 1903–04 ===
The plan to organize the mill workers led to even fiercer battles with the refinery companies, who paid their workers half what miners earned for a ten- to twelve-hour day. When smelter workers went on strike in Colorado City, Colorado in 1903 it appeared that they might be able to win their demands without a serious fight, since the Cripple Creek miners were striking in sympathy with their demands. However, when one of the smelter operators refused to accept the deal brokered by the Governor of Colorado, James Hamilton Peabody, the Governor called in federal troops.

Peabody was a fierce opponent of unions and of any social legislation that limited businesses' right to run their own affairs as they saw fit. The crucial issue in Colorado was the eight-hour day. When the legislature had enacted a statute limiting the workday in hazardous industries, such as mining and smelting, to eight hours, the Colorado Supreme Court declared it unconstitutional. The voters of Colorado then passed a referendum authorizing the eight-hour day, but the smelter owners and Republican Party fought any efforts to pass a new statute implementing the amendment.

That power took the form of Colorado's National Guard, whose salaries were paid by the business community, not the State. Their commanding officer, General Sherman Bell, began arresting union leaders, strikers, and local public officials by the hundreds. Bell prohibited local newspapers from printing any material unfavorable to the military and ordered the arrest of the entire staff of a newspaper whose editorial had offended him. In Bell's words, "Military necessity recognizes no laws, either civil or social". When a lawyer for the union sought to free the prisoners on a writ of habeas corpus, Bell responded, "Habeas corpus, be damned! We'll give 'em post mortems!"

The violence intensified. After a mine explosion on November 21, 1903 killed a superintendent and foreman, Bell announced a vagrancy order that required all strikers to return to work or be deported from the district. When a bomb exploded at the Independence Depot near Victor, Colorado on June 6, 1904, killing thirteen strikebreakers, Sheriff H.M. Robertson went to investigate. The situation became very volatile, with throngs of angry men gathered in the streets.

The Cripple Creek Mine Owners' Association and an anti-union vigilante organization, the Cripple Creek District Citizens' Alliance, called a meeting at the Victor Military Club to formulate a response to the violence. A short time later Sheriff Robertson, whom the Mine Owner's Association deemed too tolerant of the union, was confronted and ordered to resign immediately or be lynched. Robertson was replaced with Edward Bell, a member of both the Mine Owner's Association and the Citizens' Alliance.

In a hostile environment ripe for provocation, the Mine Owner's Association and the Citizens' Alliance called a public meeting in a vacant lot across from the Western Federation of Miners union hall in Victor. Speeches against the union gave way to arguments, followed by fist fights and shooting. Two non-union men were killed and five others on both sides were wounded in the melee. WFM members took refuge in their hall, but Company L of the National Guard surrounded the hall and laid siege, firing into the building from nearby rooftops. Forty union members eventually surrendered, with four of them sporting fresh wounds. The Citizen's Alliance entered the building and trashed it. Vigilantes subsequently destroyed every union hall in the area, while General Bell used the National Guard to deport hundreds of strikers. General Bell closed the Portland Mine, owned by James Burns, because it had come to an agreement with the WFM.

=== Aftermath of the strikes ===
Although the courts eventually acquitted all union members charged with the bombing of the railroad station during the 1903–04 strike and awarded damages to those who had been deported, the strike and the union were broken in Cripple Creek; similar measures were resorted to in Telluride, Colorado. The actions effectively drove the WFM out of many of the mining camps in Colorado.

=== Mesabi Range strike, 1907 ===
On July 20, 1907, workers in the Mesabi Range organized their first strike against the Oliver Iron Mining Company. After two months, strikebreakers and a lack of external support resulted in the strike collapsing. Finnish-American workers were heavily involved in the organization of unions, then the strike, and were largely blacklisted from work following the strike's failure.

=== Bingham strike, 1912 ===
On 18 September 1912, about 4,800 miners struck Utah Copper Company "and all the principal mines, mills, and smelters of Bingham camp." Other Utah mine sympathizers brought that number to 9,000. The company enlisted an army of 5,000 besides having the protection of the Utah National Guard. The strike ended in October and at the end of the month, Daniel C. Jackling raised wages. It also saw an end to the Padrone system.

=== El Paso smelters' strike, 1913 ===
In April 1913, several hundred Mexican American workers at the American Smelting and Refining Company's copper smelter in El Paso, Texas, went on strike. During the strike, WFM officials competed with IWW officials to organize the workers with their respective unions. The WFM established a local union in El Paso and signed over 400 workers, though neither union was ever in control of the strike. While the strike ended in failure several weeks later, the WFM local remained.

=== Michigan copper strike, 1913–1914 ===
In July 1913, locals of the Western Federation of Miners called a general strike against all mines in the Michigan Copper Country. The strike was called without approval by the national WFM, which was extremely low on funds after the recent strikes in the west. The union supported the strike, but faced great difficulties providing pay and supplies to the strikers. Hundreds of strikers surrounded the mine shafts to prevent others from reporting to work. Almost all mines shut down, although the workers were said to be sharply divided on the strike question. The union demanded an 8-hour day, a minimum wage of $3 per day, an end to use of the one-man drill, and that the companies recognize it as the employees' representative.

The mines reopened under National Guard protection, and many went back to work. The companies instituted the 8-hour day, but refused to set a $3 per day minimum wage, refused to abandon the one-man drill, and especially refused to employ Western Federation of Miners members.

On Christmas Eve 1913, the Western Federation of Miners organized a party for strikers and their families at the Italian Benevolent Society hall in Calumet. The hall was packed with between 400 and 500 people when someone shouted "fire." There was no fire, but 73 people, 62 of them children, were crushed to death trying to escape. This became known as the Italian Hall Disaster. Shortly after the disaster, WFM president Charles Moyer was shot and then forcibly placed on a train headed for Chicago. The strikers held out until April 1914, but then gave up the strike. The WFM was left with almost no funds to run its operations or future strikes.

=== Loss of Butte, Montana ===
In 1914, the copper miners at Butte, Montana, split between those loyal to the WFM, and those supporting more militancy, many of whom sympathized with the more radical Industrial Workers of the World. The militants attacked WFM officials marching in the annual Union Day parade, and later blew up the WFM headquarters with dynamite. The dissidents established their own rival union, but neither the WFM or the new militant union was able to keep peace among the miners, so the mine owners did not recognize either union. The result was that at Butte, for many years a WFM stronghold, the mine owners did not recognize any miners' union from 1914 until 1934.

== Founding the IWW ==
The WFM's defeat led it to look for allies in the battle with employers in the Rockies, a struggle the union didn't want to concede. The Western Labor Union had renamed itself the American Labor Union in 1902. The WFM now sought to join with other advocates of industrial unionism and socialism to found a national union federation, the Industrial Workers of the World, in 1905.

The WFM had adopted a socialist program in 1901. "Big Bill" Haywood, who joined the union as a silver miner in Idaho, put the union's anti-capitalist stance in the simplest terms: he took the side of workers against the mine owners who "did not find the gold, they did not mine the gold, they did not mill the gold, but by some weird alchemy all the gold belonged to them!"

Haywood was the first chairman of the IWW; he defined its work as "socialism with its working clothes on". But factional differences the following year between the "revolutionists" and "reformists" within the IWW, which also divided the leadership of the WFM, led to the departure of the WFM from the IWW in 1907. After the split, former WFM leaders Bill Haywood and Vincent St. John left the WFM to work for the IWW. The WFM rejoined the AFL in 1911.

== Trial of Haywood, Pettibone and Moyer ==
When Frank Steunenberg, a former governor of Idaho, was murdered on December 30, 1905, the authorities arrested Charles Moyer, president of the union, Bill Haywood, its secretary, and George Pettibone, a former member, in Colorado and put them on trial for Steunenberg's murder. The prosecution relied heavily on the testimony of Harry Orchard, who claimed that the union had directed him to plant the bombs that killed supervisors and strikebreakers during the second Cripple Creek strike and that Haywood, Moyer and Pettibone had hired him to assassinate Governor Steunenberg.

The prosecution had depended heavily on the investigative work of James McParland who, acting as an operative for the Pinkerton Detective Agency, had helped convict the Molly Maguires three decades earlier, and felt confident that it would convict all three.

McParland persuaded Orchard that he could avoid the gallows if he testified that an "inner circle" of Western Federation of Miners leaders had ordered the crime. The prosecution of that "inner circle" of the union was then funded, in part, by direct contributions from the Ceour d'Alene District Mine Owners' Association to prosecuting attorneys who were, ostensibly, working for the state rather than for private interests. Upon hearing of this circumstance, president Theodore Roosevelt issued a particularly stern rebuke to Idaho Governor Frank Gooding, describing such a state of affairs as the "grossest impropriety":

If the Governor or the other officials of Idaho accept a cent from the operators or from any other capitalist with any reference, direct or indirect, to this prosecution, they would forfeit the respect of every good citizen and I should personally feel that they had committed a real crime.

Roosevelt's strong words came in spite of the fact that he had already concluded the WFM leaders were guilty. Governor Gooding's response to the President provided a severely distorted account of the financial arrangements for the trial, and a promise to return money contributed by the mine owners. Gooding then:

...kept the narrowest construction of his promise to the president... [He then proclaimed publicly and often that] no dollar has been or will be supplied from any private source or organization whatsoever, [and then] went right on taking money from the mine owners.

In addition to Idaho mine owners, powerful and wealthy industrialists outside of Idaho were also tapped in an effort to destroy the Western Federation of Miners. Donations for the prosecutorial effort estimated in the range of $75,000 to $100,000 were simultaneously solicited and forwarded from the Colorado Mine Owners' Association and other wealthy Colorado donors. Mining interests in other states – Nevada and Utah, for example – were approached as well.

The defense hired Clarence Darrow, the most renowned lawyer of the day, who had represented Eugene V. Debs several years earlier. In spite of the combined efforts of state and local governments in Idaho and Colorado, the Mine Owners' Associations, the Pinkerton and Thiel Detective Agencies, and other interested industrialists, the jury acquitted Bill Haywood. Pettibone was also acquitted early the next year, and all charges against Moyer were dropped. In a separate prosecution, Orchard was convicted and sentenced to death. His sentence was commuted, and he spent the rest of his life in an Idaho prison. Orchard died in prison in 1954.

== Mine Mill ==
The failure of later strikes and the depression of 1914 brought about a sharp decline in the WFM's membership. In 1916 the union changed its name to the International Union of Mine, Mill, and Smelter Workers. The union had become largely ineffective, riddled with members who passed information on to their employers, and unable to win substantial gains for its members for most of the next two decades.

Things changed, however, in 1934 when miners and smeltermen revitalized the union. Returning to its militant roots, the union spread throughout the west from its base in Butte, and then into the South and Canada. There were also union locals in non-ferrous smelters in New Jersey – in Perth Amboy at the American Smelting and Refining Company (ASARCO), and in Carteret at the U.S. Metals Company. The union was one of the original members of the Committee for Industrial Organizing, which later transformed itself into the Congress of Industrial Organizations.

The union also returned to its radical political traditions, as members of the Communist Party USA came to hold the presidency of the union in the late 1940s. That, however, sparked further disagreements over leadership and expenditures and, as the postwar red scare picked up momentum, prompted raids by the United Steelworkers of America, the United Auto Workers and other unions, particularly in mining in the South, where the CIO encouraged predominantly white miners' locals to defect. The CIO formally expelled the union in 1950 after it refused to remove its communist leaders.

The union soldiered on for another seventeen years, finding itself increasingly outmatched in its battles with employers. While it defeated all of the Steelworkers' efforts to replace it in its western strongholds in the 1950s, it had a harder time holding on to its outposts in the South. In addition, more conservative members, uneasy with the union's foreign policy and with the increasing number of African-American and Mexican-American unionists, tried to take their locals out of the union, opening up fissures that weakened the union's strikes against the Anaconda Copper Mining Company in 1954 and 1959. The union eventually merged with the Steelworkers in 1967 after losing locals to it in Butte and Canada. Only Local 598 in Sudbury, Ontario, which had a contentious and sometimes violent history with the city's Steelworkers locals, voted against the merger – it remained autonomous until 1993, when it merged with the Canadian Auto Workers.

== Salt of the Earth ==
The 1954 movie Salt of the Earth, directed by Herbert J. Biberman, a member of the blacklisted Hollywood Ten, portrays a year-and-a-half long strike by New Mexico zinc miners who belonged to Mine Mill; many of the actors were rank-and-file members of that union. The producers found it difficult, however, to recruit Anglo actors to play strikebreakers or deputy sheriffs; those who disliked the union wanted nothing to do with it, while those who sympathized did not want to be seen switching sides, even as actors.

The movie's star, Rosaura Revueltas, was deported during the shooting of the film, requiring the producers to use a double in some scenes and to shoot film of others and record her narration in Mexico. The home of one of the union members/actors and the union hall were burned down shortly after the end of shooting. Clinton Jencks, the Mine Mill organizer depicted in the film, was thereafter convicted of falsely stating he was not a communist on the affidavit required of all union representatives under the Taft-Hartley Act; his conviction was overturned by the Supreme Court in Jencks v. United States, 353 U.S. 657 (1957).

The producers were unable to find a post-production house in Hollywood willing to process the film or skilled editors willing to work on it, other than under pseudonyms or at night. The film was shown at only a few theaters; most theaters rejected it, including some that had originally agreed to show it. Union projectionists refused to show it at some theaters that had accepted it.

The struggle to produce the film, pictures and information about the original strike, along with the film itself in its entirety, is available on DVD from www.Organa.com. The Special Edition also includes the film Hollywood Ten.

== Presidents ==
1893: John Gilligan
1894: W. J. Weeks
1894/5: Patrick Clifford
1895: S. M. Ronerts
1895/6: James Leonard
1896: Edward Boyce
1902: Charles Moyer
1926:
1933: Thomas H. Brown
1936: Reid Robinson
1947: Maurice Travis (acting)
1947: John R. Clark
1963: Al Skinner

== See also ==
- Anti-union violence
- Vincent Saint John
- Industrial Workers of the World
- Labor federation competition in the U.S.
- James A. Baker
- Jencks Act
- Jencks v. United States
- Progressive Miners of America
- The Ladies Auxiliary of the International Union of Mine Mill and Smelter Workers
- Seeberville Murders

== Official documents ==
- Official Proceedings of the Ninth Annual Convention of the Western Federation of Miners of America: Held in Odd Fellows' Hall, Denver, Colorado, May 27 to June 6, 1901. Pueblo, CO: Pueblo Courier, 1901.
- Official Proceedings of the Tenth Annual Convention of the Western Federation of Miners of America: Held in Odd Fellows' Hall, Denver, Colorado, May 26 to June 7, 1902. Denver, CO: Colorado Chronicle, 1902.
- Official Proceedings of the Eleventh Annual Convention, Western Federation of Miners of America: Held in Odd Fellows' Hall, Denver, Colorado, May 25 to June 10, 1903. Denver, CO: Western Newspaper Union, 1903.
- Official Proceedings of the Eleventh Annual Convention, Western Federation of Miners of America: Held in Odd Fellows' Hall, Denver, Colorado, May 23 to June 8, 1904. Denver, CO: Western Newspaper Union, 1904.
