= Industrial Congress =

Industrial Congress may refer to:

- The first labor organization gathering to be described as an Industrial Congress was the founding convention of the Industrial Workers of the World, which took place in 1905.
- A labor organization with a similar name, the Congress of Industrial Organizations, or the CIO, was founded in 1935 by eight unions that were a part of the American Federation of Labor.
