= Industrial Union Convention =

Industrial Union Convention may refer to:

- First Convention of the Industrial Workers of the World, also known as the Industrial Union Convention, the founding convention of the Industrial Workers of the World
- The founding convention of the Congress of Industrial Organizations, also known as the industrial union convention
- Any convention by an industrial union
