= Industrial Workers of the World philosophy and tactics =

Union protest tactics

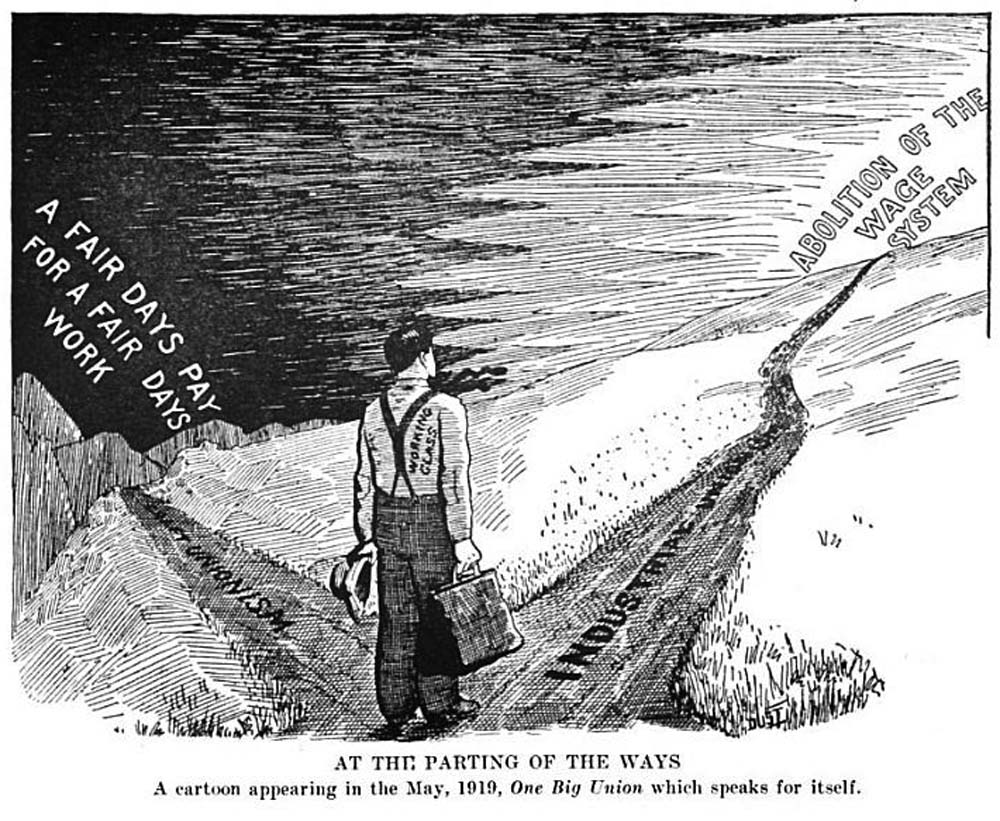
"At the Parting of the Ways", a cartoon from the May 1919 Industrial Workers of the World periodical One Big Union which shows a worker representing the working class choosing between a path of craft unionism towards the AFL slogan "A Fair Day's Pay for a Fair Day's Work" and a path of industrial unionism towards the IWW slogan "Abolition of the Wage System"

The Industrial Workers of the World (IWW) is a union of wage workers which was formed in Chicago in 1905 by militant unionists and their supporters due to anger over the conservatism, philosophy, and craft-based structure of the American Federation of Labor (AFL). Throughout the early part of the 20th century, the philosophy and tactics of the IWW, also known as Wobblyism, were frequently in direct conflict with those of the AFL (forerunner of the AFL–CIO) concerning the best ways to organize workers, and how to best improve the society in which they toiled. The AFL had one guiding principle—"pure and simple trade unionism", often summarized with the slogan "a fair day's pay for a fair day's work." The IWW embraced two guiding principles, fighting like the AFL for better wages, hours, and conditions, but also promoting an eventual, permanent solution to the problems of strikes, injunctions, bull pens, and union scabbing.

The AFL and the IWW (whose members are referred to as Wobblies) had very different ideas about the ideal union structure. While the AFL primarily organized workers into their respective crafts, the IWW was created as an industrial union, placing all workers in a factory, mine, mill, or other place of business into the same industrial organization. The IWW also promotes the class-based concept of One Big Union.

The IWW was formed by militant unionists, socialists, anarchists, and other labor radicals who believed that the great mass of workers are exploited by, and are in an economic struggle with, an employing class. The IWW employed a great diversity of tactics aimed at organizing all workers as a class, seeking greater economic justice on the job and, ultimately, the overthrow of the wage system which they believe is most responsible for keeping workers in subjugation. Such tactics are generally described as direct action, which is distinguished from other types of reform efforts such as electoral politics. IWW members believe that change accomplished via politics depends upon appeal to members of a ruling class who derive benefit from the subservient quiescence of the working class.

While other unions (such as the CIO) adopted form and tactics—notably, industrial unionism and the sit down strike—which were developed or pioneered by the IWW, labor laws passed by legislatures have sought to steadily erode the range and diversity of methods employed by all labor organizations. Confronted with such obstacles, militant IWW members tend to believe in a return to a union philosophy that was common a century ago, in which unjust labor laws are challenged directly by union actions, rather than accepted as a framework within which the union must operate.

== Wobbly understanding of the world ==
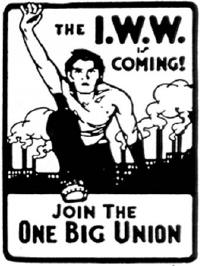
One Big Union sticker

By 1912, after a number of defections and splits, the IWW numbered some twenty-five thousand, much smaller than many of its rival unions. But the IWW's influence was already outsized. The Congressional Commission on Industrial Relations noted in 1916 that "as a 'spirit and vocabulary' [the IWW] permeates to a large extent enormous masses of workers..." Wobbly activists were those workers who not only reacted to economic forces, but who spent a considerable amount of time thinking, debating, and educating their co-workers about the impact of such forces upon society. John Reed observed, "Wherever, in the West, there is an IWW local, you will find an intellectual center ... a place where men read philosophy, economics, the latest plays, novels; where art and poetry are discussed, and international politics."

The IWW printed hundreds of thousands of leaflets, promoted Industrial Education Clubs, and organized Propaganda Leagues. Stickered slogans, referred to as "silent agitators", were printed by the million, and made available by the thousand. IWW libraries in union halls made available to any worker not only the organization's publications, but also practical topics about machinery and production, as well as classic works of scientists, theoreticians, and philosophers. Knowledge and experience were likewise shared—new members were sometimes invited to chair meetings, not just to share the experience, but to initiate them into the community.

Wobblies believed not only that it took a working person to understand the needs of the workers, but in order to lead, that person must also be an educated worker. IWW publications seemed to enjoy reporting on "the amazement shown by college professors who heard Wobbly speakers deliver talks upon a wide variety of subjects and reveal a remarkable understanding of complex economic and social questions." By the time of the organization's founding in 1905, inquisitive workers already had a wide variety of union experiences and traditions to consider. In coming together as an organization, then, it is perhaps not surprising that the clash of ideas among IWW members resulted in passionate debate and an eventual winnowing of philosophies over several decades of evolution.

=== Inspiration ===
Where did initial inspirations for the Wobbly philosophy come from? Historian Melvyn Dubofsky is worth quoting at length:

Wobblies ... took their basic concepts from others: from Marx the concepts of labor value, commodity value, surplus value, and class struggle; from Darwin the idea of organic evolution and the struggle for survival as a paradigm for social evolution and the survival of the fittest class; from Bakunin and the anarchists the "propaganda of the deed"* and the idea of direct action; and from Sorel the notion of the "militant minority." Hence, IWW beliefs became a peculiar amalgam of Marxism and Darwinism, anarchism and syndicalism—all overlaid with a singularly American patina.

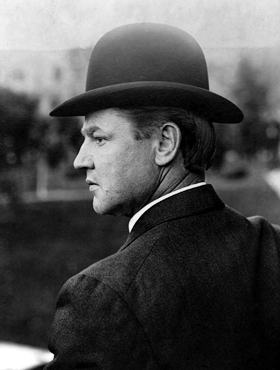
Bill Haywood

However, Dubofsky also identifies American traditions "dating back to the era of Jefferson and Jackson" from which the Wobblies derived inspiration, particularly the concepts of a society divided into "producers and nonproducers, productive classes and parasites." Paul Brissenden likewise stated that, "[t]he main ideas of I.W.W.-ism—certainly of the I.W.W.-ism of the first few years after 1905—were of American origin, not French, as is commonly supposed.

Wobblies sought to familiarize theoretical terminology for a worker audience of varied educative experience. A proletarian became a prole, and a plutocrat was a plute. Bill Haywood, in particular, had the ability to translate complex economic theories into simple ideas that resonated with working people. He would frequently preface his speeches with the statement, "Tonight I am going to speak on the class struggle and I am going to make it so plain that even a lawyer can understand it." The Marxian concept of surplus value, Haywood conveyed simply as "unpaid labor." He distilled the voluminous work of Karl Marx into a simple observation, "If one man has a dollar he didn't work for, some other man worked for a dollar he didn't get."

Philip S. Foner disagreed with Dubofsky on this one point, stating, "[t]he I.W.W. did not, as did many, if not all, anarchists, advocate 'propaganda of the deed'." Taft and Ross likewise appear to disagree with Dubofsky, stating in more general terms, "violence in labor disputes was seldom inspired by the doctrine of 'propaganda by the deed,' whose self-defeating nature convinced many of its exponents of its fallacy." The difference may depend upon how 'propaganda of the deed' is defined.

== Question of political action ==
By the time of the 1905 founding of the Industrial Workers of the World, the question of whether unionized workers could secure significant change by political actions of their unions had been in contention for some decades. The question had split the National Labor Union in 1872. It created divisions between the membership and the leadership of the Knights of Labor, with the leaders favoring various political agendas including Greenbackism, socialism, and land reform. Labor historian Joseph Rayback believed that significant losses for organized labor in the 1890s pointed the way toward either socialism, or industrial unionism in order to maintain organized labor's momentum.

Yet Samuel Gompers, leader of the American Federation of Labor, opposed both courses of action. He and John Mitchell, head of the United Mine Workers, joined an alliance of conservative union leaders and liberal business men in forming the National Civic Federation (NCF). That organization's critics on the left believed that its goals were to suppress sympathy strikes, and to replace traditional expressions of working class solidarity with binding national trade agreements and arbitration of disputes.

By 1905, the NLU was history, and the Knights of Labor mostly a memory. Mitchell and Gompers of the AFL were beginning to build an alliance with the Democratic Party. While the focus upon political alliance by the AFL (at the perceived cost of class solidarity) was just one aspect of the differing union philosophies, it was a significant one. The formation of the Industrial Workers of the World was in many ways a direct response to the conservatism of the AFL, and its perceived failure to respond to the needs of western miners, lumbermen, and others. However, the political question would likewise play a central role in the internal disputes, and in the eventual evolution of the IWW itself.

== Early philosophy a compromise ==
At its opening convention, the Industrial Workers of the World exhibited a "spirit of unity." Although nearly all of the delegates were committed to some form of Socialist politics, there were some significant philosophical differences just under the surface. Western Federation of Miners members and other union veterans wanted the participation of the two Socialist parties, the Socialist Labor Party (SLP) and the Socialist Party, in spite of longstanding animosity between these two political organizations. However, the veteran labor activists did not wish to commit to any particular political party. Nonetheless, some of the Socialists in both camps assumed that an endorsement would be forthcoming.

The IWW Constitution and Preamble resulting from the 1905 convention were essentially a compromise which papered over these, and other differences. Furthermore, while the SLP viewed organized labor as a mere adjunct to Socialist Labor Party politics, the Socialist Party was divided over whether the AFL, or the new IWW should be the proper vehicle to carry the labor banner of socialism. As a result, many Socialists actually opposed the IWW from the outset.

The early IWW experienced numerous divisions and splits during the period from 1905 to approximately 1930. It also suffered repression by business and government entities during this period. These experiences had a profound effect on the philosophy and tactics of the organization that survived.

== IWW vs. the AFL ==
In spite of the varied philosophies of the participants at the first IWW convention, there were a few compelling concerns which united all. Nearly all who attended acknowledged an "irrepressible conflict" between capital and labor. Nearly all could be described as adherents of industrial unionism, as opposed to the craft unionism of the American Federation of Labor. Acknowledging the common practice of AFL craft unions crossing each other's picket lines, the IWW adopted the WFM's description of the AFL as the "American Separation of Labor." In addition to the limitations of organizing by craft, the IWW criticized the AFL for emphasizing common interests between labor and capital, and for organizing only elite workers rather than acknowledging the needs of the entire working class.

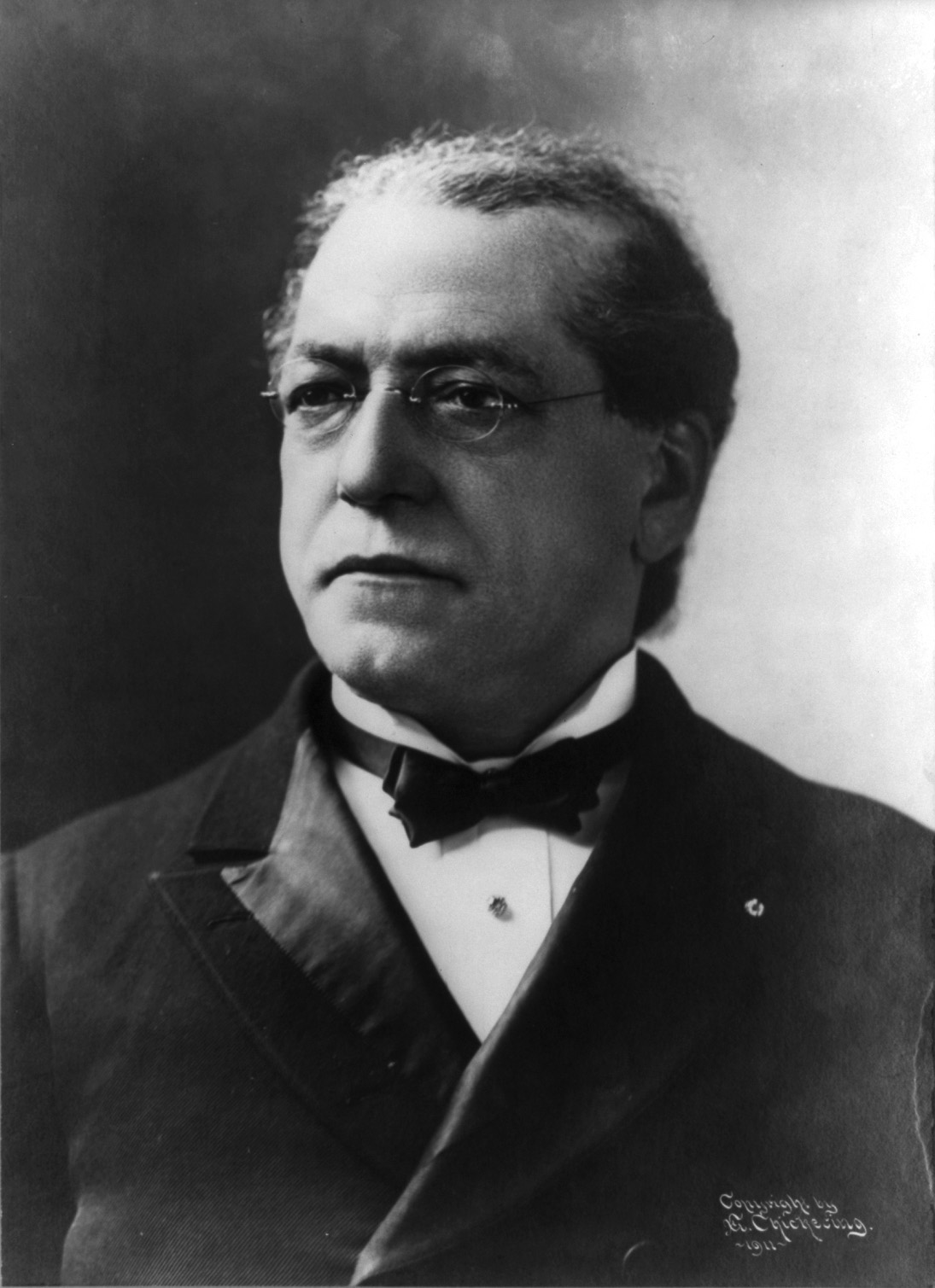
Samuel Gompers, head of the American Federation of Labor

The AFL was bitterly attacked by speakers who organized the conference, such that many would have been pleased if the federation (although not necessarily its constituent unions) would simply cease to exist. Samuel Gompers responded by declaring that the IWW's organizers were "trying to divert, pervert, and disrupt the labor movement of the country," describing them as "pirates" and "kangaroos." Calling the AFL outdated was "inexcusably ignorant and maliciously false," said Gompers. Referring to the birth of the IWW, Gompers commented that "[t]he mountain labored and brought forth a mouse, and a very silly little mouse at that... historians will record the Chicago [founding of the IWW] as the most vapid and ridiculous in the annals of those who presume to speak in the name of labor..."

Gompers warned all AFL affiliates not to cooperate with IWW members, and told AFL members not to support IWW strikes. Permission was granted to cross IWW picket lines. Although the AFL had offered some support to the Western Federation of Miners in the aftermath of the Colorado Labor Wars, that assistance was discontinued because of WFM affiliation with the IWW. A number of AFL affiliates—machinists, carpenters, hat makers, leatherworkers, and others—decreed that any individual with an IWW card would not be allowed to work in their industries.

The IWW fought for workers' rights somewhat differently from the AFL. Staughton Lynd described the IWW as "devoting itself to struggles around demands, rather than negotiating contracts." Paul Buhle lauds the idealism and creativity of the IWW, while asserting that "the AFL could not claim a single cultural contribution of note." Melvyn Dubofsky described the AFL "[growing] fat while neglecting millions of laborers doomed to lives of misery and want", and the IWW offering to do what the AFL declined to do by giving hope to those neglected. Yet Dubofsky believed he saw a contradiction between the IWW's goal of a better society, and the desires of its individual members for an improved life. As workers managed to improve their own lives, he theorized, they would have less interest in an improved society. And, the IWW was up against "flexible and sophisticated adversaries..." Those adversaries, as often as not, included the AFL.

== IWW philosophy evolves ==
The IWW organized many who were "left out" of American society, including "timber beasts, hobo harvesters, itinerant construction workers, exploited eastern and southern European immigrants, racially excluded African Americans, Mexicans, and Asian Americans." Due to feelings of alienation and impotence, these workers embraced radical theories aimed at disrupting and replacing the established social order. The IWW maintained low initiation fees and dues, allowed universal transfer of union cards, and disdained apprenticeships in order to attract the lower strata of working society.

As a result of the splits and de facto purges, the IWW distilled a core set of beliefs and practices. It eschewed political entanglements for revolutionary industrial unionism. the Wobblies of the IWW sought to "comprehend the nature and dynamics of capitalist society and through increased knowledge, as well as revolutionary activism, to develop a better system for the organization and functioning of the American economy."

=== Two guiding principles ===
Labor Historian Melvyn Dubofsky has written that the IWW held "an instinctive distaste for the world as it was, as well as hope for the creation of a completely new world." Yet in addition to a belief in eventual revolution, the IWW "constantly sought opportunities to improve the immediate circumstances of its members."

Marxist Labor Historian Philip S. Foner identifies the same points in the manifesto which called the labor activists to the founding conference in 1905. On the back of each manifesto was printed a declaration of the two requirements for any labor organization to properly represent the workers:

First – It must combine the wage workers in such a way that it can most successfully fight the battles and protect the interests of the working people of to-day in their struggles for fewer hours, more wages and better conditions.

Secondly – It must offer a final solution of the labor problem – an emancipation from strikes, injunctions and bull-pens.

IWW co-founders Father Thomas J. Hagerty and William Trautmann continued promoting these two essential goals in their 1911 pamphlet, One Big Union. The IWW needed to "combine the wage-workers in such a way that it can most successfully fight the battles and protect the interests of the workers of today in their struggles for fewer hours of toil, more wages and better conditions," and it also "must offer a final solution of the labor problem—an emancipation from strikes, injunctions, bull-pens, and scabbing of one against the other."

=== For and against the system ===
Historian Daniel R. Fusfeld referred to the conflicting labor philosophies held by the AFL and its rivals as job-consciousness (the AFL), and class-consciousness (organizations such as the Knights of Labor and the IWW). These philosophies resulted in oppositional alignment in regards to government.

In Taking Care of Business, Paul Buhle wrote that the AFL-affiliated United Mine Workers President John Mitchell declared in 1903, "The trade union movement in this country can make progress only by identifying itself with the state." ... [Meanwhile, the] new National Civic Federation (which was supported by the AFL) ... sought to promote labor peace (on the terms of the employers, critics claimed) and to make class consciousness and class struggle obsolete. While the AFL thus became more conservative, the IWW saw itself as a revolutionary organization dedicated to the "Abolition of the wage system."

=== Political parties and union ===
While the AFL's Mitchell and Gompers nurtured their alliance with the Democrats, the IWW changed its Constitution in 1908 to prohibit just such alliances. The 1908 Constitution states, "to the end of promoting industrial unity and of securing necessary discipline within the organization, the I. W. W. refuses all alliances, direct or indirect, with existing political parties or anti-political sects..." This language is essentially unchanged in the 2011 IWW Constitution.

The prohibition on alliances with "anti-political sects" is noteworthy. According to Verity Burgmann and others, the Chicago IWW was "non-political" rather than "anti-political." Joseph R. Conlin believes the deletion of a political clause from the Preamble in 1908 is only half the story; in 1911 the IWW rejected an amendment to the Preamble that referred to "the futility of political action." In other words, the ban on political involvement only went so far (presumably, banning any political or anti-political alliances in the name of the union), and the balance of the IWW's membership saw nothing to be gained by outright hostility toward political action.

Writing of the IWW's history through 1917, Foner (who, as a Marxist historian favored political action) noted that while most Wobblies disdained the ballot, several IWW leaders, individual members, and even entire locals did not necessarily reject politics, and some even participated in election campaigns. While offering skepticism about their accomplishing anything worthwhile, Solidarity nonetheless commented that there was room for such members in the industrial union movement, since individual members had a right to differing views. Elaborating on this circumstance, Elizabeth Gurley Flynn wrote in the Industrial Worker,

A working man may be an anarchist or a socialist, a Catholic or a Protestant, a republican or a democrat, but subscribing to the Preamble of the I.W.W. he is eligible for membership.

=== On war ===
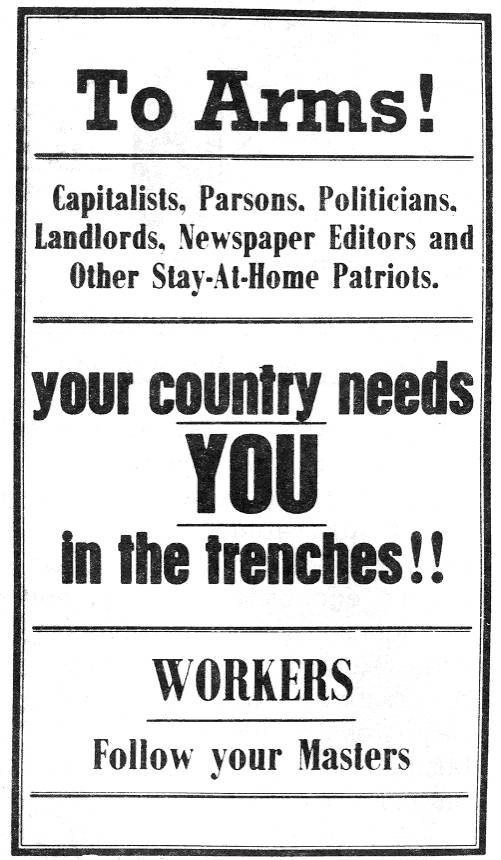
1916 IWW anti-conscription poster in Australia

While the AFL identified with, and made accommodations for the benefit of government, the IWW was ardently opposed to what it viewed as capitalist wars. World War I saw "Charles Schwab of Bethlehem Steel heralding the day when labor would rule the world and Samuel Gompers edging rapidly toward the businessman's creed of maximum production..." The IWW opposed the war effort.

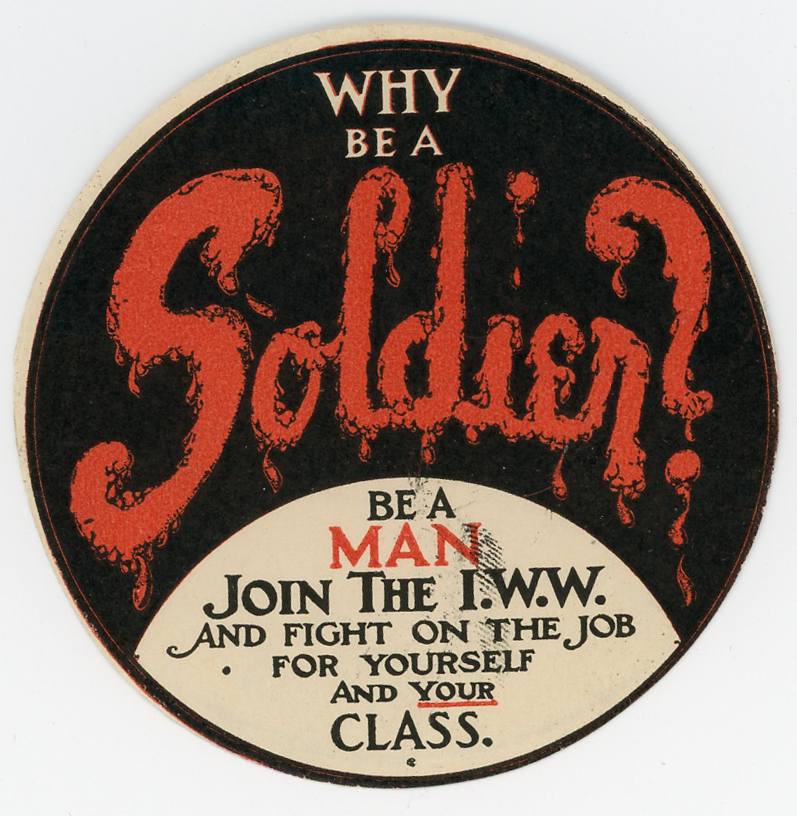
I.W.W "stickerette" - Why Be a Soldier? Be a Man.

Big Bill Haywood described in his autobiography how the IWW issued stickers, which the IWW called silent agitators, to propagandize against the war. The stickers declared, "Don't be a soldier, be a man. Join the I.W.W. and fight on the job for yourself and your class."

The IWW's opposition to the war led to enmity and, reportedly, behind the scenes attacks from the AFL's Samuel Gompers. In 1919, the year after the end of the war, the AFL seemed to have second thoughts, concluding that works committees of the war years were "a snare and a cooptation plan." Unfortunately by this time, many IWW leaders had been deported or were in prison for the IWW's anti-war pronouncements.

=== Ideology and socialism ===
Melvyn Dubofsky notes that Wobbly ideology and Socialist party doctrine both opposed capitalism and advocated something better, but beyond that, they "conflicted more than they agreed." For nearly a decade, Bill Haywood tried to bridge the gap, acting as general secretary of the IWW, and as an officer of the Socialist Party. A fractious former hard rock miner, Haywood would tease audiences by telling them, "I'm a two gun man from the West, you know." After a moment to build the suspense, he would thrust hands into pockets, extracting a red IWW card with one hand, and a red Socialist card with the other. Haywood considered both ideologies vital to the cause of changing the economic system, frequently describing Wobblyism as "socialism with its working clothes on." Yet Haywood was embraced only by the left wing of the Socialist Party, and was eventually ejected from the Socialist Party's National Executive Committee by the conservative wing.

Generally speaking, American Socialists were interested in acceptance and gradual reform. Wobblies were more cynical about capitalism, and wanted a real revolution. Dubofsky believes, however, that IWW ideology was compatible with Syndicalism.

=== To be syndicalist, or not to be syndicalist? ===
The New International Year Book for 1912 observed that,

"the Industrial Workers of the World would place an industry in the hands of its workers, as would socialism; it would organize society without any government, as would anarchism; and it would bring about a social revolution by direct action of the workers, as would syndicalism. Nevertheless, it claims to be distinct from all three."

While noting general conformance in the language of IWW and Socialist doctrines, Helen Marot clarified in 1914,

"It is the interpretation of the [IWW] preamble by individual members of the organization which has attached the Industrial Workers of the World to the Syndicalist rather than to the Socialist movement. The declaration in the manifesto that the workers should own and operate their own tools, and that they alone should enjoy the fruits of their labor, would mean, according to American Socialists, that all workers, through a political state, or regulated by it, would operate, own, and enjoy collectively all tools and the product of industry. [...] But [the Preamble], interpreted by the leaders of the Industrial Workers, is directly opposed to the political Socialism of America. It is the declaration of the Syndicalists that the new social order will not be dependent on political action or a political state, but it will be an industrial commonwealth in which all governmental functions as we know them to-day will have ceased to exist, and in which each industry will be controlled by the workers in it without external interference."

Marot further notes that such classifications (Socialist or Syndicalist) are important to theorists, but not so important to organized labor itself.

Labor historian Philip S. Foner observed in 1997 that "virtually every scholar" who has studied the IWW considers it to be a type of syndicalist organization. Yet he likewise notes key differences. For example, while European syndicalists operate within mainstream unions, the IWW has always displayed an antagonism toward, and disdain for existing craft based trade unions in the United States. This has led the IWW to embrace the concept of dual unionism. When William Z. Foster offered the IWW an opportunity to begin a European syndicalist style program of "boring from within" the AFL, the IWW rejected it. Foner concludes, therefore, that the IWW did not inherit its philosophy of revolutionary industrial unionism from French Syndicalism. However, he does also note similarities. Foner believes that IWW members did learn about the organization's kinship with European syndicalist organizations through Wobbly publications, and thereby largely accepted the doctrines of syndicalism, especially after Bill Haywood brought back some ideas about syndicalist tactics from his 1910 visit to Europe.

Conlin suggested in 1969 that those who wish to understand the true nature of the IWW should discontinue referring to the IWW as syndicalist. He makes several points: the IWW did not like the term syndicalism; the revolutionary industrial unionism of the IWW had "distinctly different origins" than did the syndicalism of Europe; and, there were key differences between the philosophy of the Wobblies, and that of the syndicalists.

Ralph Chaplin, IWW editor of Solidarity and later, of the Industrial Worker, appears to have made similar points to those made by Joseph Conlin. Chaplin wrote,

In spite of certain misleading surface similarities, which are unduly stressed by shallow observers, the European anarcho-syndicalist movement and the I.W.W. differ considerably in more than one particular. This was made inevitable by reason of the fact that the I.W.W. was the result of a later and more mature period of industrial development.

This accounts for the fact that European Syndicalism, unlike the I.W.W., is not organized into One Big Union on the basis of perfectly co-ordinated, centralized industrial departments. It also accounts for the fact that the form of the I.W.W. is designed to serve not only as a powerful combative force in the everyday class struggle, but also as the structure of the new society both as regards production and administration.

In 1981 Conlin gave up the "non-syndicalist" cause as a semantic exercise, while simultaneously complimenting Dubofsky for his superior treatment of the IWW's American roots.

=== Anarchist swing? ===
Others note that the IWW draws upon socialist and anarchist traditions. In 1921, Robert Hoxie, author of Trade Unionism in the United States, referred to the IWW as "quasi anarchistic." Just two years earlier, in 1919, Paul Frederick Brissenden described the revolutionary industrial unionism of the IWW as industrial unionism "animated and guided by the revolutionary (socialist or anarchist) spirit..."

Brissenden wrote, "The anarchistic element was weak in 1905..." Vincent St. John recalled in 1914, "there were so few anarchists in the first convention that there was very little need to classify them." But Brissenden also observed that from its inception in 1905, the IWW "began a sharp swing ... from socialist industrial unionism to anarcho-syndicalist industrial unionism." A significant milestone in this swing, in which the "anarchistic leanings of the direct-actionist wing of the organization" came to the fore, occurred when the influence of the Socialist Labor Party was purged in 1908.

=== Anarcho-syndicalism ===
Wobblies have been called socialist, anarchist, and syndicalist. Some would argue that none of these fit well. Writing of French syndicalism in The revolutionary internationals, 1864-1943, Milorad M. Drachkovitch offered the perception that,

It did not occur to the syndicalists that the capitalist state, "eliminated" by the "expropriatory general strike", would be replaced by a new state with a new ruling class—the self-taught officials of the labor unions. It was only after the Bolshevik Revolution that most French syndicalists, dropping the last vestiges of anarchist anti-statism, adopted the slogan au syndicat le pouvoir, i.e., all power to the labor union, which of course meant all power to the union leaders. Syndicalism, without the anarchist prefix, thus eventually became one of the heretical variants of Leninism.

The IWW had explicitly rejected Leninism by 1921. (Of course—perhaps unlike the French Syndicalists—the Wobbly perception of any perceived "centralizing" tactics by IWW leaders split the organization on multiple occasions...)

For those who feel compelled to "classify" the modern IWW's revolutionary industrial unionism in some broader category, the term used by Brissenden—anarcho-syndicalism—seems to be the current category of choice. However, even Brissenden's use of the term anarcho-syndicalism (in 1919) was met with dismay in some IWW circles, with a writer in One Big Union Monthly calling such terms "very misleading."

A distinction should likewise be drawn between adopting tactics or principles from the anarchists, and actually being described as an anarchist organization. The IWW,

... made a special effort to distinguish itself from the anarchists, emphasizing repeatedly that the two had "entirely different organizations and concepts of solving the social problem."

=== Contract question ===
In 1912, William E. Bohn could write in The Survey that "all those who properly call themselves industrial unionists ... refuse to bind themselves by means of contracts with their employers. Believing, as they do, that there is an inevitable and continuous struggle between employers and employed, it seems to them that a contract is a truce with their natural enemy, a truce, moreover, which gives him all the advantage." Within two decades, based upon experience with other unions whose philosophies did not preclude undercutting embattled groups of industrial workers for the sake of securing their own contract, this would no longer be the case. The CIO began organizing with a moderated form of industrial unionism (Conlin describes the CIO as composed of "nonrevolutionary" industrial unions). And by 1938, having observed the burgeoning success of the CIO, even some branches of the IWW began to sign contracts with employers.

The IWW had believed that if workers did not retain the right to strike whenever called upon, then employers could whipsaw one group of workers against another. Moreover, timed contracts allowed employers to prepare for strikes, rendering such job actions less effective. The IWW's early attitude about labor contracts had mirrored that of the Western Federation of Miners: "The WFM never demanded a closed shop or an exclusive employment contract. It supported no apprenticeship rules, having no intention of restricting union membership. It wanted jobs for all, not merely for the organized few." WFM Secretary Treasurer Bill Haywood believed that in time of crisis the AFL "had always proved impotent to aid its affiliates, usually sacrificing them on the 'sacred altar of contract'." This view was shared by WFM President Charles Moyer, who told the 1903 WFM Convention, "It behooves us at all times to be free to take advantage of any opportunity to better our condition. Nothing affords the majority of corporations more satisfaction than to realize that they have placed you in a position where you are powerless to act for a period of years." According to Historian Melvyn Dubofsky, neither the WFM nor its successive offspring—the American Labor Union (ALU) and the IWW—accepted that a contract with employers was legally or morally binding, and all three organizations believed that workers could best see to their interests by retaining the ability to strike when necessary.

However, employers used the no contract manifesto as an excuse not to meet with workers. Local media supported the employers, asking, what was the use of discussing grievances with members of an organization that refused a written agreement, if the workers were free to strike again the moment a dispute was settled? This became a familiar circumstance, and as a result, other unions were sometimes able to sign members that had once marched under the banner of the IWW.

From the Paterson strike until the rise of the Agricultural Workers Organization (AWO) in 1915, the IWW had organized successfully during labor struggles, but then had failed to hold its membership. As James P. Cannon would later write,

... the IWW attracted a remarkable selection of young revolutionary militants to its banner. As a union, the organization led many strikes which swelled the membership momentarily. But after the strikes were over, whether won or lost, stable union organization was not maintained. After every strike, the membership settled down again to the die-hard cadre united on principle.

This circumstance prompted a discussion in the IWW press of the question, "What's wrong with the IWW?"

The job delegate system of the AWO proved successful and, for a time, allowed the IWW to ignore the problem of failing to retain members. Rather than soap boxing to sign up workers between jobs, carefully chosen union members with card kits were sent into the fields to sign up others on the job. The results were a considerable improvement. Between 1915 and 1917, the IWW's Agricultural Workers Organization (AWO) organized more than a hundred thousand migratory farm workers throughout the midwest and western United States. IWW members were routinely blacklisted from farm worker employment offices, prompting the IWW to advise job delegates to tear up their personal IWW cards in front of the boss to hold onto their own job. The AWO office would later provide a duplicate card. But signing up significant numbers of workers only eased, and did not in any way solve the problem of membership losses resulting from the no contract philosophy.

The question of contract became an important factor that tended to divide members of the IWW from their leaders. The two principles of fighting for better wages, hours and conditions, and preparing for the ultimate triumph of labor often came into conflict. IWW members frequently chose the former, while their leadership often saw the latter principle as predominant. As Philip Foner put it, activities that were logical and necessary on the trade union front frequently had to be rejected because they conflicted with revolutionary aims.

In Oil, Wheat & Wobblies, a book about the Industrial Workers of the World in Oklahoma, Nigel Anthony Sellars wrote that although the CIO "inherited the egalitarian traditions and syndicalist ideals" of the IWW, the CIO succeeded where the IWW had failed (in mass organizing of industrial unions) "in part because the newer organization did not repeat the Wobblies' mistakes, such as refusing to sign time contracts and rejecting political action." The IWW view of political action has not been much affected by such analysis. However, in the period of the CIO's impressive ascent, the IWW philosophy about contracts was beginning to evolve. In military terms, the contract eventually came to be viewed somewhat as the role of the infantry, in that ground captured must in some fashion become ground held.

There are two aspects of the contract question: official recognition of the union by the employer, and the labor contract itself. During its early years, the IWW rejected both. Foner observed that the larger, stronger IWW locals were able to live with this circumstance, for they achieved recognition by force of numbers. However, weak IWW unions lost job control because hostile employers were not bound by contractual recognition, and the companies therefore resorted to hiring workers who were not IWW members. Conlin observed, "[t]he issues of time contracts and union recognition proved to be the Wobblies' Achilles' heel every time they organized a successful strike." Foner concludes that, "ironically, while the refusal to sign contracts was justified, in part, as a means of keeping the capitalists off balance, experience proved that it had the opposite effect of enabling the employers to use it to their own advantage."

One example of membership loss and acquisition relating to the contract occurred in the Baltimore garment industry. By September 1913 the IWW had organized some of the largest garment shops in the city. During a fourteen-week strike, the IWW was undercut when the conservative AFL-affiliated United Garment Workers (UGW) brought in scab replacement workers. Shortly afterward, at their 1914 Nashville convention, a group of disenchanted UGW unionists split off to form the Amalgamated Clothing Workers (ACW). The IWW was initially the largest of these three organizations in Baltimore. Yet in the three-way free-for-all that occurred there in 1916—a struggle characterized by union scabbing and threats—the IWW lost all of its membership in the district as a result of the other two unions bidding against each other for collective bargaining agreements.

Meanwhile, IWW local unions that did sign contracts had their charters pulled. That was the fate of an IWW branch in Great Falls, Montana, in 1912. Other local organizations were forced to disaffiliate from the IWW, as did the Metal and Machinery Workers Industrial Union No. 440 in Cleveland, Ohio during the 1930s, when they elected to sign a contract with an employer.

During the 1927 coal strike in Colorado, a challenge to the policy of refusing union recognition came from within the IWW, when IWW organizer Tom Conners replaced A. S. Embree, who had been jailed for violating the state's anti-picketing policy. After a very successful strike that depleted the state's coal reserves, Conners foresaw the possibility of the State Industrial Commission recognizing the IWW. Conlin indicates that this was the first time such a challenge to the IWW's policy of "no contracts, no recognition" had been made from within. However, Embree and his followers opposed the move, and nothing came of it. While the miners gained from the strike, the IWW failed to do so.

In 1938, the IWW Constitution was amended to allow industrial unions to adopt their own rules concerning contractual agreements. A stipulation adopted in 1946 required that no such agreement could allow workers to engage in work that would undermine any strike.

Staughton Lynd, a labor attorney, activist, and author of Solidarity Unionism, has observed,

[T]he critical question is not whether or not to have a contract. The critical question is what is in the contract. Ninety-nine percent of AFL–CIO contracts contain a no-strike clause, whereby labor gives up its self-activity, and a management prerogative clause, whereby management retains its ability to act unilaterally, for instance in closing plants. No contract is better than such a contract.

==== No-strike clause ====
Contracts enforce "labor peace" through a clause that prohibits strikes for the duration of the contract. Some unions agree to a no-strike clause in exchange for a grievance arbitration provision, or some similar concession. Not all labor contracts have no-strike clauses. On some occasions, no-strike clauses have become a contract issue in dispute, with workers refusing to accept the no-strike clause, and employers refusing to agree to a contract without one.

In 2005, Staughton Lynd discussed the historical and legal circumstances relating to the no-strike clause at the IWW's centenary in Chicago, Illinois:

When John L. Lewis, Philip Murray, and other men of power in the new CIO negotiated the first contracts for auto workers and steelworkers, these contracts, even if only a few pages long, typically contained a no-strike clause. All workers in a given workplace were now prohibited from striking as particular crafts had been before. This remains the situation today.

Nothing in labor law required a no-strike clause. Indeed, the drafters of the original National Labor Relations Act (or Wagner Act) went out of their way to ensure that the law would not be used to curtail the right to strike. Not only does federal labor law affirm the right "to engage in . . . concerted activities for the purpose of . . . mutual aid or protection"; even as amended by the Taft–Hartley Act of 1947, Section 502 of what is now called the Labor Management Relations Act declares:

Nothing in this Act shall be construed to require an individual employee to render labor or service without his consent, nor shall anything in this Act be construed to make the quitting of his labor by an individual employee an illegal act; nor shall any court issue any process to compel the performance by an individual employee of such labor or service, without his consent; nor shall the quitting of work by an employee or employees in good faith because of abnormally dangerous conditions for work at the place of employment of such employee or employees be deemed a strike under this chapter[;]

and for good measure, the drafters added in Section 13 of the NLRA, now section 163 of the LMRA: "Nothing in this Act, except as specifically provided for herein, shall be construed so as either to interfere with or impede or diminish in any way the right to strike."

While the NLRA protects the right to strike, some strikes do not have legal protection. For example, "[i]f a collective bargaining agreement contains a no-strike clause (the union agrees not to go on strike while the contract is in effect), a strike during the life of the contract would not be protected. The strikers could be fired." Some no-strike clauses, however, have qualifications which protect the workers, for example, if they refuse to perform assigned work that has been struck by other workers.

== Tactics and action ==
=== Direct action ===
The Industrial Workers of the World inherited the concept of economic action (as opposed to political action), in part, from the American Labor Union. Melvyn Dubofsky associates economic action with what the IWW would later call direct action. The IWW first mentioned the term "direct action" in a Wobbly publication in reference to a Chicago strike conducted in 1910. In this instance the specific methods of direct action are not recorded, but the account referred to a successful strike against Hansel & Elcock Construction which was followed by former strikers persuading former strike breakers to "dismiss themselves" from the job.

Direct action in the labor movement initially referred to the actions taken by workers for themselves, as opposed to actions taken in their name by legislative or other representatives. For example, dual-card IWW members have been known to advocate direct action on the shop floor to force employers to provide safer working conditions, to be more responsive to workers' demands, and to avoid speedup situations. However, the expression has sometimes "been contorted to cover all the implications of mayhem and destruction..." Some of the confusion may result from varying definitions offered by different Wobbly publications. The Industrial Worker described direct action as "any effort made directly for the purpose of getting more of the goods from the boss." The eastern U.S. IWW publication Solidarity defined direct action as "dealing directly with the boss through your labor union. The strike in its different forms, is the best known example of 'direct action'."

==== Soapboxing and free speech fights ====
Although lauded by civil libertarians as an important part of the struggles for civil and constitutional rights, the IWW's free speech fights were carried out for more concrete goals. If they weren't allowed to talk to workers, they wouldn't be able to organize workers. Wobbly activists simultaneously demonstrated that direct action works, and that it was possible for members of the lower strata of society to challenge authority and, through determination and perseverance, to frequently win.

The workers and the IWW had a common enemy in the communities that became free speech battlegrounds. These were the job sharks, agencies that controlled employment in agriculture and the timber industry. The combination of sharks, anti-union employers, and hostile or indifferent communities kept wages low, and employment uncertain for many workers.

The attitude in some communities toward IWW members engaging in the fight for free speech is nicely characterized by an editorial in the San Diego Evening Tribune on March 4, 1912:

Hanging is none too good for them and they would be much better dead, for they are absolutely useless in the human economy. They are the waste material of creation and they should be drained off into the sewer of oblivion, there to rot in cold obstruction like any other excrement.

The strategy of the IWW during free speech fights was to put out a call for "footloose" workers to come to the community, and to challenge a no speaking ordinance simply by violating it. Wobblies would talk about the job, the unfairness of the system, or would simply read the Declaration of Independence, or the Bill of Rights to the U.S. Constitution. In violation of the law, they would get arrested. By filling the jails with workers, the IWW was able to put pressure on the community's taxpayers, who ultimately had to pay the bill for feeding and housing the prisoners. The taxpayers presumably had the power to avoid such expenses by forcing the local administration to change its policies, or to overturn the ordinance itself.

==== Conventional strikes ====
A primary goal of unions is to improve the wages, hours, and working conditions of working people, and the strike, or threat of a strike is one mechanism by which that can be accomplished. However, the IWW also believe that the strike is a means by which working people can educate themselves to the issues of class struggle. Such education, according to the Wobblies, is necessary training in the effort to properly exercise the general strike, which (according to IWW theory) is the best means by which to establish an industrial democracy.

The IWW has engaged in numerous strikes throughout its history. During the Colorado coal strike of 1927, IWW organizers had applied many of the strategies and tactics they'd adopted during previous decades.

===== Colorado Coal Strike (A Case Study) =====
Joseph Conlin has written that the 1927 coal strike was a "unique, indeed critical event in the social and economic history of the West." First, it was a coal strike run by Wobblies, rather than the United Mine Workers. Second, many of the miners had a company union, yet still elected to strike under the IWW. Third, it had the first positive result for Colorado coal miners in sixty years of struggle.

The IWW had editorially criticized the leadership of the United Mine Workers (UMW) during the 1913-14 strike which had led to the Ludlow Massacre. Their view: the miners had been "sold out" by "politicians" who had timidly refused to employ the full power of an aroused working class. The United Mine Workers responded by banning IWW card holders from membership in the UMW. Because the United Mine Workers had essentially left Colorado in defeat a decade earlier, the IWW began organizing Colorado coal miners in 1925. Organizer Frank Jurich was joined by A.S. Embree, a popular and very capable IWW organizer. Embree had just come from prison, having been incarcerated on syndicalist charges. While in prison, Embree indicated his dedication to the cause. He had written, "The end in view [the revolution] is well worth striving for, but in the struggle itself lies the happiness of the fighter." Embree initially began organizing outlying camps to avoid company opposition.

In 1927 the IWW called for a three-day nationwide walkout to protest the execution of Sacco and Vanzetti. While the United Mine Workers predicted the IWW's walkout would fail in Colorado, Sheriff Harry Capps of Huerfano County commented that "fully two-thirds of the miners in the [Walsenburg] district [are] members of the I.W.W." When the walkout occurred, out of a total 1,167 miners, 1,132 stayed off the job, and only 35 went to work. Under threat of injunction, the IWW leaders felt they'd demonstrated success, and they persuaded the miners to return to work one day early. Conlin wrote, "The tactical decision of the Wobblies was to give ground on this occasion to intensify organizing efforts for a statewide strike."

Organizing proceeded apace. In one mine, the Supervisor went to work one morning and discovered "Wobbly stickers pasted on every timber and cross beam in the place: 'Join the Wobblies, Join the Wobblies.'" There were IWW posters "from the bottom of the shaft clear to the working face."

IWW leader Kristin Svanum met in a mass meeting with 187 delegates from 43 of the state's 125 mines to work out the miners' demands. Industrial Solidarity declared, "These mass meetings [are] to be the legislative bodies of the strikers." The rank and file miners were given full veto power over every aspect of the pending strike. The miners elected a General Strike Committee, which had the power to appoint all other committees, with only miners eligible for committee membership—a policy that demonstrated "the democratic principles of the Wobblies." While Wobbly organizers conducted the meetings, they had no vote in the miners' decisions. The Wobblies were careful that the strike demands reflected only the immediate needs of the workers, rather than long range goals of the IWW. IWW philosophy and economic analysis were communicated only passively through the printing of the union's Preamble on membership cards, on leaflets, and in personal conversations with organizers drawn from the rank and file. For a long time, the Wobbly philosophy was based on the belief that organizing and developing solidarity constituted the best radical education for workers. The perceptions expressed in the IWW Preamble coincided with the Colorado miners' personal experiences with capitalism, and also with their feelings about the United Mine Workers union which since 1914 had seemed to ignore their needs.

All national groupings were represented on the General Strike Committee—"Mexican, Slav, Spanish, Greek, Anglo, Italian, and Negro."

There were so many different nationalities in the coal towns of Colorado due to corporate recruitment policy. After the coal strike of 1903–04, the companies intentionally recruited replacement miners who would have social, cultural, and language barriers to overcome before they could unite with other miners to form unions. But the IWW, always the champion of the immigrant and the ethnic worker, had readily overcome such challenges as early as the 1912 Lawrence Textile Strike.

Docile immigrant workers may have been a boon to industry, but invariably, such workers were ruthlessly exploited. In the mines, a worker who newly arrived, would often become a militant unionist.

Immigrants aroused by injustice became targets. The Colorado newspapers railed against foreign workers and, alternately, an alleged foreign, or a lower class philosophy. For example, IWW leaders were called "tramps with their pants pressed." The Denver Morning Post criticized the strikers' spelling, their speech, their dress, their personal hygiene, and their values. The IWW responded by promoting international and ethnic solidarity. Organizers with Spanish surnames played a vital role. The more loudly the coal operators objected, the quicker the Wobbly message circulated.

The IWW was careful to follow the minutiae of Colorado law related to the pending strike, in an effort to keep the focus on the miners, rather than on the IWW itself. Nonetheless, the State Industrial Commission declared the pending strike illegal. This decision angered even established labor organizations who had not supported the strike up to that point. They considered it an affront to all of organized labor in Colorado.

IWW organizers were arrested, beaten, and robbed. Proclamations were passed by at least six city councils ordering the IWW to leave. IWW union halls were wrecked. Strike preparations proceeded unabated, and strike votes were held throughout the state. In Lafayette, so many people arrived at the meeting hall to endorse the pending strike that the vote was moved to the football field, and conducted under the headlights of trucks. The Denver Post estimated that 4,000 attended.

Along with the coal companies, the state, and many local communities, the United Mine Workers came out publicly against the pending strike. But the strike was called in spite of the opposition, and miners walked. After two weeks of the Wobbly led strike, 113 Colorado coal mines had closed, and just 12 mines remained open. Joseph Conlin declared it the most successful strike in Colorado's history. The coal companies offered a non-negotiated pay increase of sixty-eight cents per day. This offer did not disrupt the strikers' motivation.

With IWW guidance, the General Strike Committee instructed the miners to commit no violence. The strike saw auto caravans of five hundred strikers traveling in more than a hundred vehicles, touring struck communities to dispense donated food and other provisions. This not only spread the strike, it kept up the strikers' morale. All participants were searched by their leaders for liquor or firearms before each activity.

Conlin quotes McClurg to observe that "Laws were broken, but selectively and with care." The state of Colorado banned picketing, but miners voted in mass meetings to ignore the state's ban. Colorado law outlawed red flags such as those long flown by the IWW, so the strikers carried American flags. In a further declaration of non-violent intent, the IWW admonished strikers, "If anyone is going to be killed, let it be one of our men first."

The Columbine mine, one of the larger of the few mines still working, granted a fifty cent per day pay raise. The IWW saw this as one major coal company weakening, but announced that it was not enough. The Wobblies organized massive marches to the Columbine, numbering from 500 to 1,200 miners plus their families. They sometimes brought a five-piece brass band, and they sang union songs, satirizing the company and the police.

In one surprising episode of "philosophical warfare" during the strike, the IWW made an attempt to establish a workers' cooperative for striking miners at an abandoned mine. Two coal mine operators sought to demonstrate that such cooperatives were impossible, and they issued a challenge to the IWW to follow through at their facilities. However, they insisted that the IWW had to post a state-required safety bond within 24 hours, before it could reopen the mines. Since the IWW wasn't able to post the bond within the designated period, the experiment was not pursued.

Entire communities became organized during the 1927 strike, and they were capable of protracted militant action. However, a strike typically puts a dramatic strain on relationships within communities. Affected relationships are not just between strikers and business interests, or between strikers and non-strikers. During a coal strike, entire families are involved. One resident of a coal community spoke of the effect of the 1927 strike on students,

You'd think the coal miner was the dirtiest reptile that walked the earth. Everybody was down on the coal miner when he went on strike ... And the teachers were against us. And they had their favorites. The scabs' boys were in there too and, of course, we had gangs just like they do today. And the teachers would side with the scabs' side. Why hells bells man, we had to do something! So we organized (Junior Wobblies) at school just to protect ourselves.

The State of Colorado and local law enforcement began to arrest every strike leader that they could identify, on vagrancy or other trumped up charges. Many were deported from the state. In Trinidad, in Walsenberg, and elsewhere, members of strikers' families stepped forward to take the place of arrested leaders, and lead the strike.

Seventy-five IWW members in the Trinidad jail conducted protests that featured bonfires. Prisoners in the Lafayette jail carried on incessant singing. When they were offered their freedom, they refused to leave. A group of prisoners in Erie persuaded their jailers that deputies in Utah and Wyoming received higher pay, had better working conditions, and worked shorter hours. In Pueblo, the jail was secured by "200 deputies armed with tear bombs, machine guns, rifles, and fire engine pumpers."

Newspapers began calling for the governor to no longer withhold the "mailed fist", to strike hard and strike swiftly, and for "Machine Guns Manned By Willing Shooters" at more of the state's coal mines. Within days, state police and mine guards fired machine guns, rifles, and pistols against 500 unarmed miners and their wives at the Columbine mine, killing six. Now faced with their own massacre, the IWW's leaders kept their focus on the immediate goal: winning the strike. After the memorial services, when some angry miners talked about getting their guns, organizers counseled them with the words of Joe Hill: "don't mourn, organize!"

The miners won a dollar a day increase from the 1927 strike. The miners in the northern field won union recognition from the second largest coal operator in Colorado. It was not recognition of the IWW, as it turned out. The company picked a union for the miners, and it was the United Mine Workers. Nonetheless, these were the most substantial gains the miners had ever achieved from a strike in Colorado. It was the only increase obtained by coal miners in the country during the period from 1928 to 1930.

Although the United Mine Workers in Colorado had vocally opposed the strike, they had established an official position of neutrality. However, United Mine Workers agents conducted overt actions against the strikers, including participation in vigilante raids against IWW property. Some UMW miners scabbed on the IWW strike, and others became informants for the state police. One popular United Mine Workers official, a union organizer from the Ludlow era by the name of Mike Livoda, hired himself out to the governor to spy on the Wobblies.

The most pervasive spying during the 1927 strike was most probably conducted by Colorado Fuel and Iron, the coal and steel company owned by the Rockefeller dynasty. The company organized a network of spies to infiltrate, propagandize against, and disrupt the IWW. Archives currently held at the Bessemer Historical Society reveal that the company used its spies and its relationship with the authorities to compile dossiers on union activists, and to obtain photographs, IWW membership lists, private union correspondence, and other union materials related to the strike.

Summing up the Colorado coal strike, Joseph Conlin concludes that Colorado coal miners were radical, based upon their experiences, and willfully chose to have the IWW lead them. In Conlin's words, "[t]he failure of the Wobblies to establish and maintain a viable organization in Colorado resulted from the anarcho-syndicalist strategy of the IWW (i.e., no labor contracts, no union recognition), not from the absence of class consciousness and radicalism among the miners."

==== Intermittent and short strikes ====
Vincent St. John, theorist and leader of the Industrial Workers of the World, wrote in 1917,

A long drawn out strike implies insufficient organization or that the strike has occurred at a time when the employer can best afford a shut down—or both. Under all ordinary circumstances a strike that is not won in four to six weeks cannot be won by remaining out longer. In trustified industry the employer can better afford to fight one strike that lasts six months than he can six strikes that take place in that period.

Strikes are to be called "when the employers can least afford a cessation of work—during the busy season and when there are rush orders to be filled." If a strike does not succeed, St. John advises, then the employees go back to work and continue to conduct a job action while on the job. (See Strike on the job, below.) St. John envisioned that strike breakers could be isolated by the union. "Interference by the government is resented by open violation of the government's orders, [and] going to jail en masse..."

==== Sit-down strikes ====
When workers conduct a sit-down strike, they take possession of the workplace by "sitting down" at their work stations, preventing the employer from replacing them with strikebreakers, or moving production to other locations.

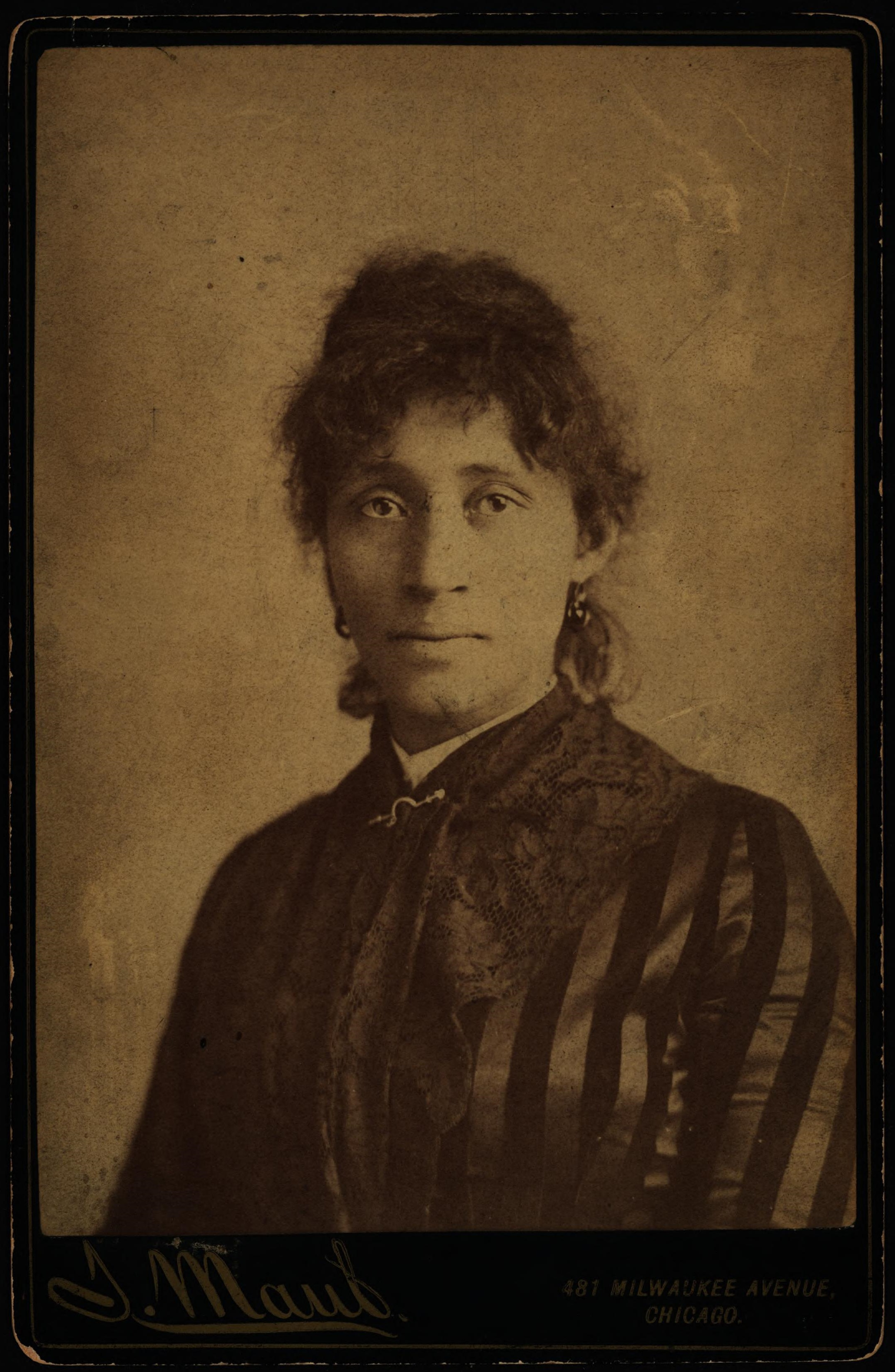
Lucy Parsons

Lucy Parsons, whose husband was executed in the aftermath of the Haymarket affair, advocated the sit-down strike in her speech at the IWW's Founding Convention. She commented, "My conception of the strike of the future is not to strike and go out and starve but to strike and remain in and take possession of the necessary property of production." Just over a year later, the IWW initiated the first sit-down strike in American history on December 10, 1906, at the General Electric Works in Schenectady, New York, when 3,000 workers sat down on the job and stopped production to protest the dismissal of three union members. The strikers were persuaded to use "syndicalistic tactics which [were] strongly advocated" in IWW literature. IWW sources reported that the AFL attacked the IWW in the local press over the strike. The AFL required its affiliates not to honor the strike, on pain of losing their charter.

The sit-down strike is similar to the sit-in protest, which was used in India during the struggle against British rule, following the experiences of Mohandas Gandhi in South Africa.

According to Philip Taft and Philip Ross, U.S. workers who participate in a sit-down strike lose their legal right to recall, based upon a decision by the U.S. Supreme Court.

==== Boycotts ====
Although the IWW pioneered the economic boycott, The New York Tribune suggested that the IWW was a German front, responsible for acts of sabotage throughout the nation. The IWW did not use the boycott frequently in its early days, primarily because IWW members were frequently not consumers of the products which might be boycotted. However, the organization did believe that the boycott could be an effective weapon in some situations.

During the 1912 textile strike in Lawrence, Massachusetts, the IWW boycotted merchants on Essex Street who were opposed to the strikers. The boycott was successful.

In 1923, a boycott "of all California products in ship's stores" was threatened in an effort to have the Criminal Syndicalist Law repealed. The threat, carried out in conjunction with a general strike on the Los Angeles and San Francisco waterfronts, was successful in shutting down the harbors.

==== General strike ====
According to a pamphlet produced by the Industrial Workers of the World,

A general strike is a strike involving workers across multiple trades or industries that involves enough workers to cause serious economic disruption.

In essence, a general strike is the complete and total shutdown of the economy. A general strike can last for a day, a week, or longer depending on the severity of the crisis, the resolve of the strikers, and the extent of public solidarity. During the strike, large numbers of workers in many industries (excluding employees of crucial services, such as emergency/medical) will stop working and no money or labor is exchanged. All decisions regarding the length of the strike, the groups of workers who continue working, and demands of the strikers are decided by a strike committee.

Bill Haywood believed that industrial unionism made possible the general strike, and the general strike made possible industrial democracy. In a 1911 speech in New York City, Haywood explained his view of the economic situation, and why he believed a general strike was justified,

The capitalists have wealth; they have money. They invest the money in machinery, in the resources of the earth. They operate a factory, a mine, a railroad, a mill. They will keep that factory running just as long as there are profits coming in. When anything happens to disturb the profits, what do the capitalists do? They go on strike, don't they? They withdraw their finances from that particular mill. They close it down because there are no profits to be made there. They don't care what becomes of the working class. But the working class, on the other hand, has always been taught to take care of the capitalist's interest in the property.

Haywood acknowledged three different levels of general strike:

- general strike in an industry;
- general strike in a community;
- general national strike.

The ultimate goal of the general strike, according to the Industrial Workers of the World, is to displace capitalists and give control over the means of production to workers. Foner notes that the first person recorded mentioning the general strike as a weapon for the IWW was Lucy Parsons. The concept didn't receive much attention from the Wobbly press until 1910, and especially 1911.

===== Industrial democracy =====
According to Wobbly theory, the conventional strike is an important (but not the only) weapon for improving wages, hours, and working conditions for working people. These strikes are also good training to help workers educate themselves about the class struggle, and about what it will take to execute an eventual general strike for the purpose of achieving industrial democracy. During the final general strike, workers would not walk out of their shops, factories, mines, and mills, but would rather occupy their workplaces and take them over. Prior to taking action to initiate industrial democracy, workers would need to educate themselves with technical and managerial knowledge in order to operate industry.

According to Foner, the Wobbly conception of industrial democracy is intentionally not presented in detail by IWW theorists; in that sense, the details are left to the "future development of society." However, certain concepts are implicit. Industrial democracy will be "a new society [built] within the shell of the old." Members of the industrial union educate themselves to operate industry according to democratic principles, and without the current hierarchical ownership/management structure. Issues such as production and distribution would be managed by the workers themselves.

==== Strike on the job ====
A "strike on the job" was often called when a conventional strike seemed likely to lose. When some Wobblies were fired for exercising a strike on the job, they would move to a different job, unafraid to repeat the tactic as needed. (See Silent strike, slowdown, exceptional obedience (work to rule), below.)

==== Silent strike, slowdown and exceptional obedience (work to rule) ====
Several labor historians have used the expression "silent strike" to identify one strike tactic among many ascribed to the IWW. However, it doesn't appear that the Industrial Workers of the World often used the expression "silent strike." One exception was a 1911 report from Frank Little to the Industrial Worker on his time working with California farmworkers. "We have the silent strike on. ... The slave drivers are wild—the slaves won't work as hard as they want them to."

A definition of silent strike is offered in a book about the Filipino sugar strike of 1924–1925:

Employees who do not receive the wages demanded will go on a silent strike, staying on the job, but doing only enough work to earn the wages they receive.

According to the book, no IWW organizers were involved in a strike that erupted into a gunbattle, but the Honolulu Star-Bulletin blamed the IWW for the labor unrest anyway.

The Harvard Monthly of 1913 offers a more embellished definition,

In case of failure to achieve any gains by a strike, the worker resorts to sabotage, the silent strike by which are gained all the advantages of the open strike without its dangers; i.e., the men keep their places at their machines, thus preventing and making unnecessary the employment of scabs, pretending to do the work for which they receive their pay, but actually doing only so much of it as is needed to deceive the overseers. At the same time the worker employs many methods of attacking the employer, such as breaking delicate parts of machinery, mixing wrong ingredients into compounds, telling truth or lies to customers, anything, in short, to force the employer to terms.

It is useless to assert that these methods will not appeal to AngloSaxon workers, as does one writer on the subject. Certainly sabotage is not "fair-play," but neither is in the eyes of the laborer, the condition which forces him to it.

The terms "exceptional obedience" and "work to rule" appear to be modern variations of a similar expression frequently used by the Wobblies—"striking on the job." This tactic went by other names (and descriptions) as well. In her introduction of the 1916 pamphlet "Sabotage", Elizabeth Gurley Flynn observed that "sabotage [is] an instinctive defense [that] existed long before it was ever officially recognized by any labor organization. Sabotage means primarily: the withdrawal of efficiency." (See Sabotage section, below.)

Because the IWW gave vocal support to sabotage during the period after 1910 (usually accompanied by an advisory against violence)—frequently explained as anything from conscious withdrawal of efficiency to more definite measures—the definitions tend to be vague. A common Wobbly expression such as "fix the job" might mean a slowdown, a work stoppage, or something more.

Dubofsky writes that the "on the job strike [is] essentially a form of non-violent sabotage", and that,

Sometimes, it was claimed, the workers could even effect sabotage through exceptional obedience: Williams and Haywood were fond of noting that Italian and French workers had on occasion tied up the national railroads simply by observing every operating rule in their work regulations.

The IWW withdrew the "official" status of Flynn's sabotage pamphlet, but it is still in circulation. In 1919 the IWW likewise advised its membership that the broad IWW definition of sabotage, essentially covering a range of activities from slacking on the job to disabling equipment, had become so distorted toward the latter (in the IWW's view) that the use of the word had become more trouble than it was worth (See Sabotage section, below).

While the IWW pioneered many of these concepts, they have since been adopted and advocated by others. For example, in A Troublemaker's Handbook 2, Aaron Brenner has written,

Workers have the power to inflict economic damage on a company without going on strike. They can use this power to extract concessions at the bargaining table by disrupting production, undermining management control on the shop floor, and hurting the company's profits—while still on the job. Such "inside strategies" are not easy, but they can be better than walking out, especially when the company is prepared for a strike.

The Troublemaker's Handbook discusses some legal aspects of "inside strategies", including the fact that legality may depend, in part, upon the reasons offered for a work to rule campaign. The modern IWW likewise offers disclaimers on its website when introducing historical documents related to sabotage, for example,

[excerpt] The IWW takes no official position on sabotage (i.e., the IWW neither condones nor condemns such actions). Workers who engage in some ... forms of sabotage risk legal sanctions.

==== Sabotage ====
When disgruntled workers damage or destroy equipment or interfere with the smooth running of a workplace, it is called workplace sabotage. While Luddites sought to "turn back the clock" to an era before the introduction of workplace machinery, radical labor unions such as the Industrial Workers of the World (IWW) have advocated sabotage as a tactical means of self-defense against unfair working conditions.

The first references to the terms "sabotage" and "passive resistance" in the IWW press appeared in approximately 1910. These terms were used in connection with a strike against a Chicago clothing company called Lamm & Co. and the connotation of sabotage in that job action referred to "malingering or inefficient work."

The IWW was shaped in part by the industrial unionism philosophy of Big Bill Haywood, and in 1910 Haywood was exposed to sabotage while touring Europe:

The experience that had the most lasting impact on Haywood was witnessing a general strike on the French railroads. Tired of waiting for parliament to act on their demands, railroad workers walked off their jobs all across the country. The French government responded by drafting the strikers into the army and then ordering them back to work. Undaunted, the workers carried their strike to the job. Suddenly, they could not seem to do anything right. Perishables sat for weeks, sidetracked and forgotten. Freight bound for Paris was misdirected to Lyon or Marseille instead. This tactic—the French called it "sabotage"—won the strikers their demands and impressed Bill Haywood.

For the IWW, sabotage came to mean any withdrawal of efficiency—including the slowdown, the strike, or creative bungling of job assignments.

The IWW black cat is adopted as a symbol by anarcho-syndicalists

Ralph Chaplin, an IWW artist and poet, drew the IWW's image of a black cat with flashing teeth and bared claws as a symbol of the IWW's concept of sabotage. In testimony before the court in a 1918 trial of IWW leaders, Chaplin stated that the black cat "was commonly used by the boys as representing the idea of sabotage. The idea being to frighten the employer by the mention of the name sabotage, or by putting a black cat somewhere around. You know if you saw a black cat go across your path you would think, if you were superstitious, you are going to have a little bad luck. The idea of sabotage is to use a little black cat on the boss."

Historically the IWW was accused of outright damage to property—for example, getting the blame for causing wheat field fires in a book of fiction by Zane Grey, published in 1919 at the height of the red scare. The extent to which the IWW actually practiced sabotage, other than through their "withdrawal of efficiency," is open to dispute. IWW organizers often counseled workers to avoid any actions that would hurt their own job prospects. Even so, when the term "sabotage" is applied to workers, it is frequently interpreted to mean actual destruction. A study by Johns Hopkins University in 1939 determined,

Although there are contradictory opinions as to whether the IWW practices sabotage or not, it is interesting to note that no case of an IWW saboteur caught practicing sabotage or convicted of its practice is available.

Melvyn Dubofsky has written, "...hard as they tried, state and federal authorities could never establish legal proof of IWW-instigated sabotage. Rudolph Katz ... was perhaps close to the truth when he informed federal investigators, 'The American Federation of Labor does not preach sabotage, but it practices sabotage; and the I.W.W. preaches sabotage, but does not practice it.'"

Conlin seems not to accept the implied Wobbly innocence on the charge of sabotage. Rather, he puts any possible transgressions into a different perspective, writing (in 1969) that in the aftermath of the anti-war crackdown,

The I.W.W.'s actual culpability of wheatfield fires and sawmill wreckings had become unimportant because of the government's greater offenses.

In 1918, sedition and anti-sabotage laws were passed in the United States. The general executive board of the IWW issued a statement referring to the anti-sabotage law, which concluded:

The membership will find it to their advantage to forget and drop the word. The word itself is not worth it. It may arise again in the future in its true light and in its true meaning. If so, the future will care for itself. We should be and are too busy building the One Big Union to argue with Congress or departments of justice as to the real meaning of a poor French word.

Robert Hoxie, whose work was collected in the 1921 publication Trade Unionism in the United States, was one of the foremost experts on the trade union movement in the early twentieth century. Hoxie considered the Industrial Workers of the World the "most clear representative" of revolutionary unionism in the United States. In his discussion of the IWW, he explained the nature of sabotage in detail that is worth quoting at length:

Sabotage is an elusive phenomena and is difficult of accurate definition. Briefly described it is called "striking on the job." J. A. Estey, in his "Revolutionary Unionism," does well when he says: "In Syndicalist practice it [sabotage] is a comprehensive term, covering every process by which the laborer, while remaining at work, tries to damage the interests of his employer, whether by simple malingering, or by bad quality of work, or by doing actual damage to tools and machinery" (p. 96). This definition puts admirably the essential, underlying characteristics of sabotage, but in practice it ranges even beyond such limits. There are almost an indefinite number of ways of "putting the boots to the employer" which have come to properly be included under the general designation, and some of them have been employed by conservative unionists time out of mind. Ca' Canny or soldiering is one of them, which was a practice long before revolutionary unionism was known to the mass of workers. In essence it is practiced by every union that sets a limitation on output. Living strictly up to impossible safety rules enacted by the employers for their own protection is another method. Wasting materials, turning out goods of inferior quality or damaging them in the process, misdirecting shipments, telling the truth about the quality of products, changing price cards, sanding the bearings, salting the soup and the sheets, "throwing the monkey wrench into the machinery"—all are methods of practicing sabotage that have become familiar.

==== Violence ====
A study in 1969 concluded that "IWW activity was virtually free of violence." However, it was not uncommon for violence to be called for, and used against IWW organizers and members. In 1917, for example, popular organizer Frank Little, an officer of the IWW's General Executive Board, was hanged from a Butte, Montana railroad trestle, a victim of vigilante justice. And during the 1927 coal strike in Colorado, the Denver Morning Post editorialized that if the Wobblies picketed again, then it was time for the governor to stop withholding the "mailed fist", and to strike hard and strike swiftly against them. Two weeks later, the Boulder Daily Camera editorialized that "machine guns manned by willing shooters are wanted" at Colorado coal mines. The following week, striking miners were machine gunned by the state, and six died. Conlin has asserted that "few organizations in American history of any stripe have experienced repression so cynical as did the I.W.W."

In a few cases, violence was met with violence. Who was at fault, and who initiated the attack, have been historical questions debated to the present day in both the Everett massacre and the Centralia massacre, although a study by Philip Taft and Philip Ross concludes that "the IWW in Everett and Centralia was the victim, and the violence was a response to attacks made upon its members for exercising their constitutional rights."

Thus, it is no surprise that the question of violence was a perennial matter of discussion and debate within the IWW. Some, like Arturo Giovannitti, Elizabeth Gurley Flynn, and Vincent St. John, took the position that while the union did not favor violence, it would not shy away from its use if necessary to accomplish the social revolution. "Smiling Joe" Ettor, on the other hand, agreed with Bill Haywood that the only kind of force to which the organization could lend its name was the use of the general strike for the overthrow of capitalism. Haywood, who had been secretary treasurer of the Western Federation of Miners during a violent period in its history, described the goals of the IWW in 1913:

It will be revolution, but it will be bloodless revolution. The world is turning against war. People are sickened at the thought. Even labor wars of the old type are passing. I should never think of conducting a strike in the old way. There will never be another Coeur d'Alene, another Cripple Creek. I, for one, have turned my back on violence. It wins nothing.

When we strike now, we strike with our hands in our pockets. We have a new kind of violence—the havoc we raise with money by laying down our tools. Our strength lies in the overwhelming power of numbers.

Conlin has also observed that "to dwell on the martyrs and the debacle that did in the I.W.W. (i.e., government repression after World War I) is to detract or at least to distract from the Wobblies' importance as a functioning and ... apparently successful union."

===== Violence and sabotage as tactics =====
In 1969 the History of Violence in America reported about the 1918 trial of IWW officers and members,

Unlike the other national federations such as the Knights of Labor, the American Federation of Labor, and the Congress of Industrial Organizations, the IWW advocated direct action and sabotage. These doctrines were never clearly defined, but did not include violence against isolated individuals. Pamphlets on sabotage by Andre Tridon, Walker C. Smith, and Elizabeth Gurley Flynn were published, but Haywood and the lawyers for the defense at the Federal trial for espionage in Chicago in 1918 denied that sabotage meant destruction of property. Instead Haywood claimed it meant slowing down on the job when the employer refused to make concessions.

Foner observes that the IWW's general executive board issued a statement opposing violence:

[The IWW] does not now and never has believed in or advocated either destruction or violence as a means of accomplishing industrial reform; first, because no principle was ever settled by such methods; second, because industrial history has taught us that when strikers resort to violence and unlawful methods, all the resources of Government are immediately arrayed against them and they lose their cause; third, because such methods destroy the constructive impulse which it is the purpose of this organization to foster and develop in order that the workers may fit themselves to assume their places in the new society.

Robert Hoxie writes,

In the popular conception of things revolutionary unionism is generally distinguished by violence and sabotage. The tendency, however, to make violence the hall-mark of revolutionary unionists is a great mistake. The bulk of revolutionary unionists embraces the most peaceful citizens we have, and on principle. Most violence in labor troubles is committed by conservative unionists or by the unorganized.

Hoxie continues,

In short, violence in labor troubles is a unique characteristic of no kind of unionism, but is a general and apparently inevitable incident of the rise of the working class to consciousness and power in capitalistic society.

Secondly, revolutionary unionism is not to be marked off from other kinds of unionism by its employment of sabotage as an offensive and defensive weapon. It is true that sabotage is a weapon whose use is highly characteristic of revolutionary unionism, but the notion that its use is confined to revolutionary unionists fades out the moment its true character and varied forms are known. It is moreover distinctly repudiated by many revolutionary unionists, is not confined to revolutionary unions, and, it might be added, is not confined to workers alone.

Hoxie explains,

As the unionists point out, essentially the same thing is practiced by employers and dealers who adulterate goods, make shoddy, conceal defects of products, and sell goods for what they are not.

==== Legislation, injunctions and law ====
In 1916, the Commission on Industrial Relations, created by the U.S. Congress, reported,

The greatest uncertainty exists regarding the legal status of almost every act which may be done in connection with an industrial dispute. In fact, it may be said that it depends almost entirely upon the personal opinion and social ideas of the court in whose jurisdiction the acts may occur.

The general effect of the decisions of American courts, however, has been to restrict the activities of labor organizations and deprive them of their most effective weapons, namely, the boycott and the power of picketing, while on the other hand the weapons of employers, namely, the power of arbitrary discharge, of blacklisting, and of bringing in strikebreakers, have been maintained and legislative attempts to restrict the employers' powers have generally been declared unconstitutional by the courts. Furthermore, an additional weapon has been placed in the hands of the employers by many courts in the form of sweeping injunctions, which render punishable acts which would otherwise be legal, and also result in effect in depriving the workers of the right to jury trial.

The report includes the testimony of Judge Walter Clark, Chief Justice of the Supreme Court of North Carolina:

Chairman Walsh. Have you studied the effect of the use of injunctions in labor disputes generally in the United States, as a student of economics and the law?

Judge Clark. I do not think they can be justified, sir, * * * [Their effect] has been, of course, to irritate the men, because they feel that in an anglo-Saxon community every man has a right to a trial by jury and that to take him up and compel him to be tried by a judge, is not in accordance with the principles of equality, liberty, and justice.

Chairman Walsh. Do you think that has been one of the causes of social unrest in the United States?

Judge Clark. Yes, sir, and undoubtedly will be more so, unless it is remedied.

The congressional report concludes from this exchange,

...opinions cited above are very impressive and are convincing that the workers have great reason for their attitude... such injunctions have in many cases inflicted grievous injury upon workmen engaged in disputes with their employers, and ... their interests have been seriously prejudiced by the denial of jury trial, which every criminal is afforded, and by trial before the judge against whom the contempt was alleged ... It is felt to be a duty, therefore, to register a solemn protest against this condition...

By most accounts, in spite of its apparent candor, the U.S. Congress failed to act upon this investigation of the reasons for industrial unrest.

One significant difference between the IWW and mainstream unions (specifically, the AFL) concerns their interpretation of, and reaction to the law. Laws are passed by the state. AFL unions concerned themselves with issues of law and order. In the eyes of the IWW, the state was variously considered irrelevant, illegitimate, or merely an extension of capitalist power. The IWW Preamble and Constitution, which encapsulate the organization's philosophy and to some extent, formulate policy, are silent on the specific question of government, yielding only a strong implication that government as constituted would cease to exist in a Wobbly world (a "new society within the shell of the old").

To Wobblies beaten by cops while picketing the job, the only law that mattered was the law of the jungle. In the words of historian Melvyn Dubofsky, the AFL sought industrial harmony, the IWW praised perpetual industrial war.

Dubofsky concludes that while Wobbly speechmaking often created a wrong perception of IWW intentions and practices, the IWW actually practiced passive resistance and promoted non-violence. Yet passive resistance is distinct from pacifism. Dubofsky wrote,

Nonviolence was only a means to an end. If passive resistance resulted only in beatings and deaths, then the IWW threatened to respond in kind.

Arturo Giovannitti summarized his perception of the Wobbly philosophy, "The generally accepted notion seems to be that to kill is a great crime, but to be killed is the greatest."

Labor legislation can have a very significant impact upon union organizing, and efforts to organize the coal industry offer a good example. Coal miners had been struggling for sixty years to organize unions in the Western United States, with little success. All of that changed in the early 1930s when the companies began to perceive a difference between the business unionism of the United Mine Workers, and their more radical competitors.

In 1933, Franklin Delano Roosevelt established the National Industrial Recovery Act (NIRA) including Section 7(a), guaranteeing the right to collective bargaining. The law originated with the coal industry, which had been beset by organizing drives by radical labor organizations such as the Industrial Workers of the World (Colorado strike in 1927), the Progressive Miners in Illinois, the West Virginia Mine Workers Union, and the National Miners Union (formed in 1928), which also was founded on the principles of class struggle. Facing such stiff competition, the AFL-affiliated United Mine Workers was a "shambles" during this period, with its membership having dropped to less than a quarter of its former strength.

After decades of hostility toward unions, in 1931 the coal industry's magazine, Coal Age, began editorializing in favor of the "desired stabilization of wages and working conditions [via] recognition and acceptance of an outside labor organization." John L. Lewis, President of the United Mine Workers, later claimed that his union had written the language that ultimately appeared in the NIRA. The NIRA favored a specific type of industrial union, and greatly increased the barriers to organizing radical unions.

The United Mine Workers union was also supported by the government and by some coal companies against their more radical rivals. In some cases, the United Mine Workers legitimized strike breaking by issuing union cards to miners who had crossed picket lines of a rival organization. By 1936, the United Mine Workers had gained contracts with all the major coal operators in North America.

=== Minority unionism ===
In U.S. legal terminology, the concept of minority unionism refers to the situation in which workers who wish to engage in concerted activity, which means action taken by workers for mutual aid or protection. In the U.S., such activity is protected by federal labor law. Generally speaking, concerted activity takes place, and is therefore protected, whenever two or more employees act together to improve their terms and conditions of employment. (The protections are fairly broad, although corporations frequently benefit from employees not knowing their rights.)

According to union activists, workers engaging in concerted activity may also be said to be engaging in minority unionism. While the status of concerted activity is well established, the precise legal status of bargaining rights for a minority union, or alternatively of bargaining rights for individual members of such a union, is not clear. In 2005, Charles Morris published a legal treatise called The Blue Eagle At Work: Reclaiming Democratic Rights in the American Workplace which offers an as yet untested legal theory about minority unionism.

However, the Industrial Workers of the World have held from the organization's founding that workers, whether in a majority or not, nonetheless have the right and the ability to join to act in their own best interest, whether through traditional bargaining, or by other means. This is quite different from more orthodox unions, which typically rely upon union recognition by a workplace majority and a collective bargaining agreement, accompanied by dues checkoff and other conventions, before they will represent a group of employees.

=== Dues collection ===
The IWW relies upon members to submit dues voluntarily, instead of relying on the "dues check off" system, in which dues are automatically deducted from workers' paychecks by their employer. Throughout the organization's history, a constitutional provision has prohibited IWW organizations from allowing employers to handle union dues.

IWW dues collection most typically operates according to the Job Delegate system, which was developed by the Agricultural Workers Organization (AWO) of the IWW.

=== Boxcar Organizing ===
Beginning around 1915 with the rise of the Agricultural Workers Organization, the field delegates for the IWW used itinerant workers' means of transportation, illegally hopping freight trains, to grow to their ranks. Delegates rode trains and demanded to see a Red Card, proof of membership in the IWW, from each hobo bound for the harvests. If a rider could not produce a card, he or she either had to purchase one from the delegate or get off the train. IWW organizer Harry Howard describes an instance of this in a 1916 letter to Solidarity, the union's national newspaper, writing, "We left on the night of August 10th with twenty-five or thirty other fellow workers. We took charge of the train and ditched all unorganized men at stops north of Fargo." In 1922, the U.S. Marshal to the Western District of Washington collected 19 affidavits from freight train riders in that state who admit seeing this practice. One reads, "The IWW tried to make me take out a card in North Dakota but I refused. When in the State of Washington… I was forced to take out a card or be thrown off in a desolate country." This tactic lost effectiveness as the automobile supplanted the freight train as the most popular form of transportation for itinerant laborers in the mid- to late-1920s.

== Publicity and the Wobbly image ==
The Industrial Workers of the World has enjoyed and occasionally suffered from a distinctive public image. The organization has been chronicled in fiction as varied as Zane Grey's anti-Wobbly book Desert of Wheat, and James Jones' influential 1951 novel, From Here to Eternity. Conlin attributes some of the chronicles to "fascination with the vitality of those on the bottom. He notes, however, that a romantic image of the Wobblies was not ever entirely inappropriate. For example, Haywood was frequently the recipient of invitations from Mabel Dodge Luhan and "other fashionable literati," and "a romanticized IWW" was the subject of books and poems throughout the 1910s. Conlin observes that "no later than 1908, the Wobblies were vividly conscious of their romantic aspect and took easily to self-dramatization." This was evident in their singing, in their song parodies, in their skits, in their poetry and in their cartoons. From soap boxing to the Paterson pageant, from their colorful lingo to "building the battleship" in the free speech fight jails, Wobblies seemed to instinctively comprehend the benefits of publicity for their cause.

Conlin does note, however, that shortly after the 1913 Paterson Pageant at Madison Square Garden, the IWW officially disclaimed the utility of such productions, and "turned to more proper union activity" (in a period which coincided with the organization's dramatic growth) until the "apocalypse" of government intervention in 1917–1918.

== See also ==
- Anti-union violence
- Labor federation competition in the United States
- One Big Union (concept)
