= Lumber Workers Industrial Union =

Defunct North American trade union

Lumber Workers' Industrial Union
- Founded: 1917
- Dissolved: 1924
- Location: United States of America, Canada
- Members: 20,000
- Affiliations: Industrial Workers of the World, One Big Union

The Lumber Workers' Industrial Union (LWIU) was a labor union in the United States and Canada which existed between 1917 and 1924. It organised workers in the timber industry and was affiliated with the Industrial Workers of the World (IWW).

== History ==
Between 1915 and 1917, the Agricultural Workers Organization (AWO) of the IWW organized hundreds of thousands of migratory farm workers throughout the midwest and western United States. Building on the success of the AWO, the IWW's LWIU used similar tactics to organize lumberjacks and other timber workers, both in the Deep South and the Pacific Northwest of the United States and Canada, between 1917 and 1924. The IWW lumber strike of 1917 led to the eight-hour day and vastly improved working conditions in the Pacific Northwest. Even though mid-century historians would give credit to the US Government and "forward thinking lumber magnates" for agreeing to such reforms, an IWW strike forced these concessions.

The LWIU briefly joined the One Big Union organization in Canada. But that organization differed structurally from the IWW. While the IWW organized on industrial lines, the OBU of Canada focused more on organizing workers geographically. The absence of an existing industrial union structure within the Canadian OBU caused the LWIU to pull out its 20,000 members. According to the 1922 publication Industrial Unionism in America, "Their withdrawal was a staggering blow from which the O. B. U. [never] recovered."

In 1924 the IWW was split by a division between centralizers and decentralizers. The modern IWW website describes an offshoot led by James Rowan of the LWIU, who invoked the E-P (Emergency Program.) "The E-Pers believed that the administration of the IWW was too strongly emphasizing 'Political Action' as opposed to Organizing on the Job. The E-P claimed to oppose 'centralism' in favor of 'decentralism', but the E-P sought to centralize power within individual Industrial Unions."

== See also ==
- Industrial Workers of the World
- Labor federation competition in the United States
