= Silent agitators =

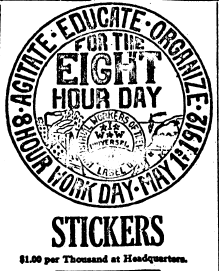
"Agitate - Educate - Organize" I.W.W. advertisement, 1911

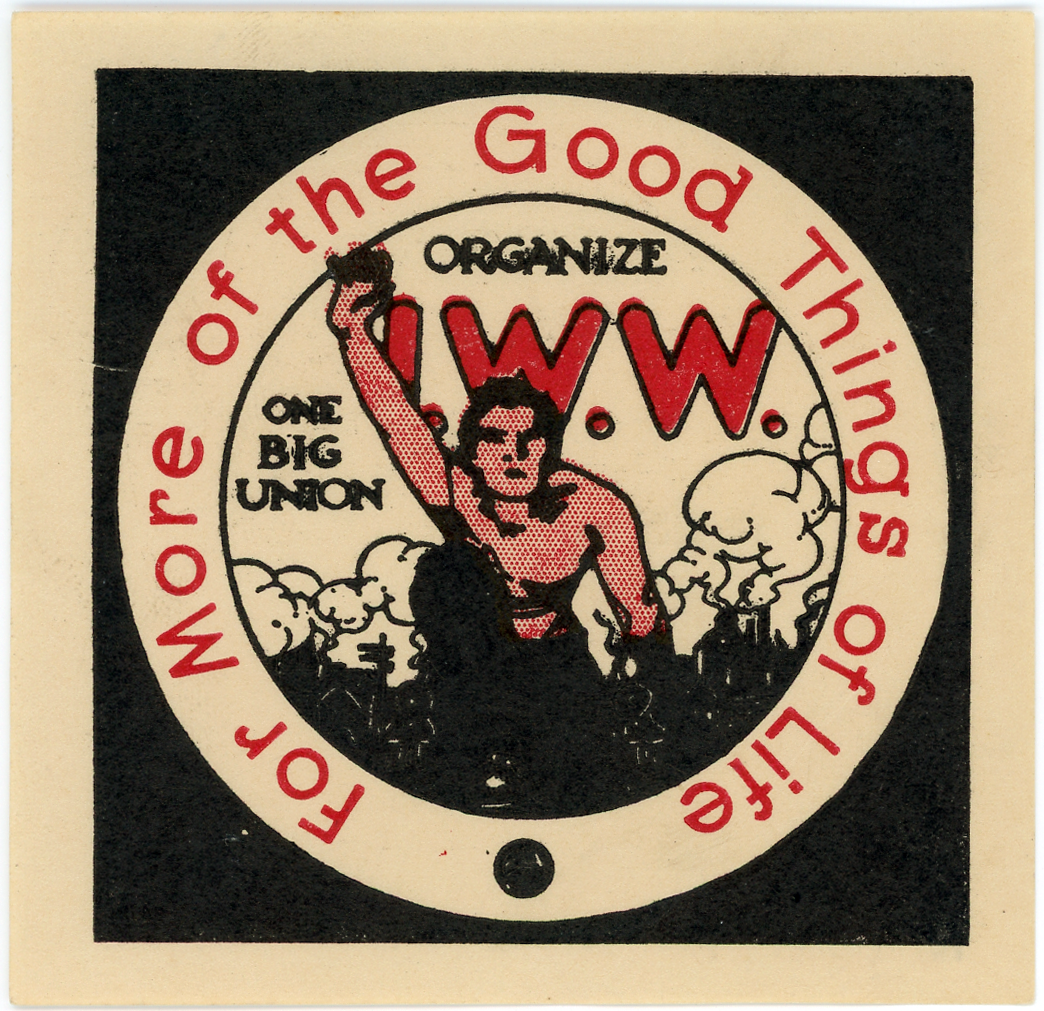
I.W.W. "stickerette" - For More of the Good Things of Life

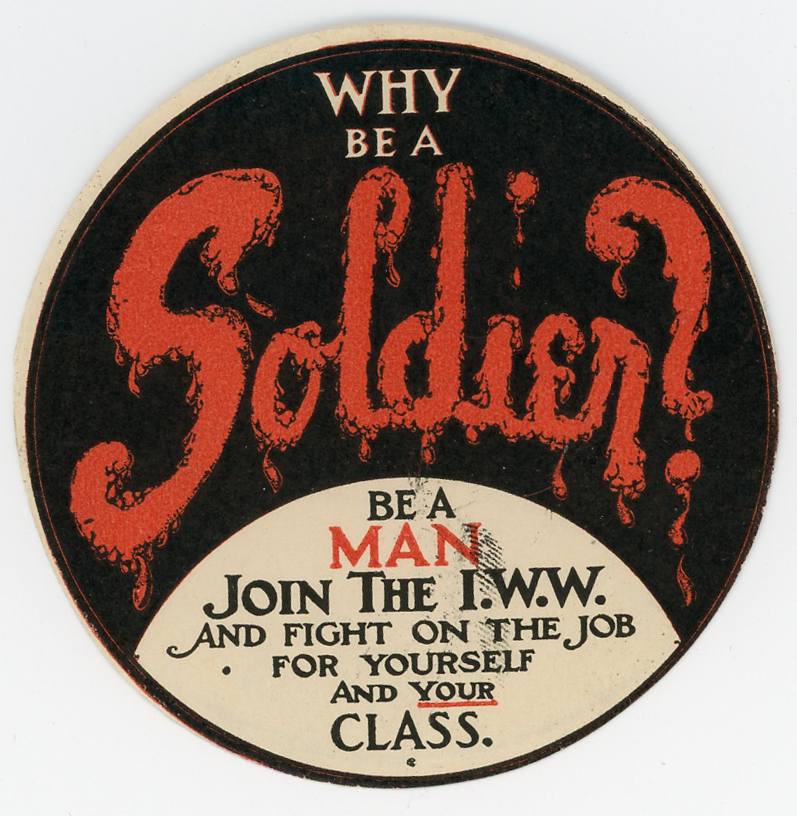
I.W.W "stickerette" - Why Be a Soldier? Be a Man.

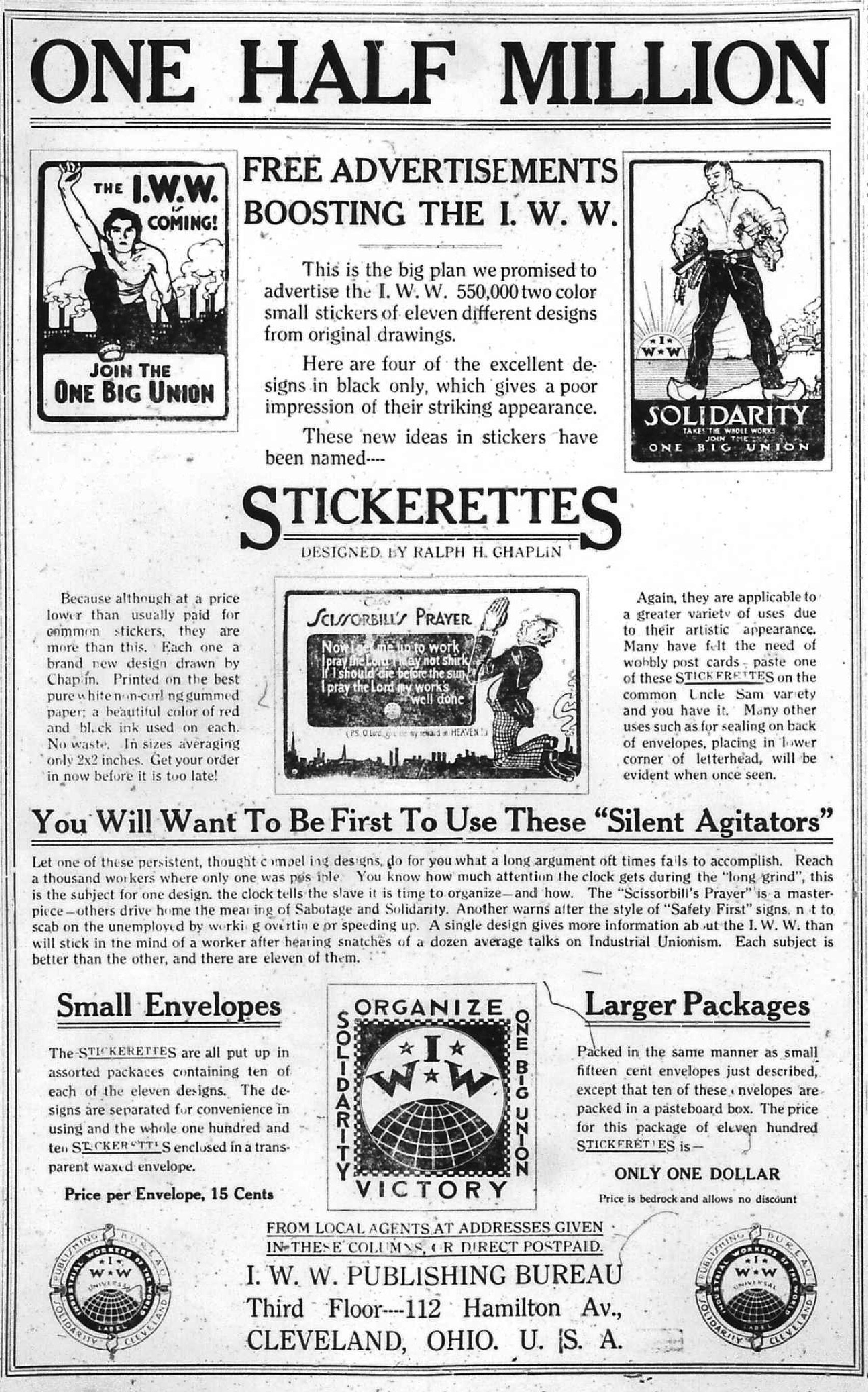
"One Half Million Stickerettes" Solidarity, November 20, 1915

Silent agitators (also called silent organizers and stickerettes) are stickers used by the Industrial Workers of the World (IWW).

The IWW publication Industrial Worker of Spokane, Washington, advertised stickers as early as April 20, 1911.

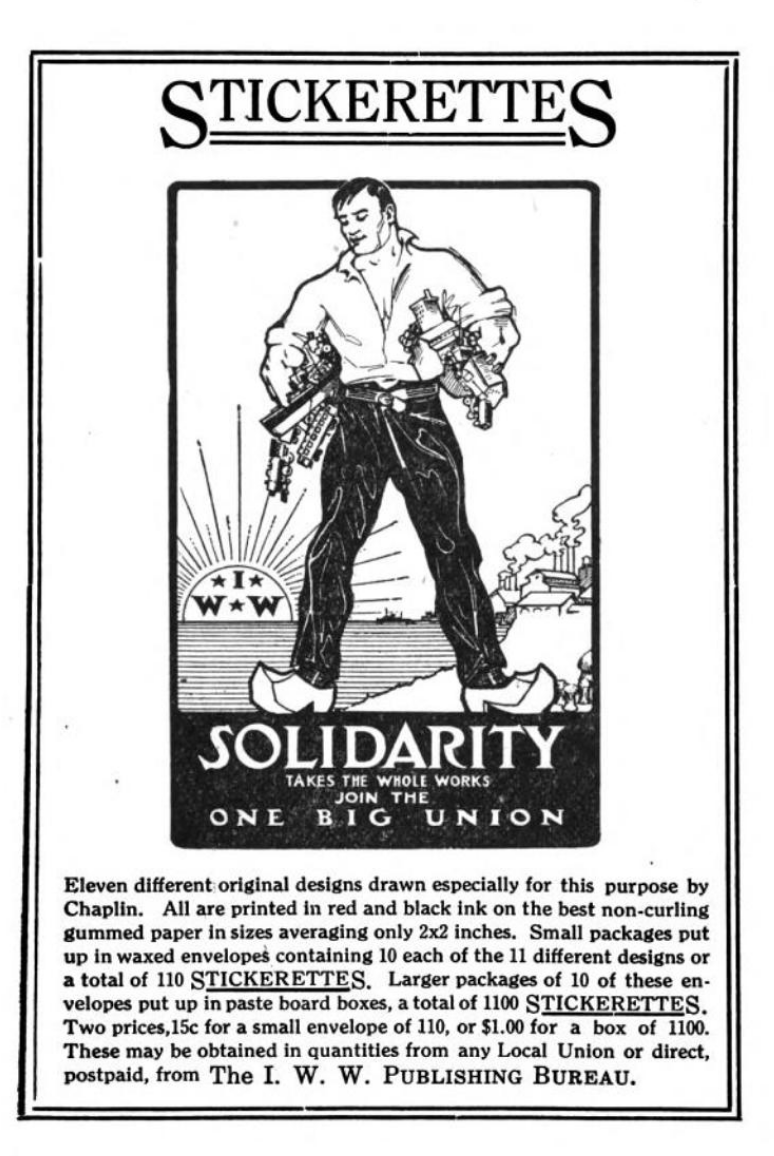
Industrial Workers of the World 1916 advertisement for "stickerettes"

Sociologist Eric Margolis has written about the history of such media:

Wobbly organizers were revolutionary fish swimming in the sea of bindle stiffs and tramp workers. The Wobbly card was a ticket to ride the rails. "Side door coaches," as box cars were called, were plastered with paper stickers, "silent organizers," that Wobs put up everywhere they passed: "Join the One Big Union," "I Will Win," "Win a World."

Silent agitators were produced by the millions. Margolis described the way such stickers were used when the Wobblies called a strike in 1927:

Bill Lloyd, Superintendent at the Puritan Mine (in Colorado's northern coal field), went to work one chilly Autumn morning to discover Wobbly stickers pasted on every timber and cross beam in the place: "Join the Wobblies, Join the Wobblies," he said indignantly, "From the bottom of the shaft clear to the working faces, see, they had these posters."

IWW leader Big Bill Haywood described in his autobiography how the IWW issued stickers to propagandize against the war. The stickers declared, "Why be a soldier? Be a man. Join the I.W.W. and fight on the job for yourself and your class."

== See also ==
- Black cat
- Wobbly lingo
- Industrial Workers of the World philosophy and tactics
