= Agricultural Workers Organization =

Former trade union of the United States

Agricultural Workers' Organization
- Founded: April 15, 1915
- Dissolved: 1930
- Location: United States of America
- Members: 100,000 (peak)
- Affiliations: Industrial Workers of the World

The Agricultural Workers Organization (AWO), later known as the Agricultural Workers Industrial Union, was an organization of farm workers throughout the United States and Canada formed on April 15, 1915, in Kansas City. It was supported by, and a subsidiary organization of, the Industrial Workers of the World (IWW). Although the IWW had advocated the abolition of the wage system as an ultimate goal since its own formation ten years earlier, the AWO's founding convention sought rather to address immediate needs, and championed a ten-hour work day, premium pay for overtime, a minimum wage, good food and bedding for workers. In 1917 the organization changed names to the Agricultural Workers Industrial Union (AWIU) as part of a broader reorganization of IWW industrial unions.

As a member organization of the IWW, the AWO embraced a variety of tactics in order to organize workers. While the AWO resolved to prohibit street speaking and soap boxing – a common method by which the parent organization communicated its more radical message to workers – soapboxing was practiced by AWO delegates, and met with considerable success. The AWO developed the roving delegate system for member sign-up and dues collection, which is still used by the IWW. Within two years, the AWO had achieved a membership of a hundred thousand.

== History ==
=== Industrial Workers of the World (IWW) ===
Members of the American Socialist Party were the founders of the labor organization Industrial Workers of the World (IWW). The IWW was found on June 27, 1905, in Chicago, Illinois. A group of radicals held a conference and their primary goals were to overthrow the wage system and get rid of capitalism which gave the IWW their platform. Members of the IWW were commonly known as wobblies who advocated for socialism, and did not discriminate based on race or gender. William D. Haywood, Eugene V. Debs, and Daniel De Leon were the founders and leading heads behind the IWW. These founders and the IWW were against the American Federation of Labor (AFL) and was the only labor group who opposed World War I. The IWW consisted of unskilled workers who represented farm workers and miners who demanded higher wages and better working conditions. The IWW did not discriminate on class and welcomed workers from all groups such as women, minorities, immigrants, and the unemployed. Youth groups were even encouraged by the IWW and followed in their steps by organizing their own unions. They referred to themselves as "Junior Wobblies".

==== Founders of the IWW ====
At the beginning of the IWW there were three main founders and leaders. These three founders include William D. Haywood, Eugene V. Debs, and Daniel De Leon who were all a part of the Socialist Party. Haywood believed strikes and boycotts were the most efficient way to reach the goals of IWW, but De Leon and Debs believed they could achieve their goals though the Trade Union Movement and Socialist Party. This disagreement caused De Leon and Debs to leave behind the IWW which caused the wobblies to split into two different groups.

William D. Haywood was a part of the Western Federation of Miners (WFM) and was the main founder and of the IWW. In the WFM Haywood fought for raising wages and wanted to ban children workers from working in the mines. Eventually Haywood became the secretary-treasurer of the WFM, and in 1901 he joined the American Socialist Party.

Eugene V. Debs was an activist in the Trade Union Movement and eventually became the national secretary of the Brotherhood of Locomotive Firemen.

Daniel De Leon was a Marxist who was a part of the Knights of Labor. De Leon was an editor for the Social Labor Party, and was extremely opposed to capitalism and wanted to overthrow it.

Through the Socialist Party these three men gathered and formed the IWW.

=== Founding of the Agricultural Workers Organization ===
On April 15, 1915, the Industrial Workers of the World (IWW) all gathered in Kansas City, MO in attempt to form an organization directed towards harvest workers. This conference led to the emergence of the Agricultural Workers Organization (AWO) that focused on recruiting farmers in the Western United States and Canada to join one big union. This new organization demanded:

1. freedom from illegal restraint;
2. adequate housing and food;
3. a 10-hour workday;
4. a $4.00 minimum wage;
5. and free transportation in answering any long-distance call.

The harvest workers stated that if these requirements were met then they would in return perform their best work.

To organize the wheat harvest in the west, the Agricultural Workers Organization used two successful tactics: job delegate and on the job strike. For the job delegate tactic, the IWW assigned members to work the fields and assist farmers with the harvest. The on the job strike tactic was threatening member withdrawal of productive efficiency to win over employer demands. These two highly successful tactics resulted in the Agricultural Workers Organization's ability to organize thousands of individuals in the agricultural, lumber, construction, and oil industries. The AWO was known for being able to bring in new members to the union while also improving working conditions for the harvest workers. Many of the workers employed at these industries faced harsh conditions that made collective action necessary for survival. Harsh conditions included, lice infested camps, long hours, intense heat, and earnings of $2.50 a day.

=== Delegates ===
Agricultural Workers Organization's Secretary-Treasurer Walter Nef designated two types of delegates, field delegates (or walking delegates) and stationary delegates, who organized in main wheat belt towns without continuous migration. Field delegates were agricultural workers who recruited new members and acted as representatives of the AWO. Field delegates carried materials such as: union application materials, union membership dues books, dues stamps, and Wobbly literature necessary to recruit agricultural workers. Compensation for field delegates was based on commission per new member so it was an incentive to recruit as many new members as possible. To recruit members to the AWO, field delegates sometimes freight trains in and around harvest areas and demand to see a Red Card, proof of membership to the IWW, from all other riders. If a hobo could not produce a membership card, the field delegates forced the rider to purchase a card or get off the train. By doing so, the AWO hoped to create an "800 mile picket line" along the wheat belt ensuring the IWW controlled all harvest jobs. They were also organizers at the workplace and presented grievances to the ranch foremen and farmers; holding full organizer's responsibilities, delegates had the ability to call a strike against a farmer if the farmer did not address grievances. Field delegates had direct contact with other agricultural workers and were able to experience the working conditions at the field level; direct communication with both workers and ranch foremen, including farmers, allowed for negotiation of wages and delegates would not accept jobs that paid under the union scale of $3 per day. The delegate system effectively recruited new members and established multiple locals of the AWO, but not many recruits stayed with the union due to the migrant nature.

=== Multiracial Organizing ===
The AWO did not restrict membership to a particular race or ethnicity, as did craft unions. The AWO built solidarity among its members by emphasizing the shared exploitation in the fields and living quarters. The Wobbly press's attempted to build solidarity by drawing on the similar working conditions among white, Asian, Hispanic, and African American workers. Conscious of employer's use of race to divide workers, the Industrial Worker included Ernest Riebe's cartoon whose character "Mr. Block" was controlled by employers who used race and ethnic backgrounds to divide workers. The cartoon was addressed toward several ethnicities and exposed the strategies employers used to obtain the most production for the little pay.

In an earlier example of multiracial organizing among IWW agricultural workers was in the 1913 Wheatland Hop-Fields Riot in Wheatland, California. Ralph Durst and his brother, owners of a large farm and ranch, refused to address the complaints of their agricultural workers who presented a list of demands to them. In response to their refusal and firing of the leading IWW members, Wobblies met that same night and included speakers who spoke in German, Greek, Italian, Arabic, and Spanish to the crowd in order to gain the most supporters among the group of workers.

The decline of the Agricultural Workers' Industrial Union (AWIU) the mid 1920s was also influenced by the inability to adapt to the rapidly changing demographics of farmworkers in the West Coast. Asians and Latinos composed a large part of the workforce; the AWIU struggled to incorporate strategies that united a culturally and socially diverse workforce.

== Agricultural Workers Organization Yakima Valley ==
During the summer of 1916, farm workers in Washington State campaigned to establish the Agricultural Workers Organization in Washington's Yakima Valley. With many AWO leaders residing in the region already, the IWW sent out AWO leaders to reach out to the independent farmers in the valley. The Agricultural Workers Organization's plan was to convince the harvest workers to join their union. However, most of the farmers in the area did not want the AWO taking over their town. Eventually, the harvest workers in Yakima Valley went on strike to demand better wages, but the strike was soon halted once local law enforcement became involved.

== Decline of the Agricultural Workers Organization ==
By 1917 the Agricultural Workers Organization had close to 20,000 members. In this same year the AWO was renamed the Agricultural Workers Industrial Union (AWIU). Even though the AWIU coincided in the midst of the Red Scare and World War One, the AWIU's membership still continued to grow reaching 25,000 members by 1921. The AWIU eventually became the biggest financial contributor to the Industrial Workers of the World. "Nearly $85,000 of the money the AWIU had raised in 1922 [$135,055 total] went to support strikes in Oregon and California; and harvesters had also provided defense funds for Wobblies in Centralia, Washington, and made a large donation to the IWW's Work People's College in Duluth, Minnesota"(Sellars). However, because of the frightening split in Wobbly ranks in 1924, the AWIU experienced a steep decline in its members. The AWIU eventually fell as a result of the rise of new technologies. These technologies eventually drove the majority of harvest workers out of labor.

The last annual convention (the 21st) was held in Seattle in 1929.

== See also ==
- Industrial Workers of the World
- Labor federation competition in the United States
