= Thomas J. Hagerty =

American priest and trade union activist (1857 – 1920s)

Hagerty, a founder of the Industrial Workers of the World, in 1905

Thomas Joseph Hagerty (October 1857 – sometime in the 1920s) was an American Roman Catholic priest and trade union activist. Hagerty is remembered as one of the founding members of the Industrial Workers of the World (IWW), as author of the influential Preamble to the Constitution of the IWW, and as the creator of "Hagerty's Wheel", a frequently reproduced illustration depicting the interrelation of the IWW's constituent industrial unions.

Hagerty abruptly abandoned the radical movement shortly after the formation of the IWW, adopting the pseudonym "Ricardo Moreno" and working as a Spanish teacher and an oculist. After 1920, Hagerty lived on the streets of Chicago in conditions of dire poverty, eking out a meager existence as a beggar.

== Biography ==
=== Early years ===
Thomas Joseph Hagerty was born in Illinois to Irish immigrant parents. He attended St. Ignatius College in Chicago before attending seminary at Saint Mary's Seminary in Baltimore, then returned to Chicago for ordination at Holy Name Cathedral on June 29, 1895.

=== Activist priest ===
Hagerty is believed to have become a Marxist about 1892 and to have spent his early life attempting to rectify the teachings of the church and the socialist movement.

Hagerty's first posting was to St. Agatha's Parish in Chicago in 1895, where he served as assistant to the rector. He was assigned to St. Joseph's Church in Cleburne, Texas in the Diocese of Dallas in 1897 before being promoted to rector of Our Lady of Victory Church in Paris, Texas in 1901. He was transferred to Our Lady of Sorrows Church in Las Vegas, New Mexico later that same year.

As a Catholic priest in the Southwestern United States, Hagerty came into frequent contact with Mexican railroad workers, the mistreatment of whom by their employers angered him. Finding little socialist writing to be available in Spanish, Hagerty began translating a number of short works from German, French, and English. When Hagerty was warned by the railroads to stay out of labor relations, he reportedly told a messenger "Tell the people who sent you here that I have a brace of Colts and can hit a dime at twenty paces."

Upon arriving in New Mexico in 1901, Hagerty became associated with the American Labor Union (ALU) and the Western Federation of Miners (WFM). During the summer of 1902, Hagerty went on a tour of mining camps in Colorado with Socialist Party of America (SPA) orator Eugene V. Debs, attempting to recruit the impoverished miners to the ALU and the SPA. This blatantly political activity brought Hagerty into conflict with his superiors, resulting in his suspension by his archbishop. Despite this fall from grace with the church hierarchy, Hagerty continued to consider himself a priest in good standing, writing in International Socialist Review:

"While it is true that I have withdrawn from the technical work of the ministry, the withdrawal implies no derogation of my sacerdotal character. I am as much a priest today as I ever was. I have not separated myself from the communion of the Catholic Church; and I hold myself as much a member thereof as the Pope himself."

Hagerty remained defiant of his superiors, declaring that "bishops and priests exceed their authority when they use the influence of their position to oppose a movement whose highest purpose is the industrial liberation of the wage slaves of the world." Catholics were "not bound to pay any attention to them in such matters," Hagerty asserted, adding that the papal encyclicals of Pope Leo XIII against socialism "have no more authority than that which attaches to the opinions of any private theologian."

=== Industrial union activist ===
Cover of Hagerty's pamphlet Economic Discontent and Its Remedy, published by Eugene and Theodore Debs in 1902.

Hagerty was employed as a touring organizer for the Socialist Party in 1903, traveling the breadth of the United States to deliver lectures on behalf of the party. Hagerty proved of value to the Socialists for his ability to appeal to Catholic workers on the basis of the social gospel, standing in contrast to the conservative church establishment, which remained staunchly and outspokenly anti-socialist. Hagerty proved to be a skillful orator and authored several pamphlets as a written adjunct to his activities as a party lecturer. Hagerty attempted to instill the idea that radical political ideas and traditional theological conceptions were fully independent. In his pamphlet Economic Discontent and Its Remedy, Hagerty wrote:

"As a matter of fact, Socialism has no more to do with religion than astronomy or biology. Socialism is an economic science, not a system of dogmatic beliefs. It is as much beyond the scope of Socialism to deal with Divine revelation as it is beyond the range of the Republican Party to advance a new exegesis of the Davidic Psalms.

"If there are atheists and infidels in the Socialist Party, it is not the fault of Socialism. They have as much right to membership there as in any of the other political parties under a free government.... No one would dream of censuring the Democratic Party because the founder of that party, Thomas Jefferson, was an infidel in the ecclesiastical sense of the term. There are many physicians who do not believe in God, yet no one is so ignorant as to condemn the science of Therapeutics on that account. One does not enquire into the religion of the architect before admiring some Corinthian structure which he has designed, nor the particular church affiliations of the bricklayer who built the walls of the house which one is about to buy or rent."

Hagerty was further radicalized during 1903 and 1904, a period marked by particular violence among the mining communities of the American west. Hagerty emerged as a leading critic of electorally-oriented socialist gradualists, who sought slow evolution towards the ultimate socialist goal by means of "boring from within" the established craft unions of the American Federation of Labor. Hagerty was not long in moving outside of the Socialist Party's orbit altogether, changing the focus of his efforts to the construction of new radical industrial unions. In 1904 Hagerty took a position as editor of a short-lived monthly publication of the American Labor Union called Voice of Labor, through which he gave voice to his ideas about organization of workers in industry. It was in this capacity as a leading union magazine editor of the day that Hagerty was invited early in January 1905 as one of 23 industrial union activists from 9 organizations to a secret Chicago conference for the planning of a new national union. Hagerty help to draft the gathering's "Industrial Union Manifesto," a document which was to serve as an intellectual foundation stone for the establishment of the Industrial Workers of the World at a convention later that same year.

At the founding convention Hagerty served as secretary of the Constitution Committee, and as such wrote the preamble to the IWW Constitution — a short and effective manifesto which became a fundamental element of the organization's official doctrine for decades to follow. Hagerty favored direct action, as opposed to political action of the Socialist Party and its left wing rival, the Socialist Labor Party, referring to them as "slowcialists." Emphasizing this point during a speech to the founding convention of the IWW, Hagerty declared: "The Ballot Box is simply a capitalist concession. Dropping pieces of paper into a hole in a box never did achieve emancipation of the working class, and in my opinion it never will."

=== Hagerty's Wheel of Fortune ===
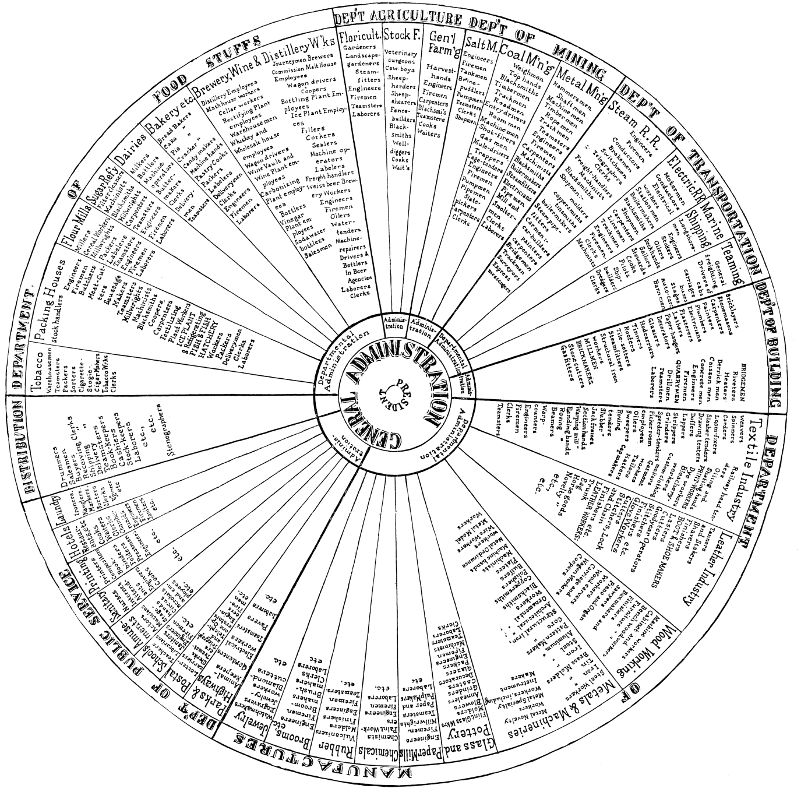
Father Hagerty's Wheel of Fortune, a classification of the industrial population, 1905.

Hagerty also produced a circular graphic commonly known as "Hagerty's Wheel", which depicted the various industrial unions comprising the Industrial Workers of the World (IWW) organization as interrelated spokes. The diagram was around the clock divided into eight departments: Manufacture, Public Service, Distribution, Food Stuffs, Agriculture, Mining, Transportation, and Building, and in the centre a Central Administration. The diagram pretend to encompass "every imaginable type of economic activity and form of employment." It was Samuel Gompers who sarcastically labelled the diagram "Father Hagerty's Wheel of Fortune".

=== Later years ===
Details about his later life remain murky. According to some accounts, Hagerty severed his connections with both the church and the IWW, adopted the pseudonym "Ricardo Moreno" and henceforth earned his living as a teacher of Spanish and an oculist. A "Thomas J. Hagerty, MD" gave a lecture in 1917 on "Vatican Theory and Practice" in Chicago for 10 cents' admission. One newspaper, during Hagerty's speaking tour on socialism in 1903, claimed that Hagerty had been educated in medicine and became a doctor before entering the priesthood.

From 1920 until the time of his death, Hagerty-Moreno lived as a derelict on the streets of Chicago's skid row. The few of his old comrades who located Hagerty in Chicago found him, in the words of Roland Boer, "living in deep poverty, eventually reliant on soup kitchens, a few cents from passers-by, missions for a bed, and free concerts to keep up his cultural interests." Hagerty-Moreno's death passed unremarked, probably sometime in the 1920s.

== Works ==
- Socialism and Freedom of Conscience. —Title listed among Hagerty's works in Economic Discontent, no known copies.
- Why Physicians Should Be Socialists. Terre Haute, IN: Standard Publishing Co., 1902.
- Economic Discontent and Its Remedy. Terre Haute, IN: Standard Publishing Co., 1902.
- "Socialism Versus Fads," International Socialist Review [Chicago], vol. 3, no. 8 (February 1903), pp. 449–453.

== See also ==
- Edward McGlynn
