= First Convention of the Industrial Workers of the World =

When Bill Haywood used a board to gavel to order the first convention of the Industrial Workers of the World (IWW), he announced, "this is the Continental Congress of the working class. We are here to confederate the workers of this country into a working class movement that shall have for its purpose the emancipation of the working class..."

== Preparation of 1905 convention ==
The first step towards the founding of the Industrial Workers of the World had already been taken in the fall of 1904 in an informal conference of six leaders in the socialist and labor movement: William Trautmann, George Estes, W. L. Hall, Isaac Cowen, Clarence Smith, and Thomas J. Hagerty. Others, including Eugene V. Debs and Charles O. Sherman, cooperated with them without being present at this meeting. These men shared the conviction that the existing American labor unions were unable to achieve real benefits for the workers. Some, such as the American Federation of Labor, were conservative and "aristocratic". Others, including the American Labor Union (ALU), the Western Federation of Miners (WFM) and the Socialist Trade and Labor Alliance (STALA), were ineffective in negotiating with employers for other reasons, such as a lack of solidarity and cooperation. The WFM had recently been damaged by government intervention and vigilantism during the Colorado Labor Wars.

Those at the informal conference decided to arrange a larger meeting to be held on January 2, 1905 in Chicago, to which about 30 people were invited. This secret conference - known as the January conference - was attended by 23 individuals, formally representing 9 organizations. The conference wrote a manifesto, which indicted the existing American labor movement - especially the craft form of organization; proposed plans for a new form of labor organization; and called for a convention to organize that new labor union. A founding convention was to be held again in Chicago on June 27. The manifesto was signed by all who were present at the January conference and sent to all unions in America as well as the industrial unions in Europe.

== 1905 convention ==
The 1905 convention of the IWW was attended by 203 radical trade unionists representing 43 organizations, which covered a wide range of occupations. 70 delegates from 23 organizations were authorized to install their organizations in the industrial union which was to be founded at the convention. 72 additional delegates from the other 20 organizations were only present to take notes on the proceedings and report back. The other 61 delegates did not represent any organization. Only the delegates who were empowered to install an organization in the IWW were given votings rights proportional to the number of members of their organization - the other delegates had only one vote each.

Of the labor unions represented at the convention, sixteen were at the time affiliated with the AFL. These were, however, mostly local unions with little strength in numbers. Only five of the organizations affiliated with the AFL were represented by delegates with instructions to install them in the proposed labor union. Hence, these unions played only a minor role at the meeting.

The 23 labor unions that sent a delegate with instructions to install them, had a total membership of 51,430. The total membership of the other 20 organizations was 91,500; this means that about one third of the membership represented at the convention held almost the entire voting power. Of the over 51,000 votes aggregated by those organizations prepared to install, 48,000 were distributed among five organizations: the Western Federation of Miners (27,000 members), American Labor Union (16,750 members), United Metal Workers (3,000 members), United Brotherhood of Railway Employees (2,087 members), and the Socialist Trade and Labor Alliance (1,450 members). Only a few organizations thus held almost all the power at the convention. The first two labor unions listed above outnumbered all others ten to one.
