= Steve Adams (miner) =

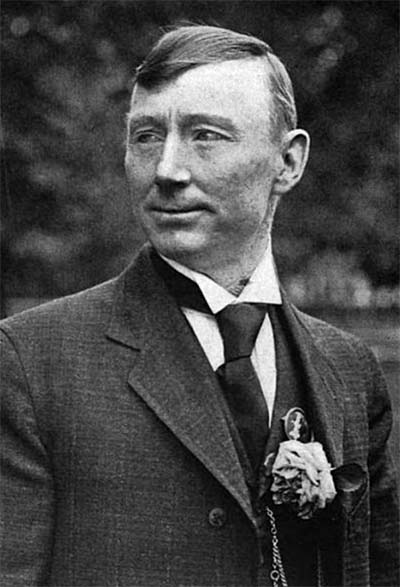
Steve Adams, a member of the Western Federation of Miners who was repeatedly put on trial, but never found guilty.

Steve Adams, sometimes known as Stephen Adams, was an American miner and member of the Western Federation of Miners (WFM) in the early 1900s. Adams was named as an accomplice in several murders by Harry Orchard, who said that the murders were done at the orders of the WFM leadership. Adams was tried three times for murder, but was never convicted.

Adams played a role in events surrounding the murder trials of Western Federation of Miners (WFM) leaders Bill Haywood, Charles Moyer, and George Pettibone, all charged with conspiring to murder former Idaho Governor Frank Steunenberg, allegedly in retaliation of the governor's role in the miner uprising in Coeur d'Alene. The investigations were led by famed Pinkerton agent James McParland. As a witness for the state who recanted, Adams is particularly notable for his comments about the methods used by agent McParland to turn defendants against each other.

== The Haywood trial ==
Pinkerton detective James McParland had WFM member Harry Orchard in custody, and had obtained an elaborate confession. However, McParland knew that he needed more than the confession of one man to convict Bill Haywood, who was being tried first among the trio of WFM leaders. Steve Adams was "a thirty-nine-year-old former Kansas City butcher and Cripple Creek miner with heavy, drooping eyelids and a booze-blotched complexion." Harry Orchard had described Adams as an accomplice in several crimes. As in the cases of Haywood, Moyer, and Pettibone, McParland relied upon a perjured warrant to cross state lines and grab Adams. The prisoner wasn't charged with any crime, but was held at the penitentiary in Idaho with Orchard. This was not according to McParland's plans:

If arrested, Adams was supposed to be kept in a separate cell away from Orchard as McParland explicitly spelled out to the warden. To prime a man for confessing, McParland required solitary confinement, a penetrating silence, the watchful presence of a stony guard, and as few contacts as possible. Adams was to be denied access to an attorney, knowledge of his wife and children, and no information on the charges against him.

Together in the cell, Orchard described his own confession to Adams, and urged Adams to also confess. In spite of the missed instruction about isolation, McParland reportedly later obtained such a confession from Adams.

Although Steve Adams wasn't allowed to know anything about his wife and children, they weren't far away:

His wife, Annie, and their small children had also been locked in the penitentiary shortly after his arrest for "their own protection," McParland had assured him, hinting that something dreadful might befall them.

Adams' family was brought to the prison "as a means to 'sweat' him."

=== Clarence Darrow intervenes ===
However, Haywood defense attorney Clarence Darrow passed the word that he would defend Adams, and the prisoner immediately recanted. This provoked the prosecution to try Adams in an old murder case for which there was only flimsy evidence. In fact the only significant evidence against Adams was his now-repudiated confession which appeared to have been coerced, as Harry Orchard's confession was coerced. The difference appeared to be that there was clear evidence of Orchard's guilt in the Steunenberg murder, and perhaps in a string of crimes, but little or no evidence linking the others.

Adams had been dining well and provided with fine cigars since signing his confession, as had Harry Orchard. The note announcing that Adams recanted that confession was passed secretly from his jail cell via his wife, Annie, during a visit. The note "delivered a lightning bolt" to the prosecution. It declared,

This is to certify that the statement that I signed was made up by James McParland, detective, and Harry Orchard, alias Tom Hogan. I signed it because I was threatened by Governor Gooding, saying I would be hanged if I did not corroborate Orchard's story against the officers of the federation union of miners. Stephen Adams. Witness: Annie Adams.

Because under Idaho law the testimony of an accomplice must be corroborated by other evidence, the prosecution was counting on Adams' testimony to back up Orchard's confession. Adams' renunciation of his confession greatly weakened the prosecution's case against Haywood, who was found not guilty of the Steunenberg assassination. Pettibone was later also found not guilty in a separate trial. Moyer was released.

Harry Orchard pled guilty of the murder of Frank Steunenberg and sentenced to death, but the sentence was commuted. Orchard would spend the rest of his life in prison.

Some believed that the WFM would retaliate with violence against its enemies in the court cases. This belief was strengthened between the Haywood and Adams trials when ex-sheriff Harvey Brown, who had arrested Adams, was killed by a bomb set to explode when he opened his front gate - very similar to the setup Harry Orchard used to assassinate ex-governor Steunenberg. Another prospective witness in the Adams trial, Archie Phillips, found ten pounds of dynamite behind his house, and fled to Canada to avoid testifying. A number of other prosecution witnesses disappeared or put themselves out of reach of subpoenas.

=== Steve Adams testifies ===
Adams took the witness stand in his own murder trial and testified, in part,

I was taken to the office of the penitentiary and introduced to detective McParland. He told me about "Kelly the Bum" [from McParland's Molly Maguires case] and other men who had turned state's evidence and had been set free. ... McParland told me he wanted to convict [WFM leaders] Moyer, Haywood, Pettibone, St. John, and Simpkins, whom he called 'cut-throats.' If I did not help to convict them, he said, I would be taken back to Colorado and either hanged or mobbed. If I did help, I would only be taken to Colorado as a witness. ... When the confession was made, McParland led me on a step-by-step and showed me all they wanted me to say. ... He wanted the names of the officers of the Federation used as much as possible all through the confession.

McParland's own reports to Idaho Governor Gooding confirm Steve Adams' courtroom statements.

Adams described how information from the question and answer session with McParland, with the Pinkerton detective guiding him from "notes in his pocket," had been typed and returned to him in the form of a narrative document which he was required to sign. The narrative was written in a form that was not consistent with Adams' manner of speech. The document ended with, "I hope that the reign of terror inaugurated by Moyer, Haywood and Pettibone...will cease."

Adams also claimed that Orchard had colluded with McParland to rewrite his own confession because "he could not repeat it the second time anything at all like the first one." However, Fremont Wood, the presiding judge in both the Haywood and Pettibone trials, was highly impressed by the way Orchard held up under prolonged and severe cross-examination in each trial, and believed Orchard's testimony to be true. In Wood's experience, no one could have fabricated such a convoluted story, covering many years, in many locations, and including so many different people, and withstand such thorough cross-examination without materially contradicting himself.

It was L.J. "Jack" Simpkins, also known as J. Simmons, who accompanied Harry Orchard to Caldwell, but left before former governor Stuenenberg was assassinated. Simpkins was the WFM executive board member with responsibility for Idaho. The Pinkerton Agency produced a poster offering a two thousand dollar reward for his arrest, but "some skeptics believed that he was actually a Pinkerton agent provocateur." The allegations appear to have been unfounded.

At one point in the trial of Bill Haywood, McParland thought to frighten Moyer into testifying against Haywood and Pettibone by alleging that Pettibone had urged Orchard and Adams to kill Moyer. The plan was not carried out because McParland came up with an alternative plan. But the alternative scheme failed when Moyer refused to accept the bait.

=== Results of the trials ===
Adams was not found guilty of the murder. He was tried three times altogether, and both trials in Idaho ended in hung juries. Yet he would still face a trial for his life in Colorado.

In the Colorado trial of Steve Adams, attorney Orrin N. Hilton challenged the legality of Adams' confession. McParland testified, and so did the Pinkerton stenographer who took down the confession. The stenographer admitted that McParland directed him what to take down, and what to leave out. The stenographer also confirmed that the confession was not written in language attributable to the defendant, and that sometimes "the substance of the conversation" was added in at a later time. The judge considered the issue overnight. In court the next day, he cited McParland's own testimony about the threat of hanging, and the promise of reward — freedom in return for a confession — which McParland routinely used in obtaining confessions. The judge ruled that the confession was gained illicitly, and the confession itself was barred. The judge ruled, however, that witnesses could attest to what Steve Adams had admitted in their presence. The information provided by the witnesses was contradictory, incomplete, and in some cases appeared to come from newspaper accounts.

In fact, Steve Adams had been accused of involvement in two murders in Colorado, one of which never happened.

In her research for the book The Corpse On Boomerang Road, Telluride's War On Labor 1899-1908, MaryJoy Martin uncovered an elaborate scheme by mine owners and their supporters to blame the Telluride, Colorado, local of the Western Federation of Miners with a string of murders for which there was no evidence. Newspapers printed articles about how the murders allegedly occurred, and named union officials who had committed the crimes. The mine owners, the local sheriff, and James McParland of the Pinkerton Agency used the accusations of murder to publicize an alleged "reign of terror" as a means of destroying the union. One allegedly deceased victim, William J. Barney, was a mine guard who simply had disappeared from his job. In spite of elaborate and detailed chronologies of the murder that were printed in the local newspapers, Barney was still alive. However, this fact wasn't known to the jury sitting in judgment of Steve Adams.

Even so, it wasn't long before the jury decided that testimony by Bulkeley Wells, manager of the Smuggler-Union Mining Company, who had sought the conviction and execution of Western Federation of Miners leaders for years, was not credible. Wells had constructed a scenario under which Steve Adams committed the murder with a shotgun. The jury, mostly area farmers, were intimately familiar with shotguns. The murder scenario, in their judgment, was impossible.

The jury deliberated for an hour before taking a straw poll. They were unanimous; the defendant was not guilty. After three years in prison, Steve Adams was set free.
