= James McParland =

Private detective in the US

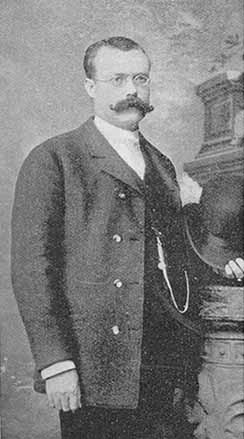
- James McParland circa 1880s
- Born: March 22, 1844; County Armagh, Ireland
- Died: May 18, 1919 (aged 75); Denver, Colorado, United States
- Resting place: Mount Olivet Catholic Cemetery
- Other name: James McKenna
- Occupations: Pinkerton detective, labor spy
- Known for: Private detective and office superintendent for the Pinkerton Detective Agency
- Spouse: Mary Regan

James McParland (Note: There are various spellings of James McParland's name. His stenographer, Morris Friedman, wrote a book about him – as "McParland") (né McParlan; (Note: He "signed his name as 'McParlan' on Pinkerton reports ... He added the 'D' to the end in the 1880s yet dropped it again in 1900, only to restore it in 1901.") 22 March 1844 – 18 May 1919) was an Irish-American private detective and Pinkerton agent.

McParland arrived in New York in 1867. He worked as a laborer, policeman and then in Chicago as a liquor store owner until the Great Chicago Fire of 1871 destroyed his business. He then became a private detective and labor spy, noted for his success against coal mining labor organizations in Pennsylvania.

== Infiltration of the Molly Maguires ==
McParland first came to national attention when, as an undercover operative using the name James McKenna, he infiltrated and helped to dismantle an organization of activist Pennsylvania coal miners called the Molly Maguires. During the 1870s, miners in the region of the anthracite mines lived a life of "bitter, terrible struggle." Wages were low, working conditions were atrocious, and deaths and serious injuries numbered in the hundreds each year. Conditions were certainly ripe for labor unrest:

Labor angrily watched "railway directors (riding) about the country in luxurious private cars proclaiming their inability to pay living wages to hungry working men."

The Molly Maguires were Irish Catholic when there was frequent prejudice against such persons. It was a time of rampant beatings and murders in mining districts, some committed by the Mollies. Franklin B. Gowen, the President of the Philadelphia and Reading Railroad, and of the Philadelphia and Reading Coal and Iron Company, "the wealthiest anthracite coal mine owner in the world", hired Allan Pinkerton's services to deal with the Molly Maguires. Pinkerton assigned McParland to the job. McParland successfully infiltrated the secret organization, becoming a secretary for one of its local groups. McParland turned in reports daily, eventually collecting evidence of murder plots and intrigue, passing this information along to Benjamin Franklin, his Pinkerton manager. He also began working secretly with Robert Linden, a Pinkerton agent assigned to the Coal and Iron Police for the purpose of coordinating the eventual arrest and prosecution of members of the Molly Maguires.

On 10 December 1876, three men and two women with Molly connections were attacked in their house by masked men. One woman in the house, wife of one of the Molly Maguires, was taken outside and shot dead. McParland was outraged that the information he had been providing had found its way into the hands of killers. McParland protested in a letter to his Pinkerton overseer which declared, in part:

Now I wake up this morning to find that I am the murderer of Mrs. McAlister. What had a woman to do with the case – did the [Molly Maguires] in their worst time shoot down women. If I was not here the Vigilante Committee would not know who was guilty and when I find them shooting women in their thirst for blood I hereby tender my resignation to take effect as soon as this message is received. It is not cowardice that makes me resign but just let them have it now I will no longer interfere as I see that one is the same as the other and I am not going to be an accessory to the murder of women and children. I am sure the [Molly Maguires] will not spare the women so long as the Vigilante has shown an example.

McParland was prevailed upon not to resign. Frank Winrich, a first lieutenant with the Pennsylvania State Militia, was arrested as the leader of the attackers, but was released on bail. Then another Molly Maguire, Hugh McGehan, a 21-year-old who had been secretly identified as a killer by McParland, was fired upon and wounded by unknown assailants. Later, the McGehans' home was attacked by gunfire.

Eventually enough evidence was collected on reprisal killings and assassinations that arrests could be made and, based primarily on McParland's testimony, ten Molly Maguires were sent to the gallows. Some writers declare unequivocally that justice was done. Others have argued that,

... punishment had gone too far, and that the guilt of some of the condemned was that of association more than participation and but half established by other condemned men seeking clemency for themselves.

Joseph G. Rayback, author of A History of American Labor, has observed:

The charge has been made that the Molly Maguires episode was deliberately manufactured by the coal operators with the express purpose of destroying all vestiges of unionism in the area ... There is some evidence to support the charge ... the "crime wave" that appeared in the anthracite fields came after the appearance of the Pinkertons, and ... many of the victims of the crimes were union leaders and ordinary miners. The evidence brought against [the defendants], supplied by James McParlan, a Pinkerton, and corroborated by men who were granted immunity for their own crimes, was tortuous and contradictory, but the net effect was damning ... The trial temporarily destroyed the last vestiges of labor unionism in the anthracite area. More important, it gave the public the impression ... that miners were by nature criminal in character ...

== The Valley of Fear: McParland "meets" Holmes ==
Reports of McParland's success against the Molly Maguires came to the attention of Sir Arthur Conan Doyle, author of the Sherlock Holmes detective fiction. Conan Doyle wrote McParland into The Valley of Fear, creating an encounter between the fictional Sherlock Holmes, and a character whose history loosely recalled McParland's experiences with the Molly Maguires.

Conan Doyle had met Allan Pinkerton on an ocean voyage, where the writer became fascinated by the "singular and terrible narrative" of the Molly Maguires. Later, however, "Allan Pinkerton's and Arthur Conan Doyle's friendship ended over the rendition of some Pinkerton exploits in fictional form ..." Patrick Campbell, a relative of one of the executed Mollies, who wrote A Molly Maguire Story, learned from a McParland relative that McParland's two brothers, Edward and Charles, also went undercover against the Mollies. Campbell speculates that the break between Pinkerton and Conan Doyle may have resulted because,

[The McParland character in The Valley of Fear] was portrayed as being very wealthy [suggesting a possible 'pay off' ... and] Pinkerton did not like the fact that [the McParland character] was characterized in the novel as having married a German girl from [the anthracite fields ...] Brother Charles had actually married the German girl, not James, but Pinkerton must have disliked how close the novel was getting to the truth.

== Knights of Labor Railway Strike of 1886 ==
During the Knights of Labor Railway Strike of 1886, McParland worked undercover in Parsons, Kansas for railroad tycoon Jay Gould. McParland was accused of joining in criminal activity with Jacob McLaughlin of the notorious Grand Central Hotel near the railroad yards. Writer Anthony Lukas recorded that:

For years, its staff had preyed on visitors – notably Texas cattlemen who, having driven their herds up the Chisholm Trail to Abilene returned through Parsons with bulging pockets. The hotel provided everything the footloose cowboy or railway man might require: liquor, drugs, gambling, and prostitutes. But once a man had savored those delights, he was likely to find his pockets picked, his horse stolen. If a guest proved recalcitrant, he was chloroformed, butchered, then buried in the basement or thrown in the Neosho River.

McLaughlin and an associate, Wash Bercaw, spent time in the county jail for liquor violations. They reportedly murdered a cellmate by the name of Frank P. Myers (or Myres), a horse thief who had overheard them in the jail, by drowning him in the river. The two were charged with the murder just as troopers brought the strike under control. But the witnesses to the murder changed their stories, apparently due to behind-the-scenes operations by McParland. The witnesses admitted they had been bribed, and went to jail for perjury. E.C. Ward, McLauglin's lawyer, who had offered the bribes, was disbarred. McLaughlin walked free, and many in the community – judges, lawyers, and merchants – apparently shared the view that the perjured testimony was somehow McParland's doing. A meeting chaired by a local Socialist denounced the "infamous" detective. A statement was issued stating that when money could be made,

... he will do anything, no matter how low or vile, to accomplish his purpose ... There is not today, in the United States outside prison walls, a more conscienceless and desperate criminal than McParland.

Lukas wrote: "What lay behind these accusations is difficult to say," and that it is "hard to imagine" how McParland became associated with "a scoundrel like McLaughlin," but "if the story is accurate," he speculated that the connection must have resulted from activities relating to the strike.

Historian and McParland biographer Beau Riffenburgh wrote that McParland's supposed connection with McLaughlin was the invention of sensational journalist George Shoaf and two colleagues at the Kansas socialist publication Appeal to Reason. Shoaf hated McParland passionately for working undercover in the employ of rich capitalists, and launched an "all-out smear campaign" connecting McParland with McLaughlin. Riffenburgh noted that following McLaughlin's trial, two witnesses were convicted of perjury and McLaughlin's lawyer was disbarred, but the report of the three-member commission appointed by the court to investigate the perjury contained no mention of McParland. Riffenburgh concluded:

In a series of outrageous yarns, Shoaf created a story of McParland's involvement at McLaughlin's Grand Central Hotel including cleverly expanding their supposed relationship to include more illegal and immoral activities by McParland. Unfortunately, even though there is no indication of truth in Shoaf's stories, they have occasionally been accepted as accurate.

More than two decades later, McParland would be interrogated about his time in Parsons while under cross-examination by attorney Edmund Richardson. This occurred during the first of three murder trials of Steve Adams, this one taking place in Wallace, Idaho. Immediately after the questioning, the attorney and the detective had a verbal confrontation in the courtroom. An Associated Press writer wrote that spectators cheered the attorney, and hissed McParland. The detective later argued that the newspaper reporter must have been bribed to write such a story.

== Criminal detection ==
In Columbus, Kansas, McParland discovered a conspiracy to dynamite Cherokee County's records vault to hide fraudulent mortgages. McParland helped convict train robber Oliver Curtis Perry. He helped to apprehend a criminal who committed the largest bullion theft in U.S. history – $320,000 in gold from a San Francisco smelting company.

== McParland in Colorado ==
In 1885, the Thiel Detective Agency opened an office in Denver. Allan Pinkerton, who had died two years earlier, left the Pinkerton Detective Agency to his sons. The brothers opened their fourth office in Denver in order to compete with Thiel. They assigned Charles O. Eames to head the Denver office. When it appeared that Eames was running the western branch dishonestly, they assigned McParland to investigate. McParland discovered extensive abuses against clients and against the agency, and reported on them. Everyone was fired except for McParland and Charlie Siringo.

McParland was named superintendent of Pinkerton's Denver office, and of the Pinkerton's western division. In April 1891, Mrs. Josephine Barnaby was murdered by poison. McParland tricked Thomas Thatcher Graves, her accused murderer, into traveling from Providence, Rhode Island, to Denver where he was arrested and convicted of the crime. McParland hired gunman Tom Horn (later executed for murder in Wyoming), who, while working for Pinkerton killed seventeen men, according to a count by Siringo. While Horn had been working for Wyoming cattlemen, "it was the cattle interests who decreed that he must die", probably to keep him from talking.

One of McParland's tasks was infiltrating and disrupting union activities. He successfully placed numerous spies within the Western Federation of Miners (WFM) union, and more into the United Mine Workers. Some of McParland's agents took part in the WFM strike that came to be called the Colorado Labor Wars. One in particular was charged with sabotaging the union's relief program during the strike. Bill Haywood, Secretary Treasurer of the WFM, wrote about the sabotage in his autobiography:

I had been having some difficulty with the relief committee of the Denver smelter men. At first we had been giving out relief at such a rate that I had to tell the chairman that he was providing the smelter men with more than they had had while at work. Then he cut down the rations until the wives of the smelter men began to complain that they were not getting enough to eat. Years later, when his letters were published in The Pinkerton Labor Spy, I discovered that the chairman of the relief committe [sic] was a Pinkerton detective, who was carrying out the instructions of the agency in his methods of handling the relief work, deliberately trying to stir up bad feeling between the strikers and the relief committee.

=== The Steunenberg assassination ===
In 1899, Idaho Governor Frank Steunenberg crushed a rebellion of miners during a labor dispute in Coeur d'Alene. On December 30, 1905, Steunenberg, five years out of office, opened a gate at his home in Caldwell, which set off an explosive device that took his life. A man using the name Tom Hogan had set the bomb; he was born Albert Horsley but best known as Harry Orchard. The killer left evidence in his hotel room, and did not try to flee.

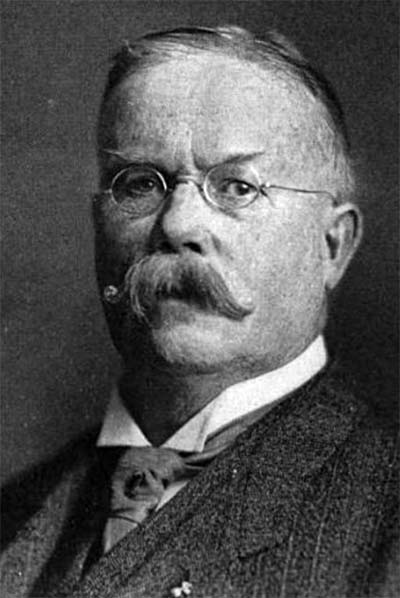
James McParland, from the 1907 book The Confessions and Autobiography of Harry Orchard

After the assassination, Idaho's Chief Justice Charles Stockslager drafted a telegram that invited the Pinkerton Agency to investigate. Idaho Governor Frank Gooding was persuaded to approve the request, and Pinkerton agent McParland soon arrived to lead the investigation. McParland announced his suspicion that Orchard was "the tool of others."

McParland frequently used the expression inner circle to describe a secret cabal in the Western Federation of Miners when pitching Pinkerton's services to mine owners. McParland's stenographer, Morris Friedman, observed that by portraying the WFM in this manner, the Pinkerton office in Denver had generated "as much, and at times even more business than five other offices of the Agency combined."

McParland had Orchard transferred from the Caldwell, Idaho jail to death row in the Boise penitentiary. The move was initially resisted by Judge Smith, who would be responsible for trying the case. The local judge anticipated a successful habeas corpus lawsuit against the tactic. McParland gave him "thirty precedents for the move." However, the sheriff in Caldwell reportedly opposed the move as well. Gooding arranged a meeting between McParland and Chief Justice Stockslager, and then with Judge Smith. Before Smith arrived, McParland declared the county jail insecure, a potential target for dynamite. He also stated the purpose of the move to death row: "After three days I will attempt to get a confession." Chief Justice Stockslager approved of the move. In a pre-arranged plan, the Governor was called out of the room as soon as Judge Smith arrived, leaving McParland and the two judges alone. With the Chief Justice supporting the move to death row, Judge Smith also agreed.

On death row, Orchard was placed under a constant watch, and his food rations were cut. He was incarcerated next to two death row inmates who were awaiting execution themselves. Relays of guards watched him night and day, but never spoke to him. The three-day wait turned into nine days. (Note: The Lukas time-line appears to conflict with this statement.)

On January 22, the hungry prisoner was escorted into the warden's office and left alone with McParland. The two enjoyed a lavish meal followed by fine cigars. McParland threatened Orchard with immediate hanging, and said that he could avoid that fate only if he testified against leaders of the WFM. McParland allayed Orchard's skepticism by telling him about "Kelly the Bum", a confessed murderer who became a prosecution witness in the Molly Maguires cases.

McParland claimed "Kelly" not only had received freedom as part of the deal, but he had been given "one thousand dollars to subsidize a new life abroad". McParland dismissed the possibility that Orchard would face charges in Colorado if allowed to go free in Idaho. McParland had offered a stark choice: an immediate visit to the gallows, or better treatment for the prisoner with the possibility of freedom, a possible financial reward, and the gratitude of the state of Idaho. Orchard was known to Charles Moyer, having once acted as his bodyguard on a trip from Denver to Telluride. Orchard had also met Bill Haywood. In 1899 Orchard was at the scene of the labor unrest in Coeur d'Alene when Steunenberg had severely punished the union miners for an act of violence. He chose to cooperate. Orchard was transferred from death row to a private bungalow in the prison yard. He was provided with special meals, new clothing, spending money, his favorite cigars, and a library of religious tracts. The current governor of Idaho stopped by to shake his hand and congratulate him on cooperating.

McParland had Western Federation of Miners leaders Bill Haywood, Charles Moyer, and George Pettibone arrested in Colorado. In his book Roughneck, writer Peter Carlson wrote that the extradition papers falsely claimed that the three men had been present at Steunenberg's murder. Carlson described the arrest across state lines as a "kidnapping scheme." However, under Idaho law, conspirators were considered to be present at the scene of the crime. The extradition was done with the cooperation and involvement of the Colorado authorities, and was later upheld by the US Supreme Court, with one dissent.

=== The Steunenberg trials ===
McParland rounded up potential witnesses, assembled evidence, checked out potential jurors, and "leaked information that would tarnish the reputations of the defendants and their attorneys." McParland placed a spy, "Operative 21", on the defense team. The spy operated as a jury canvasser, and may have been instructed to provide the defense with erroneous reports of the preferences of potential jurors. However, the spy was discovered.

McParland sought to bolster Orchard's testimony by forcing another WFM miner, Steve Adams, to turn state's evidence. McParland used the same method for eliciting a confession from Adams as he had on Orchard: he told Adams he was merely a "tool," and told him he "would be forgiven his sins," if he confessed. With his wife and children also confined in the Idaho prison, allegedly for their own protection, Adams signed a confession, then later recanted. McParland sought leverage over Adams to force him to re-affirm the confession. Charges against Adams for several murders resulted in two hung juries and one acquittal. As a result of Adams' first trial, in which he was defended by attorneys Clarence Darrow and Edmund F. Richardson, details of McParland's coercive treatment of witnesses when seeking a confession were revealed on the witness stand. McParland had contracted to provide Pinkerton services for Bulkeley Wells, the president and manager of the Smuggler-Union Mining Company in Telluride, Colorado. Together with Wells and others, McParland planned to have Adams charged with involvement after-the-fact in the murder of mine bricklayer William J. Barney, who had disappeared one week after accepting the position as a guard at the Smuggler-Union mine. There was one difficulty with the accusation: William J. Barney hadn't been murdered; in fact, he was very much alive.

McParland tried to turn conspiracy defendant Moyer against co-defendants Haywood and Pettibone by having a sheriff claim Pettibone, Adams, and Orchard were plotting to kill Moyer, but that plan wasn't put into action. A slightly different scheme was tried to split the trio, but Moyer didn't take the bait.

At the Haywood trial, which was funded, in part, by direct contributions from the Ceour d'Alene District Mine Owners' Association to prosecuting attorneys, the only evidence against the WFM leader was Harry Orchard's testimony. Orchard confessed to acting as a paid informant for the Mine Owners' Association He reportedly told a companion, G.L. Brokaw, that he had been a Pinkerton employee for some time. and a bigamist. He admitted to abandoning wives in Canada and Cripple Creek. He had burned businesses for the insurance money in Cripple Creek and Canada.

Orchard had burglarized a railroad depot, rifled a cash register, stolen sheep, and had made plans to kidnap children over a debt. He also sold fraudulent insurance policies. To satisfy McParland, Orchard had signed a confession to a series of bombings and shootings which had killed at least seventeen men, all of which he blamed on the Western Federation of Miners. The original confession was never made public. (Note: This statement may be questionable; Horan & Swiggett (1951), p. 302 state that copies of the confession were sent to various places, including Governor Gooding, State Attorney Hawley, and William E. Borah.) but a more comprehensive version released in 1907 included many pages of incriminating allegations.

Although at first his testimony on the witness stand in the Bill Haywood trial seemed plausible, the defense pointed out some significant contradictions. Orchard claimed his instructions came from Haywood and Moyer, but the authors of The Pinkerton Story observe:

It was impossible to establish beyond a reasonable doubt through any witness, except Orchard's wife, second and bigamous, the fact of private meetings between him and Haywood.

The defense called two surprise witnesses – Morris Friedman, McParland's private stenographer until 1905, who testified about Pinkerton's practices of infiltration and sabotage of the WFM; and McParland's brother, Edward, who had been a shoemaker in the Cripple Creek District during the Colorado Labor Wars. Edward testified that he had been working at his cobbler's bench in Victor when national guardsmen:

... took him in custody, striking him several times with their gun butts for moving too slowly. After days in a Cripple Creek bullpen, he and seventy-seven others were put on a train and deported to neighboring Kansas ...

The appearance of his brother Edward was intended "simply to embarrass" the detective, for it recounted "the imperial style of the Peabody administration in Colorado, with which McParland and the Pinkertons had been closely associated."

The majority of jurors in the Haywood trial found Orchard not to be a credible witness, and Haywood was acquitted. In a separate trial for George Pettibone, the defense team declined to argue the case, resting upon a not guilty plea. Pettibone was also acquitted. Charges against Moyer were dropped. After the cases against the WFM leaders failed, Orchard was tried alone for Steunenberg's murder, was found guilty, and was sentenced to death. However, the sentence was commuted to life, and he lived out the rest of his life in his prison bungalow.

== Competitive practices ==
McParland was a rival to Wilson S. Swain, northwestern manager of the Thiel Detective Agency. During the Stuenenberg investigation, Swain set up shop in Caldwell, Idaho, intimating to county authorities and to the governor that he'd been hired by the mine owners to investigate the crime. When he later presented his bill to the Canyon County Commissioners, they felt that they had been conned. Meanwhile, McParland was interviewed for the investigation by the governor. McParland sought to further undermine the competition:

[McParland] never lost an opportunity to remind [Idaho Governor] Gooding that Swain had committed a "cold-blooded murder" on Denver's Larimer Street twenty years before. More often he worked surreptitiously, passing stories he knew would be repeated, impugning Swain's investigative skills, ridiculing his minions, suggesting [Swain] was in league with the [Western Federation of Miners]. He'd taken care of Swain all right, he told his superiors, "but done it in such a way that I am not suspected."

The rivalry was significant because, while the Pinkerton agency was associated with Colorado's mine owners, the Thiel agency had been closely tied to Idaho's mine owners. With the subsequent dismissal of the Thiel agency, Colorado's mine owners gained control of the Idaho investigation.

== Allegations ==
When "The Cowboy Detective" Charlie Siringo wrote his memoirs about working for the Pinkerton Agency, he accused McParland of ordering him to commit voter fraud in the re-election attempt of Colorado Governor James Peabody.

Charles A. Siringo, a Pinkerton who had worked for more than twenty years as an operative, detective, and spy, and McParland's personal bodyguard in Idaho, declared the agency "corrupt". [His 1915 book charged the Pinkertons with election fraud, jury tampering, fabricated confessions, false witnesses, bribery, intimidation, and hiring killers for its clients ... Documents and time sustained many of his assertions ...]

The Pinkerton Agency suppressed Siringo's books, in one case with an accusation of libel. MaryJoy Martin, author of The Corpse On Boomerang Road wrote:

McParland would stop at nothing to take down [unions such as the Western Federation of Miners] because he believed his authority came from "Divine Providence". To Carry out God's Will meant he was free to break laws and lie until every man he judged evil was hanging on the gallows. Since his days in Pennsylvania he was comfortable lying under oath. In the Haywood and Adams trials, he often lied, even claiming he had never joined the Ancient Order of Hibernians. Documents showed he had.

== Death ==
McParland died on 18 May 1919 in Denver's Mercy Hospital. He left a widow, Mary, but no children. MaryJoy Martin wrote:

The Denver Post, Rocky Mountain News, and the Denver Catholic Register filled columns in tribute, recounting his Molly Maguire tales and Harry Orchard triumph, tucking in fiction and numerous lies along the way. It mattered little, since the man had become a legend.

== See also ==
- Anti-union violence

For Molly Maguires history:

- Molly Maguires
- Franklin B. Gowen

For western mine wars:

- Harry Orchard, convicted WFM murderer of former Idaho governor
- Frank Steunenberg, murdered ex-governor of Idaho
- Steve Adams, accused WFM accomplice
- Charles Moyer, WFM union leader accused of conspiracy to murder
- George Pettibone, WFM union supporter accused of conspiracy to murder
- Frank R. Gooding, Idaho Governor during Steunenberg murder and trials
- Charlie Siringo, Pinkerton agent and hired gunman
- Coeur d'Alene, Idaho labor confrontation of 1899, one alleged reason for the Steunenberg murder
