= Molly Maguires =

19th-century secret society in Ireland

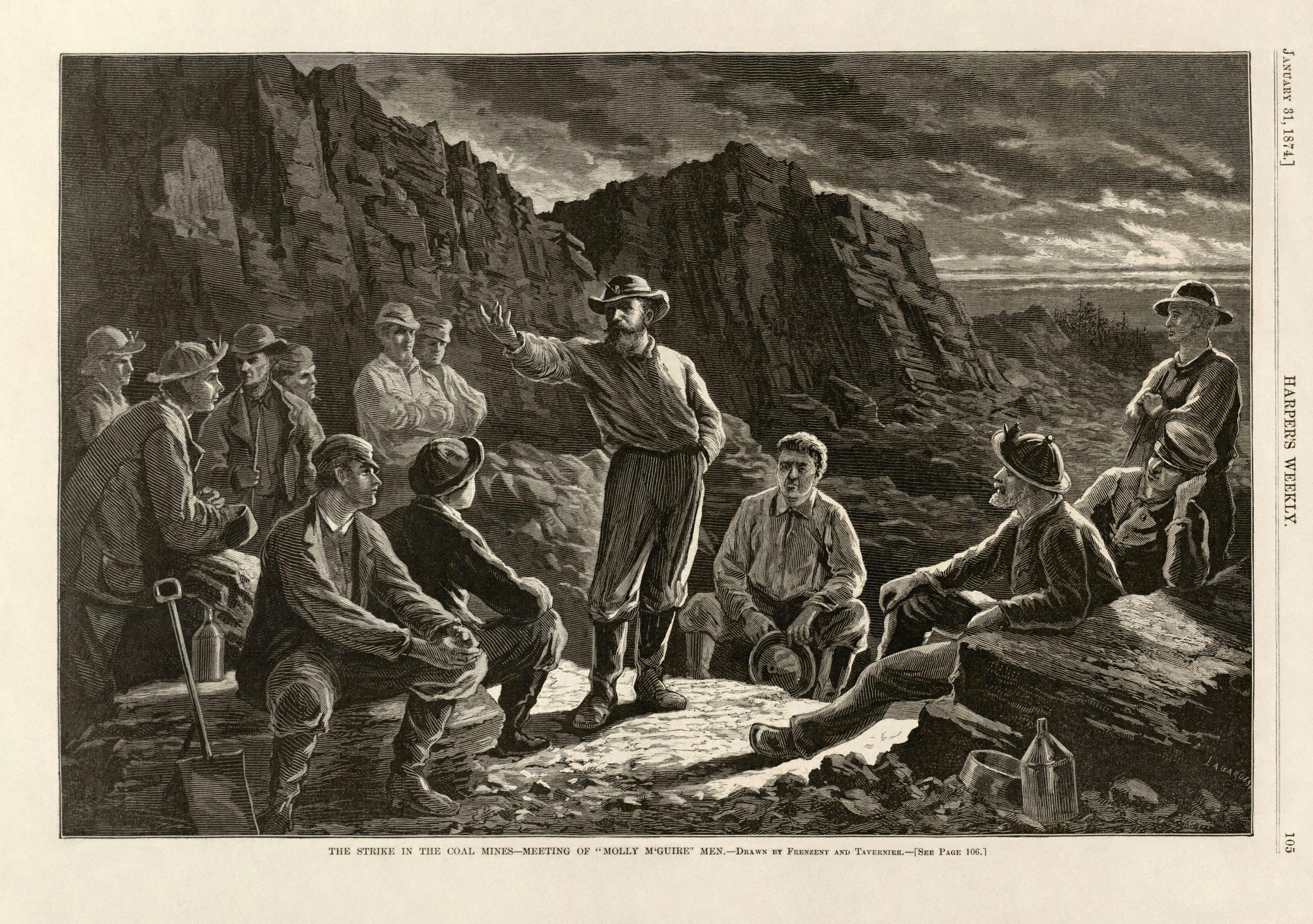
Molly Maguires meeting to discuss strikes in the Pennsylvania coal mines, depicted in an 1874 illustration in Harper's Weekly

It is alleged that the Molly Maguires was an Irish 19th-century secret society active in Ireland, Liverpool, and parts of the eastern United States, best known for their activism among Irish-American and Irish immigrant coal miners in Pennsylvania. After a series of often violent conflicts, twenty suspected members of the Molly Maguires were convicted of murder and other crimes and were executed by hanging in 1877 and 1878. This history remains part of local Pennsylvania lore and the actual facts are much debated among historians.

== Ireland ==
The Molly Maguires originated in Ireland, where secret societies with names such as Whiteboys and Peep o' Day Boys were common beginning in the 18th century and through most of the 19th century. In some areas the terms Ribbonmen and Molly Maguires were both used for similar activism but at different times. The main distinction between the two appears to be that the Ribbonmen were regarded as "secular, cosmopolitan, and proto-nationalist", with the Molly Maguires considered "rural, local, and Gaelic".

Agrarian rebellion in Ireland can be traced to local concerns and grievances relating to land usage, particularly as traditional socioeconomic practices such as small-scale potato cultivation were supplanted by the fencing and pasturing of land (known as enclosure). Agrarian resistance often took the form of fence destruction, night-time ploughing of croplands that had been converted to pasture, and killing, mutilating, or driving off livestock. In areas where the land had long been dedicated to small-scale, growing-season leases of farmland, called conacre, opposition was conceived as "retributive justice" that was intended "to correct transgressions against traditional moral and social codes".

The victims of agrarian violence were frequently Irish land agents, middlemen, and tenants. Merchants and millers were often threatened or attacked if their prices were high. Landlords' agents were threatened, beaten, and assassinated. New tenants on lands secured by evictions also became targets. Local leaders were reported to have sometimes dressed as women, i.e., as mothers begging for food for their children. The leader might approach a storekeeper and demand a donation of flour or groceries. If the storekeeper failed to provide, the Mollies would enter the store and take what they wanted, warning the owner of dire consequences if the incident was reported.

While the Whiteboys were known to wear white linen frocks over their clothing, the Mollies blackened their faces with burnt cork. There are similarities—particularly in face-blackening and in the donning of women's garments—with the practice of mummery, in which festive days were celebrated by mummers who travelled from door to door demanding food, money, or drink as payment for performing. The Threshers, the Peep o' Day Boys, the Lady Rocks (deriving from Captain Rock and the Rockite movement), and the Lady Clares also sometimes disguised themselves as women. Similar imagery was used during the Rebecca Riots in Wales.

British and Irish newspapers reported about the Mollies in Ireland in the nineteenth century. Thomas Campbell Foster in The Times on 25 August 1845 traced the commencement of "Molly Maguireism" to Lord Lorton ejecting tenants in Ballinamuck, County Longford, in 1835. An "Address of 'Molly Maguire' to her children" containing twelve rules was published in Freeman's Journal on 7 July 1845. The person making the address claimed to be "Molly Maguire" of "Maguire's Grove, Parish of Cloone", in County Leitrim. The rules advised Mollies about how they should conduct themselves in land disputes and were an attempt to direct the movement's activities:

- Keep strictly to the land question, by allowing no landlord more than fair value for his tenure.
- No Rent to be paid until harvest.
- Not even then without an abatement, where the land is too high.
- No undermining of tenants, nor bailiff's fees to be paid.
- No turning out of tenants, unless two years rent due before ejectment served.
- Assist to the utmost of your power the good landlord, in getting his rents.
- Cherish and respect the good landlord, and good agent.
- Keep from travelling by night.
- Take no arms by day, or by night, from any man, as from such acts a deal of misfortune springs, having, I trust you have, more arms than you ever will have need for.
- Avoid coming in contact with either the military, or police; they are only doing what they cannot help.
- For my sake, then, no distinction to any man, on account of his religion; his acts alone you are to look to.
- Let bygones be bygones, unless in a very glaring case; but watch for the time to come.

== Liverpool ==
The Molly Maguires were also active in Liverpool, England, where many Irish people settled in the 19th century, and many more passed through Liverpool on their way to the United States or Canada. The Mollies are first mentioned in Liverpool in an article in The Liverpool Mercury newspaper on 10 May 1853. The newspaper reported that, "a regular faction fight took place in Marybone amongst the Irish residents in that district. About 200 men and women assembled, who were divided into four parties—the 'Molly Maguires', the 'Kellys', the 'Fitzpatricks' and the 'Murphys'—the greater number of whom were armed with sticks and stones. The three latter sections were opposed to the 'Molly Maguires' and the belligerents were engaged in hot conflict for about half an hour, when the guardians of the peace interfered."

Later Liverpool newspaper articles from the same time period refer to assaults by Mollies against other Irish Liverpudlians. The "Molly Maguire club" or "Molly's Club" was described as a "mutual defence association" that had been "formed for the mutual assistance of the members when they got into 'trouble', each member subscribing to the funds". Patrick Flynn was the secretary of the Liverpool Molly Maguire Clubs in the 1850s and their headquarters was in an alehouse in Alexander Pope Street also known as Sawney Pope Street. The Liverpool branch of the Molly Maguires was known for its gangsterism rather than any genuine concern for the welfare of Irish people.

== United States ==
Location of the Coal Region counties in Northeastern Pennsylvania where the Molly Maguires were active

The Mollies are believed to have been present in the anthracite coal fields of Pennsylvania in the United States since at least the Panic of 1873 until becoming largely inactive following a series of arrests, trials and executions, between 1876 and 1878. Members of the Mollies were accused of murder, arson, kidnapping, and other crimes, in part based on allegations by Franklin B. Gowen and the testimony of a Pinkerton detective, James McParland (also known as "James McKenna"), a native of County Armagh, Ireland. Fellow prisoners testified against the defendants, who were arrested by the Coal and Iron Police. Gowen acted as a prosecutor in some of the trials.

The trusts seem to have focused almost exclusively upon the Molly Maguires for criminal prosecution. Information passed from the Pinkerton detective, intended only for the detective agency and their client—the most powerful industrialist of the region—was also provided to vigilantes who ambushed and murdered miners suspected of being Molly Maguires, as well as their families. Molly Maguire history is sometimes presented as the prosecution of an underground movement that was motivated by personal vendettas, and sometimes as a struggle between organized labour and powerful industrial forces. Whether membership in the Mollies' society overlapped with union membership to any appreciable extent remains open to conjecture.

Some historians (such as Philip Rosen, former curator of the Holocaust Awareness Museum of the Delaware Valley) believe that Irish immigrants brought a form of the Molly Maguires organization into America in the 19th century, and continued its activities as a clandestine society. They were located in a section of the anthracite coal fields dubbed the Coal Region, which included the Pennsylvania counties of Lackawanna, Luzerne, Columbia, Schuylkill, Carbon, and Northumberland. Irish miners in this organization employed the tactics of intimidation and violence used against Irish landlords during the "Land Wars" yet again in violent confrontations against the anthracite, or hard coal, mining companies in the 19th century.

=== Historians' disagreement ===
A legal self-help organization for Irish immigrants existed in the form of the Ancient Order of Hibernians (AOH), but it is generally accepted that the Mollies existed as a secret organization in Pennsylvania, and used the AOH as a front. However, Joseph Rayback's 1966 volume, A History of American Labor, claims the "identity of the Molly Maguires has never been proved". Rayback writes:

The charge has been made that the Molly Maguires episode was deliberately manufactured by the coal operators with the express purpose of destroying all vestiges of unionism in the area... There is some evidence to support the charge... the "crime wave" that appeared in the anthracite fields came after the appearance of the Pinkertons, and... many of the victims of the crimes were union leaders and ordinary miners. The evidence brought against [the defendants], supplied by James McParlan, a Pinkerton, and corroborated by men who were granted immunity for their own crimes, was tortuous and contradictory, but the net effect was damning... The trial temporarily destroyed the last vestiges of labor unionism in the anthracite area. More important, it gave the public the impression... that miners were by nature criminal in character....

Authors who accept the existence of the Mollies as a violent and destructive group acknowledge a significant scholarship that questions the entire history. In The Pinkerton Story, authors James D. Horan and Howard Swiggett write sympathetically about the detective agency and its mission to bring the Mollies to justice. They observe:

The difficulty of achieving strict and fair accuracy in relation to the Mollie Maguires is very great. Sensible men have held there never even was such an organization... We do believe, however, that members of a secret organization, bound to each other by oath, used the facilities and personnel of the organization to carry out personal vendettas...

=== History ===
During the mid-19th century, hard coal mining came to dominate northeastern Pennsylvania, a region already deforested twice over to feed America's growing need for energy. By the 1870s, powerful financial syndicates controlled the railroads and the coalfields. Coal companies had begun to recruit immigrants from overseas willing to work for less than the prevailing local wages paid to American-born employees, luring them with "promises of fortune-making". Herded into freight trains by the hundreds, these workers often replaced English-speaking miners who, according to labour historian George Korson:

...were compelled to give way in one coal field after another, either abandoning the industry altogether for other occupations or else retreating, like the vanishing American Indian, westward...

The immigrant workers:

...faced constant hazards from violation of safety precautions, such as they were. Injuries and deaths in mine disasters, frequently reported in the newspapers, shocked the nation.

About 22,000 coal miners worked in Schuylkill County, Pennsylvania. 5,500 of these were children between the ages of seven and sixteen years, who earned between one and three dollars a week separating slate from coal. Injured miners, or those too old to work at the face, were assigned to picking slate at the "breakers" where the coal was crushed into a manageable size. Thus, many of the elderly miners finished their mining days as they had begun in their youth. The miners lived a life of "bitter, terrible struggle".

==== Disaster strikes ====
Wages were low, working conditions were atrocious, and deaths and serious injuries numbered in the hundreds each year. On 6 September 1869, a fire at the Avondale Mine in Luzerne County, took the lives of 110 coal miners. The families blamed the coal company for failing to finance a secondary exit for the mine.

...the mine owners without one single exception had refused over the years to install emergency exits, ventilating and pumping systems, or to make provision for sound scaffolding. In Schuylkill County alone 566 miners had been killed and 1,655 had been seriously injured over a seven year period...

The miners faced a speedup system that was exhausting. In its November 1877 issue, Harper's New Monthly Magazine published an interviewer's comments: "A miner tells me that he often brought his food uneaten out of the mine from want of time; for he must have his car loaded when the driver comes for it, or lose one of the seven car-loads which form his daily work."

As the bodies of the miners were brought up from the Avondale Mine disaster, John Siney, head of the Workingmen's Benevolent Association (WBA), climbed onto a wagon to speak to the thousands of miners who had arrived from surrounding communities:

Men, if you must die with your boots on, die for your families, your homes, your country, but do not longer consent to die, like rats in a trap, for those who have no more interest in you than in the pick you dig with.

Siney asked the miners to join the union, and thousands did so that day. Some miners faced additional burdens of prejudice and persecution. In the 1840s, 1850s, and 1860s, some 20,000 Irish workers had arrived in Schuylkill County. It was a time of rampant beatings and murders in the mining district.

==== Panic of 1873 ====
The period between 1873 and 1879 (see Panic of 1873) was marked by one of the worst depressions in the nation's history, caused by economic overexpansion, a stock market crash, and a decrease in the money supply. By 1877 an estimated one-fifth of the nation's workingmen were completely unemployed, two-fifths worked no more than six or seven months a year, and only one-fifth had full-time jobs. Labor organizers angrily watched railway directors riding about the country in luxurious private cars while proclaiming their inability to pay living wages to hungry working men.

==== Mine owners move against the union ====
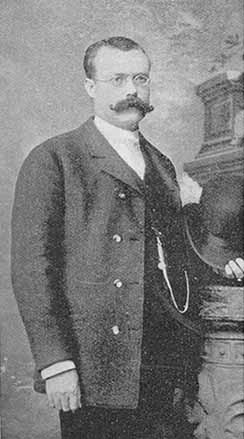
Pinkerton Detective Agency detective James McParland, in the 1880s

Franklin B. Gowen, the president of the Philadelphia and Reading Railway, and of the Philadelphia and Reading Coal and Iron Company and "the wealthiest anthracite coal mine owner in the world", hired Allan Pinkerton's services to deal with the Mollies. Pinkerton selected James McParland (sometimes called McParlan), a native of County Armagh, to go undercover against the Mollies. Using the alias "James McKenna", he made Shenandoah his headquarters and claimed to have become a trusted member of the organization. His assignment was to collect evidence of murder plots and intrigue, passing this information along to his Pinkerton manager. He also began working secretly with a Pinkerton agent assigned to the Coal and Iron Police for the purpose of coordinating the eventual arrest and prosecution of members of the Molly Maguires. Although there had been fifty "inexplicable murders" between 1863 and 1867 in Schuylkill County, progress in the investigations was slow. There was "a lull in the entire area, broken only by minor shootings". McParland wrote: I am sick and tired of this thing. I seem to make no progress.

The union had grown powerful; thirty thousand members—eighty-five percent of Pennsylvania's anthracite miners—had joined. But Gowen had built a combination of his own, bringing all of the mine operators into an employers' association known as the Anthracite Board of Trade. In addition to the railroad, Gowen owned two-thirds of the coal mines in southeastern Pennsylvania. He was a risk-taker and an ambitious man. Gowen decided to force a strike and showdown.

==== Union, Mollies, and Ancient Order of Hibernians (AOH) ====
One of the burning questions for modern scholars is the relationship between the Workingmen's Benevolent Association (WBA), the Mollies, and their alleged cover organization, the Ancient Order of Hibernians. Historian Kevin Kenny notes that the convicted men were all members of the AOH. But "the Molly Maguires themselves left virtually no evidence of their existence, let alone their aims and motivation." Relying upon his personal knowledge before commencing an investigation, McParland believed that the Molly Maguires, under pressure for their activities, had taken the new name, "The Ancient Order of Hibernians" (AOH). After beginning his investigation, he estimated that there were about 450 members of the AOH in Schuylkill County.

While Kenny observes that the AOH was "a peaceful fraternal society", he does note that in the 1870s the Pinkerton Agency identified a correlation between the areas of AOH membership in Pennsylvania, and the corresponding areas in Ireland from which those particular Irish immigrants emigrated. The violence-prone areas of Ireland corresponded to areas of violence in the Pennsylvania coalfields.

In his book Big Trouble, which traces McParland's history, writer J. Anthony Lukas has written: "The WBA was run by Lancashire men adamantly opposed to violence. But [Gowen] saw an opportunity to paint the union with the Molly brush, which he did in testimony before a state investigating committee ... 'I do not charge this Workingmen's Benevolent Association with it, but I say there is an association which votes in secret, at night, that men's lives shall be taken ... I do not blame this association, but I blame another association for doing it; and it happens that the only men who are shot are the men who dare disobey the mandates of the Workingmen's Benevolent Association.'"

Of the 450 AOH members that Pinkerton Agent McParland estimated were in Schuylkill County, about 400 belonged to the union. Molly Maguireism and full-fledged trade unionism represented fundamentally different modes of organization and protest. Kenny noted that one contemporary organization, the Pennsylvania Bureau of Industrial Statistics, clearly distinguished between the union and the violence attributed to the Molly Maguires. Their reports indicate that violence could be traced to the time of the Civil War, but that in the five-year existence of the WBA, "the relations existing between employers and employees" had greatly improved. The Bureau concluded that the union had brought an end to the "carnival of crime". Kenny notes the leaders of the WBA were "always unequivocally opposed" to the Molly Maguires.

Most Irish mine workers belonged to the WBA and roughly half the officers of its executive board in 1872 bore Irish names. But, in addition to the WBA, there existed a loosely organized body of men called the Molly Maguires, whose membership appears to have been exclusively Irish ... Both modes of organization... tried to improve conditions of life and labor in the anthracite region. But the strategy of the trade union was indirect, gradual, peaceful, and systematically organized across the anthracite region, while that of the Molly Maguires was direct, violent, sporadic, and confined to a specific locality.

Kenny notes there were frequent tensions between miners of English and Welsh descent, who held the majority of skilled positions, and the mass of unskilled Irish labourers. However, in spite of such differences, the WBA offered a solution, and for the most part "did a remarkable job" in overcoming such differences.

All mine workers, regardless of craft status, national origin, and religious background, were eligible to join the WBA. As a result, many of its rank and file were members of the AOH, and there is evidence that some disgruntled trade union members favored violence against the wishes of their leaders, especially in the climactic year of 1875. But there were no Mollys among the leaders of the WBA, who took every opportunity they could to condemn the Molly Maguires and the use of violence as a strategy in the labor struggle. While the membership of the trade union and the secret society undoubtedly overlapped to some extent, they must be seen as ideologically and institutionally distinct.

==== Vigilante justice ====
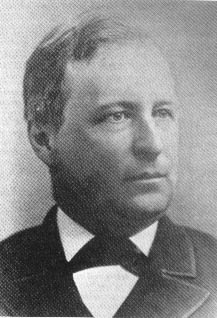
Franklin B. Gowen, District Attorney for Schuylkill County, Pennsylvania and president of the Philadelphia and Reading Railroad and Philadelphia and Reading Coal and Iron Company

F.P. Dewees, a contemporary and a confidant of Gowen, wrote that, by 1873, "Mr. Gowen was fully impressed with the necessity of lessening the overgrown power of the 'Labor Union' and exterminating if possible the Molly Maguires." In December 1874, Gowen led the other coal operators to announce a twenty percent pay cut. The miners decided to strike on 1 January 1875.

Edward Coyle, a leader of the union, and of the Ancient Order of Hibernians, was murdered in March. Another member of the AOH was shot and killed by the Modocs (a rival Welsh gang operating in the anthracite coalfields) led by one Bradley, a mine superintendent. Patrick Vary, a mine boss, fired into a group of miners and, according to the later boast by Gowen, as the miners "fled they left a long trail of blood behind them". At Tuscarora, a meeting of miners was attacked; one miner was killed and several others wounded.

A Pinkerton agent, Robert J. Linden, was brought in to support McParland while serving with the Coal and Iron Police. On 29 August 1875, Allan Pinkerton wrote a letter to George Bangs, Pinkerton's general superintendent, recommending vigilante actions against the Molly Maguires: "The M.M.'s are a species of Thugs... Let Linden get up a vigilance committee. It will not do to get many men, but let him get those who are prepared to take fearful revenge on the M.M.'s. I think it would open the eyes of all the people and then the M.M.'s would meet with their just deserts." On 10 December 1875, three men and two women were attacked in their home by masked men. Author Anthony Lukas wrote that the attack seemed "to reflect the strategy outlined in Pinkerton's memo".

The victims had been secretly identified by McParland as Mollies. One of the men was killed in the house, and the other two supposed Mollies were wounded but able to escape. A woman, the wife of one of the reputed Mollies, was assassinated.

McParland was outraged that the information he had been providing had found its way into the hands of indiscriminate killers. When McParland heard details of the attack at the house, he protested in a letter to his Pinkerton supervisor. He did not object that Mollies might be assassinated as a result of his labor spying—they "got their just deserving". McParland resigned when it became apparent the vigilantes were willing to commit the "murder of women and children", whom he deemed innocent victims. His letter stated:

Friday: This morning at 8 A.M. I heard that a crowd of masked men had entered Mrs. O'Donnell's house ... and had killed James O'Donnell alias Friday, Charles O'Donnell and James McAllister, also Mrs. McAllister whom they took out of the house and shot ... Now as for the O'Donnells I am satisfied they got their just deserving. I reported what those men were. I give all information about them so clear that the courts could have taken hold of their case at any time but the witnesses were too cowardly to do it. I have also in the interests of God and humanity notified you months before some of those outrages were committed still the authorities took no hold of the matter. Now I wake up this morning to find that I am the murderer of Mrs. McAllister. What had a woman to do with the case—did the [Molly Maguires] in their worst time shoot down women. If I was not here the Vigilante Committee would not know who was guilty and when I find them shooting women in their thirst for blood I hereby tender my resignation to take effect as soon as this message is received. It is not cowardice that makes me resign but just let them have it now I will no longer interfere as I see that one is the same as the other and I am not going to be an accessory to the murder of women and children. I am sure the [Molly Maguires] will not spare the women so long as the Vigilante has shown an example.

There appears to be an error in the detective's report, which also constituted his resignation letter, of the vigilante incident: he failed to convey the correct number of deaths. Two of the three men "were wounded but able to escape". In the note, McParland reported that these two had been killed by vigilantes. Such notes, possibly containing erroneous or as-yet-unverified information, were forwarded daily by Pinkerton operatives. The content was routinely made available to Pinkerton clients in typed reports. Pinkerton detective reports now in the manuscripts collection at the Lackawanna County Historical Society reveal that Pinkerton had been spying on miners for the mine owners in Scranton. Pinkerton operatives were required to send a report each day. The daily reports were typed by staff, and conveyed to the client for a ten-dollar fee. Such a process was relied upon to "warrant the continuance of the operative's services".

McParland believed his daily reports had been made available to the anti-Molly vigilantes. Benjamin Franklin, McParland's Pinkerton supervisor, declared himself "anxious to satisfy [McParland] that [the Pinkerton Agency has] nothing to do with [the vigilante murders.]" McParland was prevailed upon not to resign. Frank Wenrich, a first lieutenant with the Pennsylvania National Guard, was arrested as the leader of the vigilante attackers, but released on bail. Another miner, Hugh McGeehan, a 21-year-old who had been secretly identified as a killer by McParland, was fired upon and wounded by unknown assailants. Later, the McGeehan family's house was attacked by gunfire.

==== The strike fails ====
The union was nearly broken by the imprisonment of its leadership and by attacks conducted by vigilantes against the strikers. Gowen "deluged the newspapers with stories of murder and arson" committed by the Molly Maguires. The press produced stories of strikes in Illinois, in Jersey City, and in the Ohio minefields, all inspired by the Mollies. The stories were widely believed. In Schuylkill County, the striking miners and their families were starving to death. A striker wrote to a friend: Since I last saw you, I have buried my youngest child, and on the day before its death there was not one bit of victuals in the house with six children.

Andrew Roy in his book A History of the Coal Miners of the United States noted:

Hundreds of families rose in the morning to breakfast on a crust of bread and a glass of water, who did not know where a bite of dinner was to come from. Day after day, men, women, and children went to the adjoining woods to dig roots and pick up herbs to keep body and soul together...

After six months, the strike was defeated and the miners returned to work, accepting the 20 percent cut in pay. But miners belonging to the Ancient Order of Hibernians continued the fight. McParland acknowledged increasing support for the Mollies in his reports: Men, who last winter would not notice a Molly Maguire, are now glad to take them by the hand and make much of them. If the bosses exercise tyranny over the men they appear to look to the association for help. Lukas observes that the defeat was humiliating, and traces the roots of violence by the Mollies in the aftermath of the failed strike: Judges, lawyers, and policemen were overwhelmingly Welsh, German, or English ... When the coalfield Irish sought to remedy their grievances through the courts, they often met delays, obfuscation, or doors slammed in their faces. No longer looking to these institutions for justice, they turned instead to the Mollies.... Before the summer was over, six men—all Welsh or German—paid with their lives.

Authors Richard O. Boyer and Herbert M. Morais argue that the killings were not one-sided:

Militant miners often disappeared, their bodies sometimes being found later in deserted mine shafts.

==== McParland penetrates the "inner circle" ====
After months of little progress, McParland reported some plans by the "inner circle". Gomer James, a Welshman, had shot and wounded one of the Mollies, and plans were formulated for a revenge killing. But the wheels of revenge were grinding slowly. And there was other violence:

November was a bloody month what with the miners on strike.... In the three days around November 18, a Mollie was found dead in the streets of Carbondale, north of Scranton, a man had his throat cut, an unidentified man was crucified in the woods, a mining boss mauled, a man murdered in Scranton, and three men of [another Molly Maguires group] were guilty of a horror against an old woman, and an attempt to assassinate a Mollie by the name of Dougherty, followed and [Dougherty] at once demanded the murder of W. M. Thomas, whom he blamed for the attempt.

On the last day of the month, with Gowen's strikebreakers pouring in, the Summit telegraph office was burned, a train derailed, and McParland advised [his Pinkerton supervisor] to send in uniformed police to preserve order.

A plan to destroy a railroad bridge was abandoned due to the presence of outsiders. The Irish miners had been forbidden to set foot in the public square in Mahanoy City, and a plan to occupy it by force of arms was considered and then abandoned. In the meantime, a messenger reported that [W.M.] Thomas, the would-be killer of one of the Mollies, had been killed in the stable where he worked. McParland himself had been asked to supply the hidden killers with food and whiskey, according to the detective. According to Horan and Swiggett:

The probability is that as a man, "Bully Bill Thomas", a Welshman, was no better than his enemies, but he was remarkable in other ways. His killers, leaving him for dead in the stable door, were not aware until two days later that he had survived.

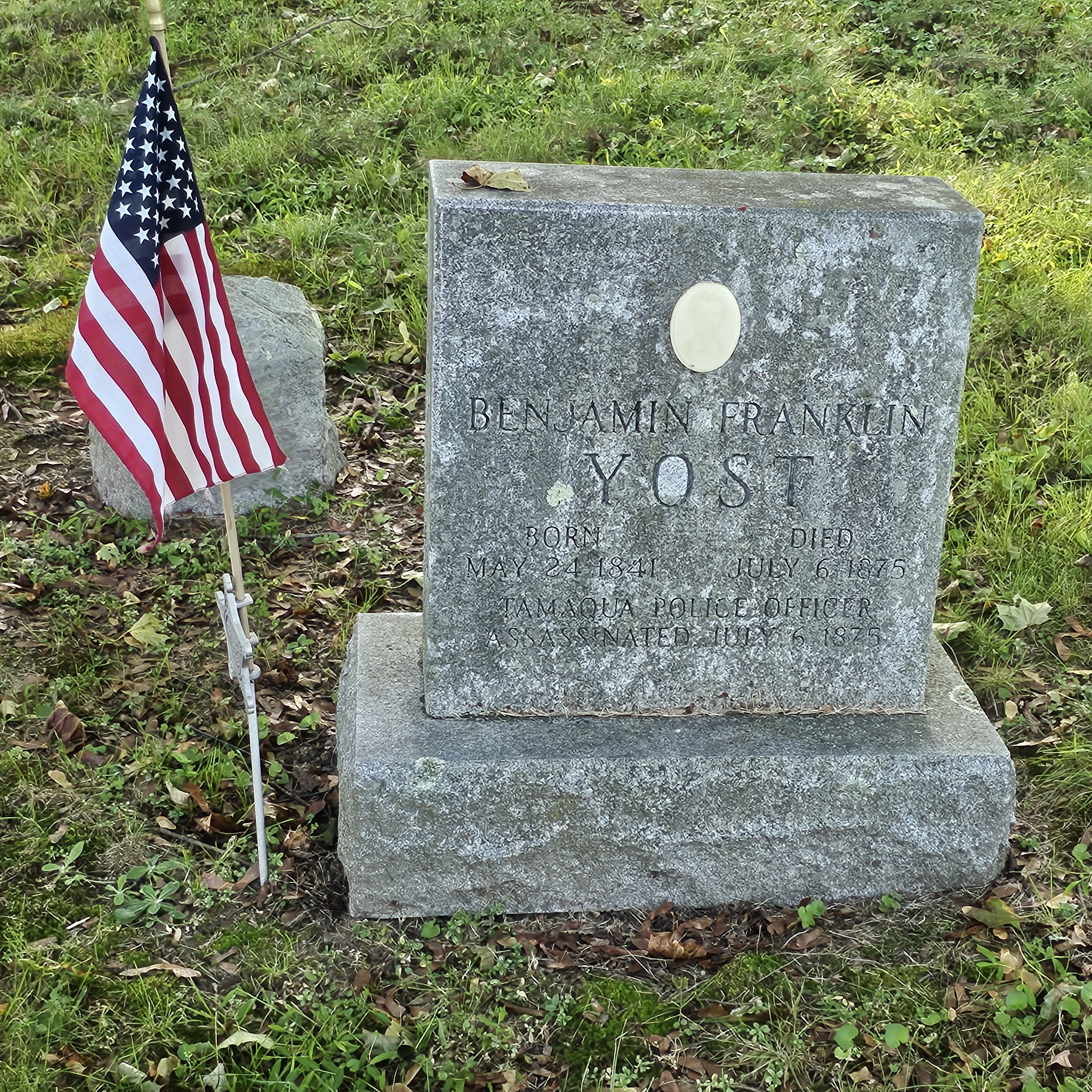
Yost's tombstone in Tamaqua's Odd Fellows Cemetery, which states that he had been "assassinated"

Another plan was in the works, this one against two night watchmen, Pat McCarron and Benjamin Franklin Yost, a Tamaqua Borough Patrolman. Jimmy Kerrigan and Thomas Duffy were said to despise Yost, who had arrested them on numerous occasions. Yost was shot as he put out a street light, which at that time necessitated climbing the lamp pole. Before he died, he reported that his killers were Irish, but were not Kerrigan or Duffy. McParland recorded that a Mollie named William Love had killed a Justice of the Peace, surnamed Gwyther, in Girardville. Unknown Mollies were accused of wounding a man outside his saloon in Shenandoah. Gomer James was killed while tending bar. Then, McParland recorded, a group of Mollies reported to him that they had killed a mine boss named Sanger, and another man who was with him. Forewarned of the attempt, McParland had sought to arrange protection for the mine boss, but was unsuccessful.

==== The trials ====
When Gowen first hired the Pinkerton agency, he had claimed the Molly Maguires were so powerful they had made powerful financial sources and organized labour "their puppets". When the trials of the alleged puppet masters opened, Gowen got himself appointed as special prosecutor.

The first trials were for the killing of John P. Jones. The three defendants, Michael J. Doyle, Jimmy Kerrigan and Edward Kelly, had elected to receive separate trials. Doyle went first, with his trial beginning 18 January 1876, and a conviction for first-degree murder being returned on 1 February. Before the trial was completed, Kerrigan had decided to become a state's witness and gave details about the murders of Jones and Yost. Kelly's trial began on 27 March, and ended in conviction on 6 April 1876.

The first trial of defendants McGeehan, Carroll, Duffy, James Boyle, and James Roarity for the killing of Yost commenced in May 1876. Yost had not recognized the men who attacked him. Although Kerrigan has since been described, along with Duffy, as hating the night watchman enough to plot his murder, Kerrigan became a state's witness and testified against the union leaders and other miners.

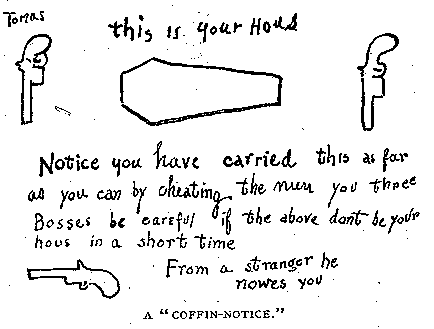
A "coffin notice", allegedly posted by Molly Maguires in Schuylkill County, Pennsylvania. It was presented by Franklin B. Gowen, along with other similar coffin notices, as evidence in an 1876 murder trial.

However, Kerrigan's wife testified in the courtroom that her husband had committed the murder. She testified that she refused to provide her husband with clothing while he was in prison, because he had "picked innocent men to suffer for his crime". She stated that she was speaking out voluntarily, and was only interested in telling the truth about the murder. Gowen cross-examined her, but could not shake her testimony. Others supported her testimony amid speculation that Kerrigan was receiving special treatment due to the fact that McParland was engaged to his sister-in-law, Mary Ann Higgins.

This trial was declared a mistrial due to the death of one of the jurors. A new trial was granted two months later. During that trial, Fanny Kerrigan did not testify. The five defendants were sentenced to death. Kerrigan was allowed to go free. The trial of Tom Munley for the murders of Thomas Sanger, a mine foreman, and William Uren, relied entirely on the testimony of McParland, and the eyewitness account of a witness. The witness stated under oath that he had seen the murderer clearly, and that Munley was not the murderer. Yet the jury accepted McParland's testimony that Munley had privately confessed to the murder. Munley was sentenced to death.

Another four miners were put on trial and were found guilty on a charge of murder. McParland had no direct evidence, but had recorded that the four admitted their guilt to him. Kelly was being held in a cell for murder, and he was reputedly quoted as saying: "I would squeal on Jesus Christ to get out of here." In return for his testimony, the murder charge against him was dismissed.

In November, McAllister was convicted. McParland's testimony in the Molly Maguires trials helped send ten men to the gallows. The defence attorneys repeatedly sought to portray McParland as an agent provocateur who was responsible for not warning people of their imminent deaths. For his part, McParland testified that the AOH and the Mollies were one and the same, and the defendants were guilty of the murders.

In 1905, during the Colorado Labor Wars, in preparation for a trial, McParland told another witness, Harry Orchard, that "Kelly the Bum" not only had won his freedom for testifying against union leaders, he had been given $1,000 (~$35,833 in 2025) to "subsidize a new life abroad". McParland had been attempting to convince Orchard to accuse Bill Haywood, leader of the Western Federation of Miners (WFM), of conspiracy to commit another murder. Unlike the Mollies, the WFM's union leadership was acquitted. Orchard alone was convicted, and spent the rest of his life in prison.

==== The executions ====
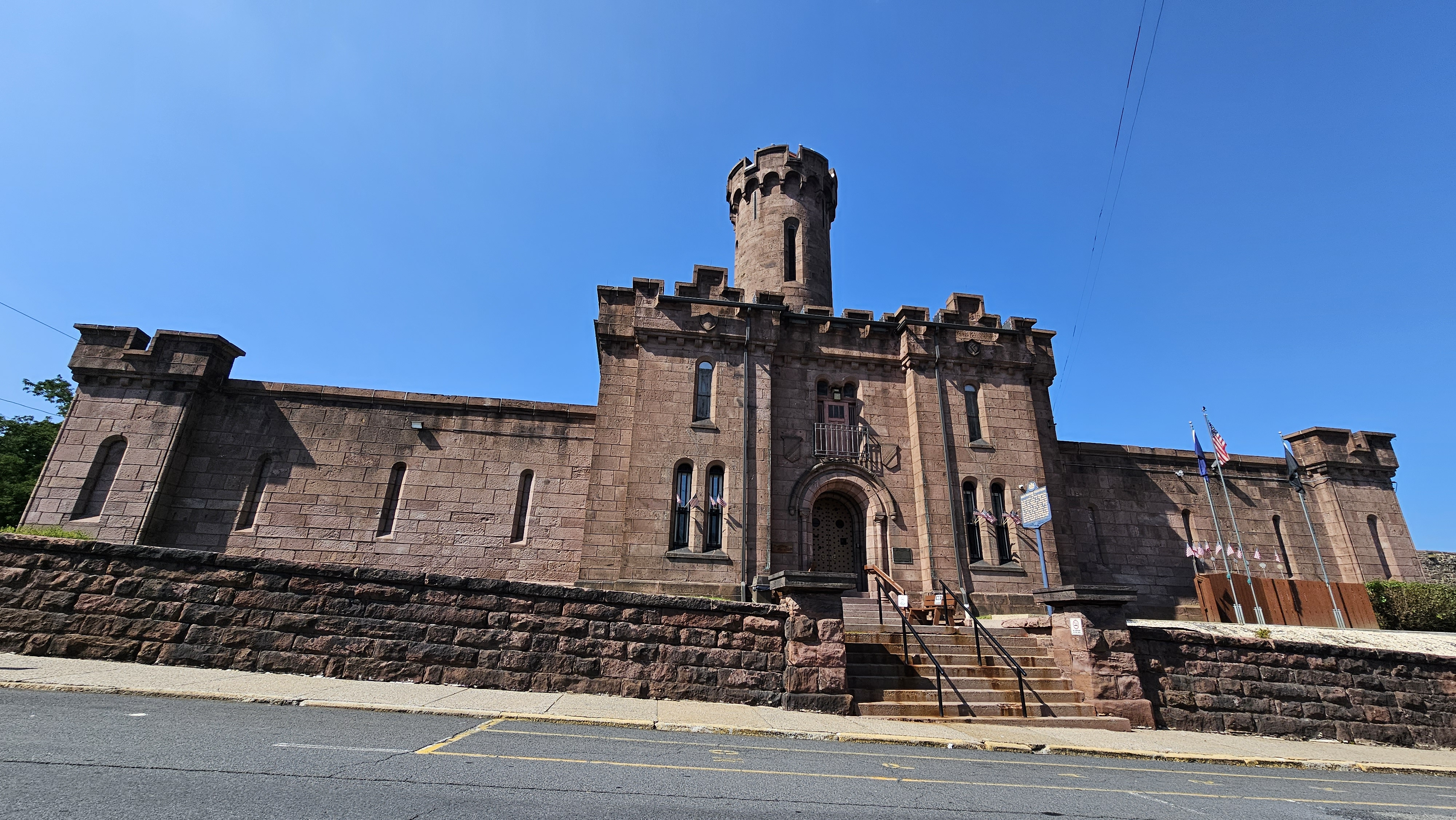
The prison in Pottsville, with a state historical marker for the Molly Maguires execution visible near the entrance

On 21 June 1877, six men were hanged in the prison at Pottsville, and four at Mauch Chunk, Carbon County. A scaffold had been erected in the Carbon County Jail. State militia with fixed bayonets surrounded the prisons and the scaffolds. Miners arrived with their wives and children from the surrounding areas, walking through the night to honour the accused, and by nine o'clock "the crowd in Pottsville stretched as far as one could see." The families were silent, which was "the people's way of paying tribute" to those about to die.

Thomas Munley's aged father had walked more than 10 mi (16 km) from Gilberton to assure his son that he believed in his innocence. Munley's wife arrived a few minutes after they closed the gate, and they refused to open it even for close relatives to say their final goodbyes. She screamed at the gate with grief, throwing herself against it until she collapsed, but she was not allowed to pass. Four men (Alexander Campbell, John "Yellow Jack" Donahue, Michael J. Doyle and Edward J. Kelly) were hanged on 21 June 1877, at a Carbon County prison in Mauch Chunk (renamed Jim Thorpe in 1953), for the murders of John P. Jones and Morgan Powell, both mine bosses, following a trial later described by a Carbon County judge, John P. Lavelle, as follows:

The Molly Maguire trials were a surrender of state sovereignty. A private corporation initiated the investigation through a private detective agency. A private police force arrested the alleged defenders, and private attorneys for the coal companies prosecuted them. The state provided only the courtroom and the gallows.

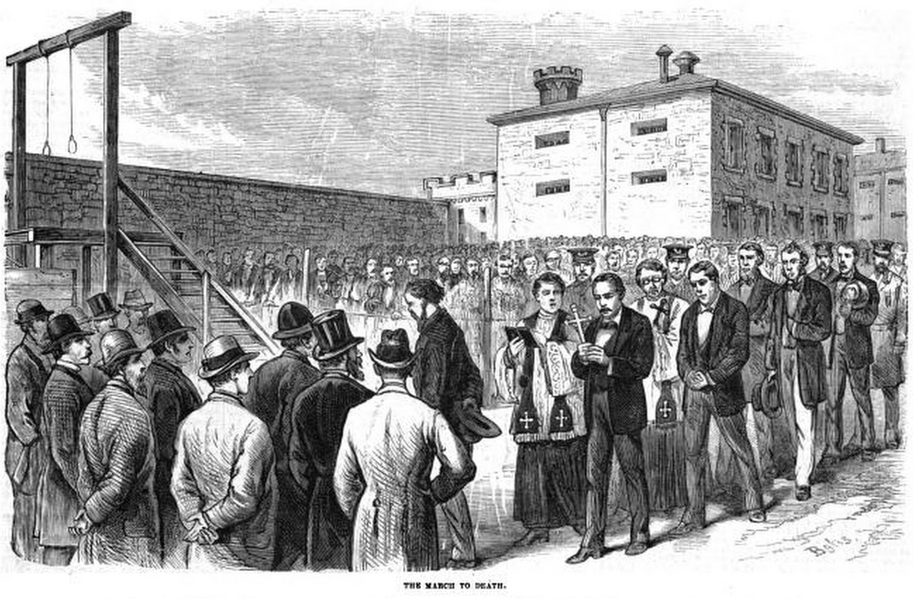
Six of the convicted defendants walking to the scaffold at Pottsville, Pennsylvania, from Leslie's Weekly June 21, 1877

Campbell, just before his execution, allegedly slapped a muddy handprint on his cell wall stating "There is proof of my words. That mark of mine will never be wiped out. It will remain forever to shame the county for hanging an innocent man." Doyle and Hugh McGeehan were led to the scaffold. They were followed by Thomas Munley, James Carroll, James Roarity, James Boyle, Thomas Duffy, Kelly, Campbell, and "Yellow Jack" Donahue. Judge Dreher presided over the trials.

Ten more condemned, Thomas Fisher, John "Black Jack" Kehoe, Patrick Hester, Peter McHugh, Patrick Tully, Peter McManus, Dennis Donnelly, Martin Bergan, James McDonnell and Charles Sharpe, were hanged at Mauch Chunk, Pottsville, Bloomsburg and Sunbury over the next two years. Peter McManus was the last Molly Maguire to be tried and convicted for murder at the Northumberland County Courthouse in 1878.

==== Rhodes's account of the Mollies ====
Many accounts of the Molly Maguires that were written during, or shortly after, the period offer no admission that there was widespread violence in the area, that vigilantism existed, nor that violence was carried out against the miners. In 1910, industrialist and historian James Ford Rhodes published a major scholarly analysis in the leading professional history journal:

==== The aftermath ====
When organized labour helped elect Terence V. Powderly as mayor of Scranton, Pennsylvania two years after the Molly Maguire trials, the opposition vilified his team as the "Molly Maguire Ticket".

In 1979, Pennsylvania Governor Milton Shapp granted a posthumous pardon to John "Black Jack" Kehoe after an investigation by the Pennsylvania Board of Pardons. The request for a pardon was made by one of Kehoe's descendants. John Kehoe had proclaimed his innocence until his death. The Board recommended the pardon after investigating Kehoe's trial and the circumstances surrounding it. Shapp praised Kehoe, saying the men called "Molly Maguires" were "martyrs to labour" and heroes in the struggle to establish a union and fair treatment for workers. And "... [I]t is impossible for us to imagine the plight of the 19th Century miners in Pennsylvania's anthracite region" and that it was Kehoe's popularity among the miners that led Gowen "'to fear, despise and ultimately destroy [him]'".

== In popular culture ==
- La Quittance de Minuit (two volume novel), French, 1846, by Paul Féval. Set in County Galway during the 1830s, it tells a fictional story of the conflict between Molly-Maguires and Anglo-Irish landlords and military.
- The Molly Maguires, a feature film starring Richard Harris as James McParland and Sean Connery as Molly leader Jack Kehoe, was released in 1970.
- Dungeon Crawler Carl Book 6, The Eye of the Bedlam Bride, included the Achievement "The Molly Maguires" which Carl gets after entering the "Guild of Suffering" for the first time.
- The Molly Maguires (sometimes Make Way for the Molly Maguires) is a well known Irish trad song by Phil Coulter and Bill Martin, first performed by The Dubliners in 1969.

== See also ==
- Anti-Rent War
- Battle of Blair Mountain
- Coal and Iron Police
- Coal strike of 1902
- Coal Wars
- Colorado Labor Wars
- Copper Country strike of 1913–1914
- Cripple Creek miners' strike of 1894
- Harlan County War
- Illinois coal wars
- List of worker deaths in United States labor disputes
- John P. Morris
- Mining in the United States
- Secret society
- Scotch Cattle, miners in 19th-century South Wales who would attack colleagues who worked during strikes.
- West Virginia coal wars
