= Albert Horsley =

Canadian-born American miner and assassin (1866–1954)

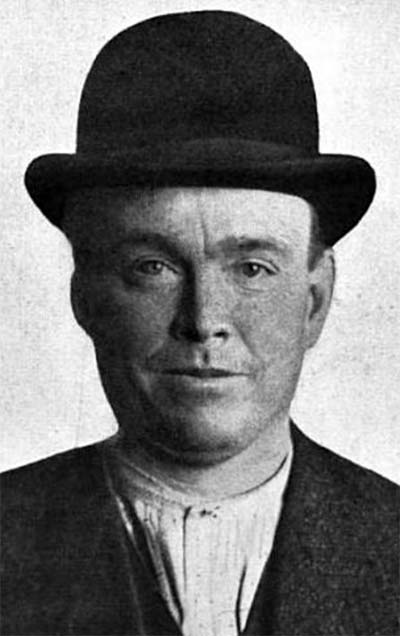
- "Harry Orchard from a photograph taken in January 1906, shortly after his arrest for the murder of ex-Governor Steunenberg."
- Born: March 18, 1866; Wooler, Ontario, Canada
- Died: April 13, 1954 (aged 88); Old Idaho State Penitentiary, Boise, Idaho, U.S.
- Resting place: Morris Hill Cemetery; Boise, Idaho
- Other names: Harry Orchard, Tom Hogan
- Occupations: Logger, Cheesemaker, Milkman, Miner
- Children: 1 daughter
- Status: Deceased
- Conviction: Murder
- Penalty: Death; commuted to life imprisonment

Albert Edward Horsley (March 18, 1866 – April 13, 1954), best known by the pseudonym Harry Orchard, was a miner convicted of the 1905 political assassination of former Idaho Governor Frank Steunenberg. The case was one of the most sensational and widely reported of the first decade of the 20th century, involving three prominent leaders of the radical Western Federation of Miners as co-defendants in an alleged conspiracy to commit murder.

== Biography ==
=== Early years ===
Albert Edward Horsley was born March 18, 1866, in Northumberland County, Ontario, Canada, the son of English and Irish parentage. One of eight children in a poor farm family, Albert was only able to attend formal school through the third grade, helping to support the family by working as soon as he was able. Albert worked as a farmhand for neighbors, either on a daily or monthly basis, with his parents receiving the income from his work until he was 20 years old.

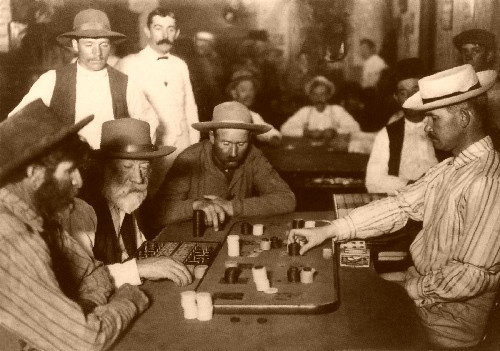
Miners playing faro in a saloon in 1895

At the age of 22, Horsley left home to work as a logger in Saginaw, Michigan. He returned to Canada and married around 1889. The Horsleys spent some time as cheesemakers, both independently and in the employ of others. His wife gave birth to a daughter, removing her from their cheese factory, while Albert later recalled that he "lived away beyond my means, and was some in debt, and my credit was not so good."

Seeking to run away with another woman, Horsley burned his cheese factory and collected the insurance money, thereby settling his debts. Horsley abandoned his family and, together with his girlfriend, headed west to Pilot Bay, about twenty miles from Nelson, British Columbia. The pair spent three months together there before they split up and went their separate ways, with Horsley landing in Spokane, Washington.

In April 1897 Horsley was employed driving a milk wagon to the mining communities around Wallace, Idaho. He worked steadily through 1897, saving his money so that he was able to invest $500 for a 1/16 share of the Hercules silver mine near the town of Burke towards the end of the year. Horsley then quit his milk route and moved to Burke, borrowing money to buy a wood and coal business there. In the spring of 1898 Horsley had to sell his share of the Hercules mine in order to pay the debts he had incurred, also taking a partner into his business to raise funds. His accumulated gambling debts forced him to sell out his share of his business in March 1899, and he had to take a job as a "mucker" (shoveler) in the Tiger-Poorman mine near Burke. It was in this way that Horsley joined the Western Federation of Miners.

Over the next few years Horsley worked as a miner in various locales throughout the American West. He later recalled in his autobiography:

During all this time I did not save any money, though I worked nearly all the time and always got the highest wages... I made many good resolutions and often saved up a few hundred dollars and thought I would get into some little business for myself. When I would get away from town, as I often did, in some out-of-the-way place, I would save my money and make good resolutions; but how soon I would forget them when I would strike town and see a faro game running, or a game of poker. My money would burn my pocket. There were many other attractions, and money always soon got away. I always bought plenty of good clothes and lived well."

Orchard confessed to numerous crimes having nothing to do with labor conflicts. He admitted that he was a bigamist, having abandoned wives in Canada and Cripple Creek. He had burned businesses for the insurance money in Cripple Creek and Canada. Orchard had burglarized a railroad depot, rifled a cash register, stolen sheep, and had planned to kidnap children over a debt. He also sold fraudulent insurance policies.

=== Colorado Labor Wars ===
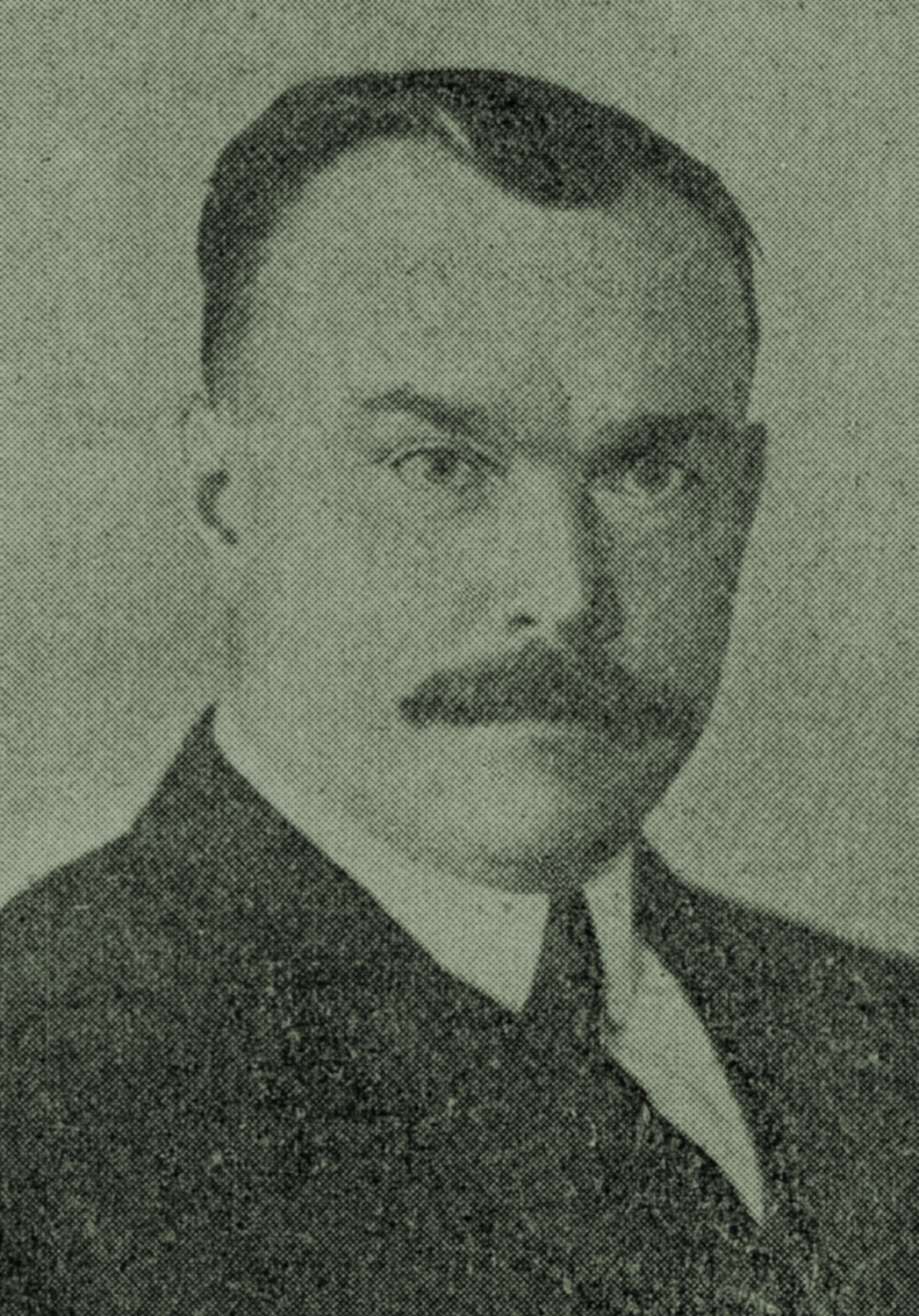
Harry Orchard c. 1907

Orchard confessed to playing a violent, and ultimately, decisive, role in the Colorado Labor Wars. Orchard's confession to McParland claimed responsibility for seventeen or more murders.

Orchard described in his confession that during the Cripple Creek miners' strike he told a railroad detective that the WFM was planning to derail a train along a certain section of track, for which the detective gave him $45 and a train ticket to Denver. According to Orchard, he informed out of jealousy that the WFM had not hired him to do the job; he said that he did not provide any further information. He reportedly told a companion, G.L. Brokaw, that he had been a Pinkerton employee for some time.

=== Steunenberg assassination ===
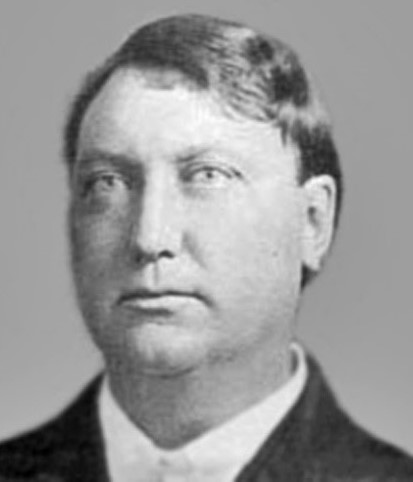
Idaho's ex-Governor Frank Steunenberg, victim of a bomb blast at his home in 1905

On December 30, 1905, Frank Steunenberg, former Governor of Idaho, was killed by a bomb rigged to the gate of his house in Caldwell. After midnight on the evening of Steunenberg's murder, Harry Orchard (as Tom Hogan) walked with Clinton Wood, the desk clerk at the hotel in Caldwell, to the site of the assassination at 1602 Dearborn Street (43.6576°N 116.6823°W), now hours past. Although he didn't seem to know the way to the murder scene, Orchard expressed the belief that the governor had been given a "big wad" of money by Idaho mine owners after he had left office. Such a view was common among miners, as reflected in a 1908 union pamphlet on the 1899 Coeur d'Alene mine strike.

Within an hour of the explosion, the sheriff had deputized 100 townspeople, and stationed them at all roads and paths leading out of town. Orchard made no effort to escape, and slept in his hotel room that night in Caldwell. The next day, Sunday, December 31, he was suspected and placed under parole, and was arrested for the assassination on New Year's Day. He raised suspicion when a detective for the Mine Owners' Association recognized him as Orchard; he responded that his name was Hogan; and, it was discovered that he was registered at the Saratoga Hotel. When his room #19 was searched, evidence related to the murder was discovered. Aside from using aliases, Orchard made little attempt to conceal his activities. Historian Melvyn Dubofsky has theorized that Orchard suffered from a "psychotic personality disorder" that caused him not only to engage in a life of violence, but also, perhaps subconsciously, to set up the circumstances of his own arrest.

Orchard testified that he had made numerous attempts on Steunenberg's life. In the week between Christmas and New Year's, Steunenberg had spent several days in Boise on business and returned to Caldwell on Friday the 29th, and had renewed an insurance policy on Saturday afternoon and stopped off at the Saratoga Hotel to talk with friends before returning home. Minutes before his death, Steunenberg had been sitting in the hotel, so Orchard retrieved the bomb from his room and rushed out to the residence to set it, about a dozen blocks away. On his way back to the hotel, Orchard met the governor two blocks from the house, and the explosion occurred shortly after as Orchard was running to the hotel. The fatal bomb was detonated by rigging the gate so that as it was opened, a bottle of sulfuric acid was spilled onto giant blasting caps. A blasting cap exploded in Orchard's pocket when he was back in his room. He stayed at the hotel until his Monday arrest. Errant first reports had surmised the device was wire-tripped by the assassin and used nitroglycerin.

=== The Haywood trial ===
Facing the death penalty by hanging, Orchard made a confession to Pinkerton detective James McParland in the Frank Steunenberg assassination, confessing as well to the murders of at least sixteen other people. Orchard testified that the murder of Steunenberg was ordered by William Dudley Haywood, Charles Moyer and George Pettibone, all leaders of the Western Federation of Miners. The prosecution alleged that the union leaders had plotted to kill Steunenberg in retaliation for the ex-governor's severe measures against union miners, including a declaration of martial law, following violent incidents during a labor struggle in Coeur d'Alene, Idaho.

Prosecutors selected Haywood as the first of the three defendants to stand trial, thinking him the most vulnerable. His gnarled physical appearance, being blind in one eye, combined with his propensity to use politically radical language, made Haywood more likely to be associated with conspiracy and murder in the minds of the jurors, the prosecution believed. Under Idaho law, jurors were instructed to consider only those parts of Orchard's testimony that were corroborated by other evidence. This was especially difficult because a WFM official who had stayed with Orchard in Idaho had disappeared, and could not be found. The prosecution hoped to corroborate other parts of Orchard's testimony with the confession of Steve Adams, but Adams renounced his confession, claiming that it had been coerced.

The prosecution acted with significant support and direction from Agent McParland, and with assistance from Governor Gooding. Chief prosecuting attorneys were William Borah and James H. Hawley, who were paid in part by money secretly supplied by western mine operators and industrialists. Orchard's testimony was persuasive to reporters attending the trial.

During the trial, McClure's magazine proposed to Governor Gooding that the magazine serialize Orchard's confession and autobiography. McParland wanted maximum publicity for Orchard's confession, but he was reluctant to allow McClure's requirement that they be allowed extensive access to Orchard to go over the document with him, in order to clarify and fill in parts of his story. McParland objected that giving access to McClure's would anger the rest of the press corps, who had been denied access. Governor Gooding interceded with McParland, and McClure's was given exclusive access to Orchard. The first installment of the "Confession and Autobiography of Harry Orchard" came out in the July 1907 McClure's, while the trial was still ongoing, and continued through the November 1907 issue.

The defense argued that Orchard had his own, personal motive for murdering Steunenberg. Defense attorneys Clarence Darrow and Edmund F. Richardson argued that if Orchard hadn't been forced to sell his one-sixteenth share of the mine because of the martial law decree, he would have become wealthy. Orchard had denied the accusation. The Haywood defense team produced five witnesses from three states who testified that Orchard had told them about his anger at Steunenberg. Several of them stated that Orchard had vowed to seek revenge against the former Idaho governor. However, the prosecution presented evidence that Orchard had sold his share of the mine before the labor troubles began. Darrow later observed the date of the sale didn't seem to matter to Orchard; he "tried to sell this interest (again) a year after he had disposed of it."

The defense presented evidence of extensive infiltration, spying, and sabotage of the WFM by the Pinkertons. One witness was Morris Friedman, James McParland's former stenographer. Haywood testified in his own defense, and he stood up well under five hours of cross-examination. Then the defense presented what they claimed was "startling new evidence" about insanity in Orchard's family, including a grandfather who needed to be "chained up" and an uncle who went insane. Orchard admitted that one of his uncles was "demented" over family problems and had hanged himself, but testified to knowing nothing about his maternal grandfather, who died before his birth.

Fremont Wood, the presiding judge in both the Haywood and Pettibone trials, was highly impressed by the way Orchard held up under prolonged and severe cross-examination in each trial, and believed Orchard's testimony to be true. In Wood's experience, no one could have fabricated such a convoluted story, covering many years, in many locations, and including so many different people, and withstand such thorough cross-examination without materially contradicting himself. Wood later wrote that the prosecution case did not convincingly corroborate Orchard's testimony, but that the witnesses put on by the defense actually did a better job corroborating Orchard than the prosecution had done.

=== Results of the trials ===
Even before Darrow's closing argument in the Haywood case, it was clear that the prosecution was in trouble. The prosecution relied on Orchard's testimony to make its case against the WFM leader, but the defense maintained that Orchard had confessed to crimes he could not have committed.

The state of Idaho had provided Orchard with "a library of religious tracts", which may have influenced his announced conversion to religious belief. Some analysts at the trial later opined "the prosecution let Orchard get away from the facts and his testimony turned into a syrupy story of repentance, religion, and God's mercy to sinners, which had the effect of turning everyone's stomach."

Idaho law required that the testimony of a confessed murderer must be independently corroborated by other evidence in order to convict others of murder. The Idaho jury found Haywood not guilty. One juror told a reporter, "There was nothing against the accused but inference and suspicion." Pettibone was found not guilty in a separate trial, after the defense declined to argue the case. Charges against Moyer were dropped.

Steve Adams was tried in three separate trials, resulting in two hung juries in Idaho, and an acquittal in Colorado.

After the rest were acquitted and/or released, Orchard was tried alone. He changed his plea to guilty in March 1908 and received a death sentence in Idaho for the murder of Steunenberg. An appeal was made by the prosecution to Idaho Governor Gooding, urging the commutation of Orchard's death sentence for his previous cooperation in the trials of the union leaders. This request was granted and Orchard's sentence was commuted to life in prison, a decision that was widely lampooned in the press.

== Last years ==
Soon after receiving his sentence, Orchard converted to Seventh-day Adventism. His multiple pleas for a pardon over the years were all denied. He never recanted his confession, and in 1952, at 86 years of age and 45 years after the Haywood trial, Orchard wrote in his autobiography that all of his confession and his trial testimony were true.

=== Death ===
Orchard died in the state penitentiary in Boise on April 13, 1954, aged 88, over 48 years after his arrest. After his sentencing in March 1908, he served more than 46 years at the Old Idaho State Penitentiary, its longest-ever term, and is buried in Morris Hill Cemetery in Boise. As a trusty, he had lived outside the prison walls in a small house for most of his later years, tending the prison's poultry flocks, but was brought back after he had suffered a mild stroke a year earlier. Orchard was bedridden for his last three months and in a coma for his last days.

== See also ==
- Frank Steunenberg, assassinated former governor of Idaho
- James McParland, Pinkerton Detective responsible for investigation
- Steve Adams, accused accomplice
- Bill Haywood, union leader accused of conspiracy
- Frank R. Gooding, governor of Idaho during murder and trials
- Coeur d'Alene miners' dispute, alleged reason for the murder
- List of assassinated American politicians

== Sources ==
- Albert E. Horsley, The Confessions and Autobiography of Harry Orchard book scan, New York: The McClure Company, 1907.
- Albert E. Horsley, The Confessions and Autobiography of Harry Orchard in web format.
