= 1896 Idaho gubernatorial election =

- November 3, 1896
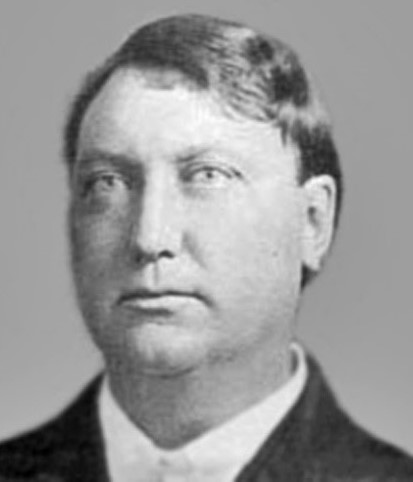

Nominee	Frank Steunenberg	David H. Budlong
Party	Democratic	Republican
Popular vote	22,096	6,441
Percentage	76.79%	22.38%
- Results by county Steunenberg: 60–70% 70–80% 80–90% >90%
Governor before election
William J. McConnell
Republican
Elected Governor
Frank Steunenberg
Democratic

The 1896 Idaho gubernatorial election was held on November 3, 1896. Democratic nominee Frank Steunenberg defeated Republican nominee David H. Budlong with 76.79% of the vote.

== General election ==
=== Candidates ===
Major party candidates

- Frank Steunenberg, Democratic
- David H. Budlong, Republican

Other candidates

- Moses F. Fowler, Prohibition

=== Results ===
1896 Idaho gubernatorial election
Party	Candidate	Votes	%	±%
Democratic	Frank Steunenberg	22,096	76.79%	+48.09%
Republican	David H. Budlong	6,441	22.38%	−19.13%
Prohibition	Moses F. Fowler	239	0.83%	0.00%
Majority		15,655		
Turnout				
Democratic gain from Republican		Swing		
