= 1898 Idaho gubernatorial election =

- November 8, 1898
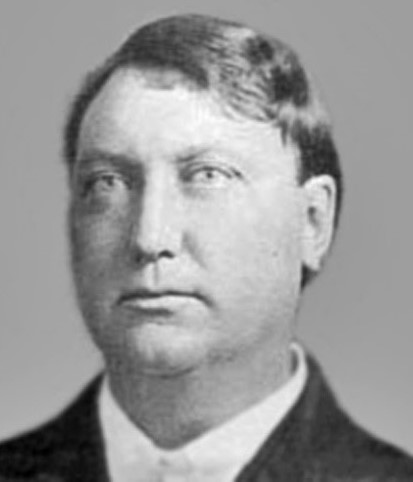

Nominee	Frank Steunenberg	Albert B. Moss	James H. Anderson
Party	Democratic	Republican	Populist
Popular vote	19,407	13,794	5,371
Percentage	48.83%	34.71%	13.51%
- Results by county Steunenberg: 40–50% 50–60% 60–70% 70–80% Moss: 40–50% 50–60% Anderson: 40–50%
Governor before election
Frank Steunenberg
Democratic
Elected Governor
Frank Steunenberg
Democratic

The 1898 Idaho gubernatorial election was held on November 8, 1898. Incumbent Democrat Frank Steunenberg defeated Republican nominee Albert B. Moss with 48.83% of the vote.

== General election ==
=== Candidates ===
Major party candidates

- Frank Steunenberg, Democratic
- Albert B. Moss, Republican

Other candidates

- James H. Anderson, People's
- Mary C. Johnson, Prohibition

=== Results ===
1898 Idaho gubernatorial election
Party	Candidate	Votes	%	±%
Democratic	Frank Steunenberg (incumbent)	19,407	48.83%	−27.96%
Republican	Albert B. Moss	13,794	34.71%	+12.33%
Populist	James H. Anderson	5,371	13.51%	N/A
Prohibition	Mary C. Johnson	1,175	2.96%	+2.13%
Majority		5,613		
Turnout				
Democratic hold		Swing		
