= 1899 Coeur d'Alene labor confrontation =

Labor riot in Idaho, United States

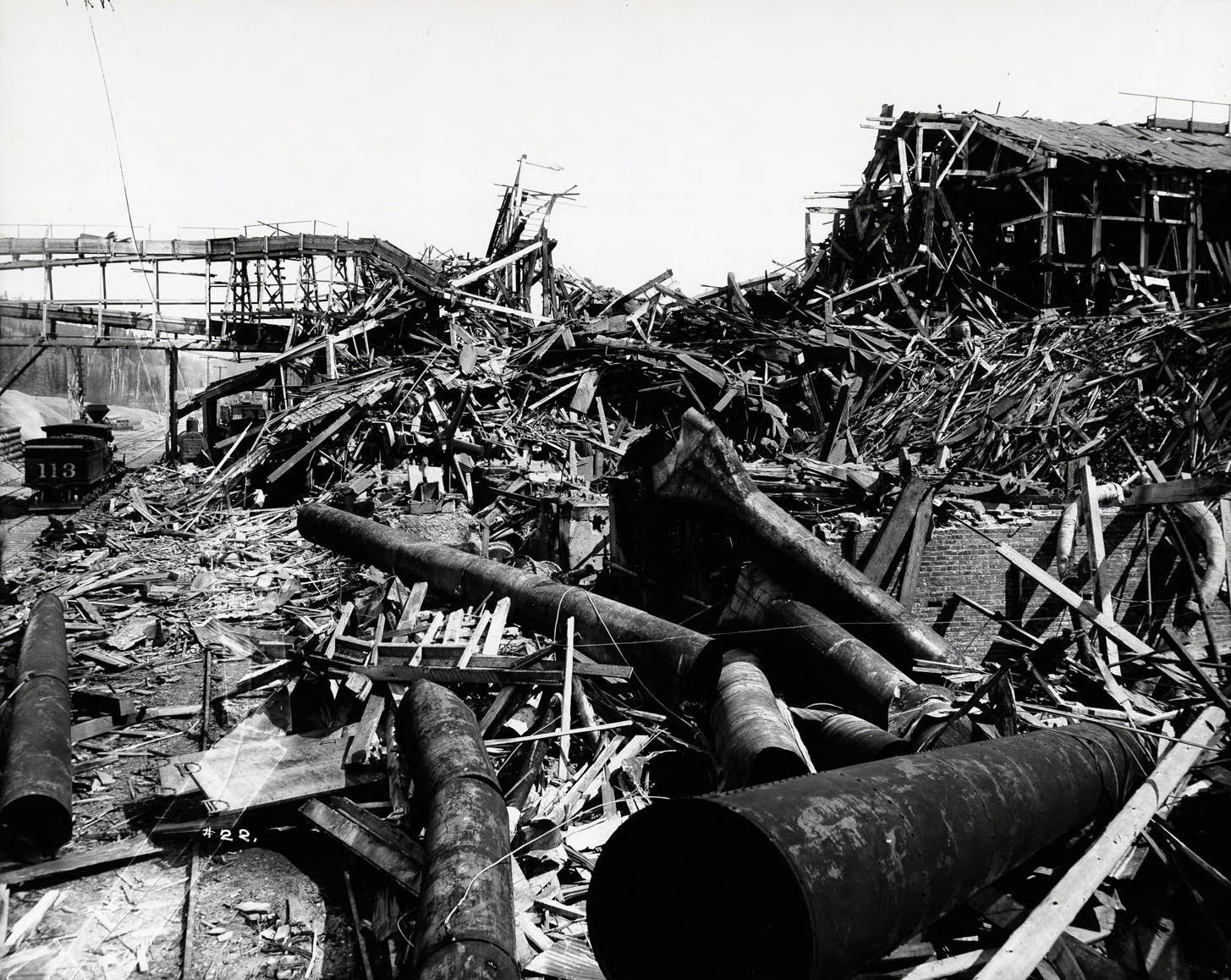
Bunker Hill and Sullivan Mill sometime after the 1899 Coeur d'Alene explosion

The Coeur d'Alene, Idaho, labor riot of 1899 was the second of two major labor-management confrontations in the Coeur d'Alene mining district of northern Idaho in the 1890s. Like the first incident seven years earlier, the 1899 confrontation was an attempt by union miners, led by the Western Federation of Miners to unionize non-union mines, and have them pay the higher union wage scale. As with the 1892 strike, the 1899 incident culminated in a dynamite attack that destroyed a non-union mining facility, the burning of multiple homes and outbuildings and two murders, followed by military occupation of the district.

The riot of 1899 resulted from the miners' frustrations with mine operators that paid lower wages, hired Pinkerton or Thiel operatives to infiltrate the union, and the refusal of non-union miners to join or strike.

== Background ==
=== Miners strike of 1892 ===
Angered by wage cuts, Coeur d'Alene area miners conducted a strike in 1892. The strike erupted in violence when union miners discovered they had been infiltrated by a Pinkerton agent who had routinely provided union information to the mine owners. After several deaths, the U.S. army occupied the area and forced an end to the strike. The response to that violence, disastrous for the local miners' union, became the primary motivation for the formation of the Western Federation of Miners (WFM) the following year.

=== The second military occupation, 1894 ===
Pro-union sentiment remained strong in the area, and by 1894, most of the mines were unionized, represented by the Knights of Labor.

Violence erupted in the Coeur d'Alene district during the national Pullman railroad strike of 1894. Union members attacked non-union mines and workers. Forty masked men shot to death John Kneebone, who had testified against union miners in 1892. Others kidnapped a mine superintendent, and tried to blow up the powder house at the Bunker Hill mine.

Urged by the mine owners, the Idaho governor requested federal troops, supposedly to prevent interruptions in railroad service along the Northern Pacific route through the Coeur d'Alene area. President Grover Cleveland sent about 700 troops in July 1894. Major General John Schofield, determined to avoid embroiling his troops in a local labor dispute as they were in 1892, directed that the Army confine its mission to keeping the railroads running, and not take orders from state or local officials. The Army patrolled the railroad lines, and reported no disturbances or local opposition. The union members, wanting to avoid another military occupation, stopped the attacks on non-union targets.

The Army repeatedly reported that there were no disturbances of rail transport, and requested permission to withdraw the troops. The mine owners pressured the Cleveland administration to keep the troops in place. The mine owners eventually realized that the Army would not expand its mission beyond protecting the railroad, and dropped their opposition to withdrawal of the troops. The Army units left the Coeur d'Alene in September 1894.^{p. 163-165}

In December 1894, the Bunker Hill and Sullivan mine shut down rather than agree to the union demand of a uniform wage of $3.50 (~$130.00 in 2025) per day. The mine reopened in June 1895, with nonunion labor paying $3.00 per day to miners and $2.50 to surface employees and unskilled underground labor. The company said that whenever the combined prices of lead and silver rose again to a certain point, they would restore the old wage rate.

=== Leading up to the 1899 clash ===
The Bunker Hill Mining Company at Wardner was profitable, having paid more than $600,000 in dividends. Miners working in the Bunker Hill and Sullivan mines were receiving fifty cents to a dollar less per day than other miners, which at that time represented a significant percentage of the paycheck. The properties were the only mines in the district that were not entirely unionized.

In April 1899, as the union was launching an organizing drive of the few locations not yet unionized, superintendent Albert Burch declared that the company would rather "shut down and remain closed twenty years" than to recognize the union. He then fired seventeen workers that he believed to be union members and demanded that all other union men collect their back pay and quit.

== Dynamite Express ==
The strike by the union local at Wardner was not succeeding, and the nearby WFM locals, at Gem, Burke, and Mullan, feared that the other mine owners would cut wages to match those paid at the Bunker Hill mine. During the trial, these proved to be only rumors. The other WFM locals agreed to support the strike at Wardner. The officers of the WFM locals met and planned a massive show of force for April 29.

On April 29, 250 union members seized a train in Burke, northeast of Wallace; the engineer, Levi "Al" Hutton, later claimed at gunpoint. At each stop through Burke Canyon, more miners climbed aboard. In Mace, a hundred men climbed aboard. At Frisco, the train stopped to load eighty wooden boxes, each containing fifty pounds (23 kg) of dynamite. At Gem, 150 to 200 more miners climbed onto three freight cars which had been added to the train. In Wallace, 200 miners were waiting, having walked seven miles (11 km) from Mullan. About a thousand men rode the train to Wardner, the site of a $250,000 mill of the Bunker Hill mine. Witnesses later testified that the majority of those on the train knew nothing of any planned violence when they started out; they thought that it would be just a massive demonstration to intimidate the mine owners into recognizing the union. However, the union had distributed masks and firearms to between 100 and 200 of the men, who acted as if under military discipline. The pro-union Idaho State Tribune in Wallace wrote:

"At no time did the demonstration assume the appearance of a disorganized mob. All the details were managed with the discipline and precision of a perfectly trained military organization."

County sheriff James D. Young, who had been elected with union support, had ridden to Wardner on the train with the union miners. At Wardner, Young climbed atop a rail car, and ordered the group to disperse. His order was ignored, and he later said that any further attempt to restrain the miners would have been suicidal. State prosecutors claimed that Young had been paid off by the WFM.

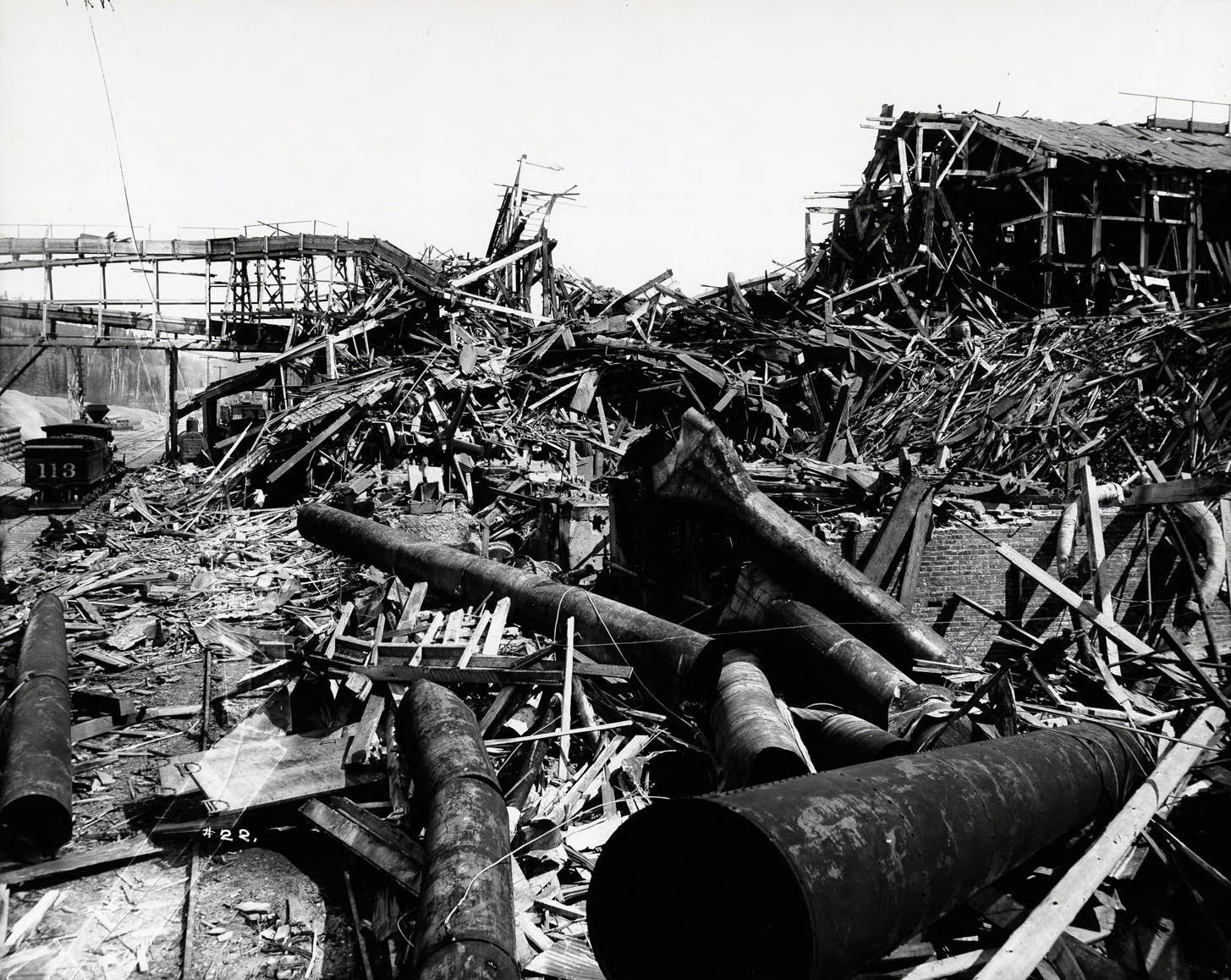
Bunker Hill and Sullivan Mill after the 1899 Coeur d'Alene explosion.

Word had reached Wardner by telephone that the union miners were on their way, and most of the mine and mill workers had fled. The crowd ordered the remaining workers out of the Bunker Hill mine and mill. Once out, they were ordered to run, and some shots fired at them as they ran. James Cheyne was shot in the hip, then union miners shot more bullets into him as he lay on the ground; he died shortly after. One union man, John Smith, also called Schmidt, was mistakenly shot to death by other union men.

After carrying three thousand pounds (1,400 kg) of dynamite into the mill, the blast completely destroyed the mill. The crowd also burned down the company office, the boarding house, and the home of the mine manager. The miners re-boarded the "Dynamite Express" and returned the way they came. Working men gathered along the track, and according to the pro-union Idaho State Tribune, "cheered the [union] men lustily as they passed."."

== Arrests ==
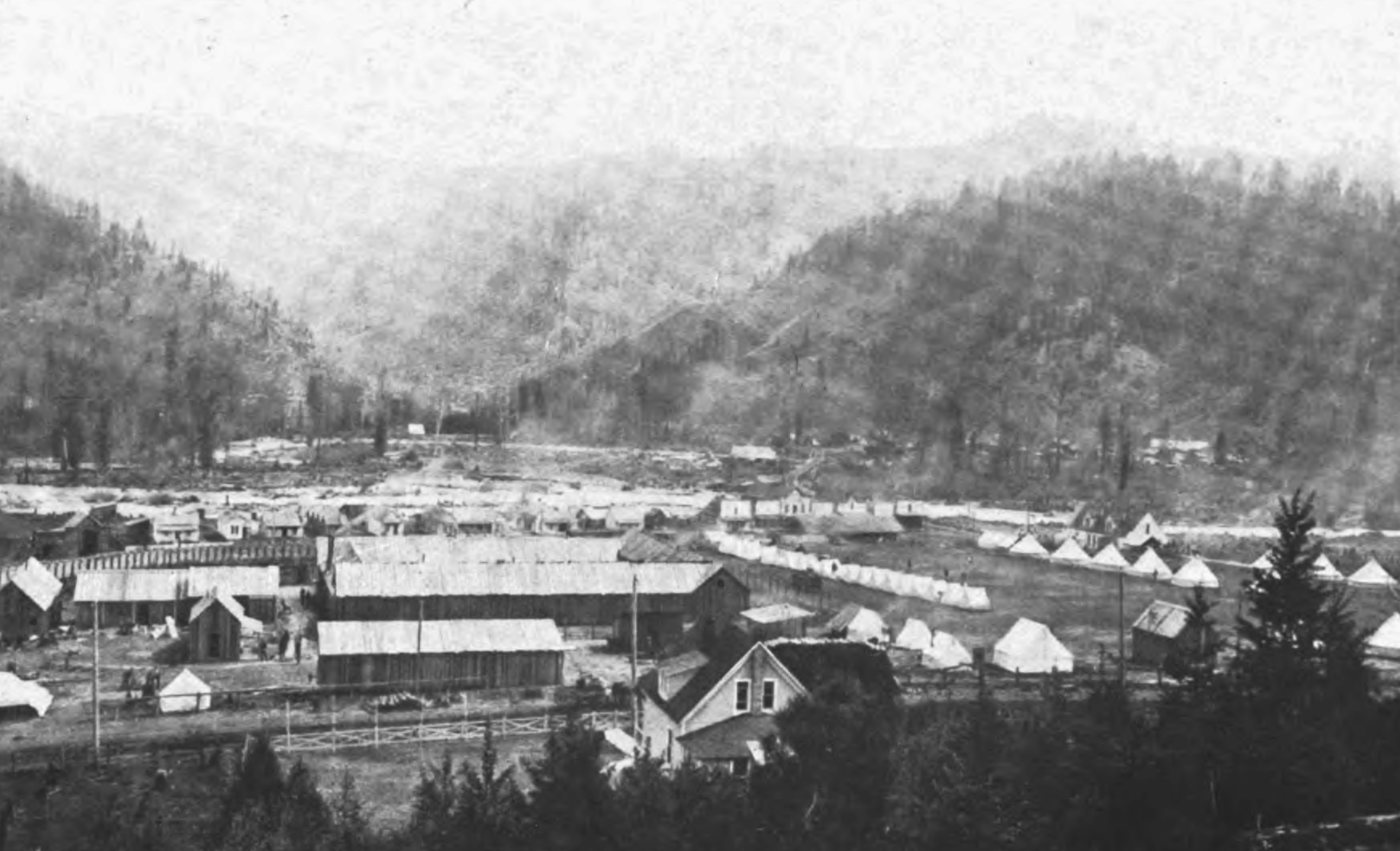
The temporary wooden prison built in Wardner, Idaho, popularly called "the bullpen".

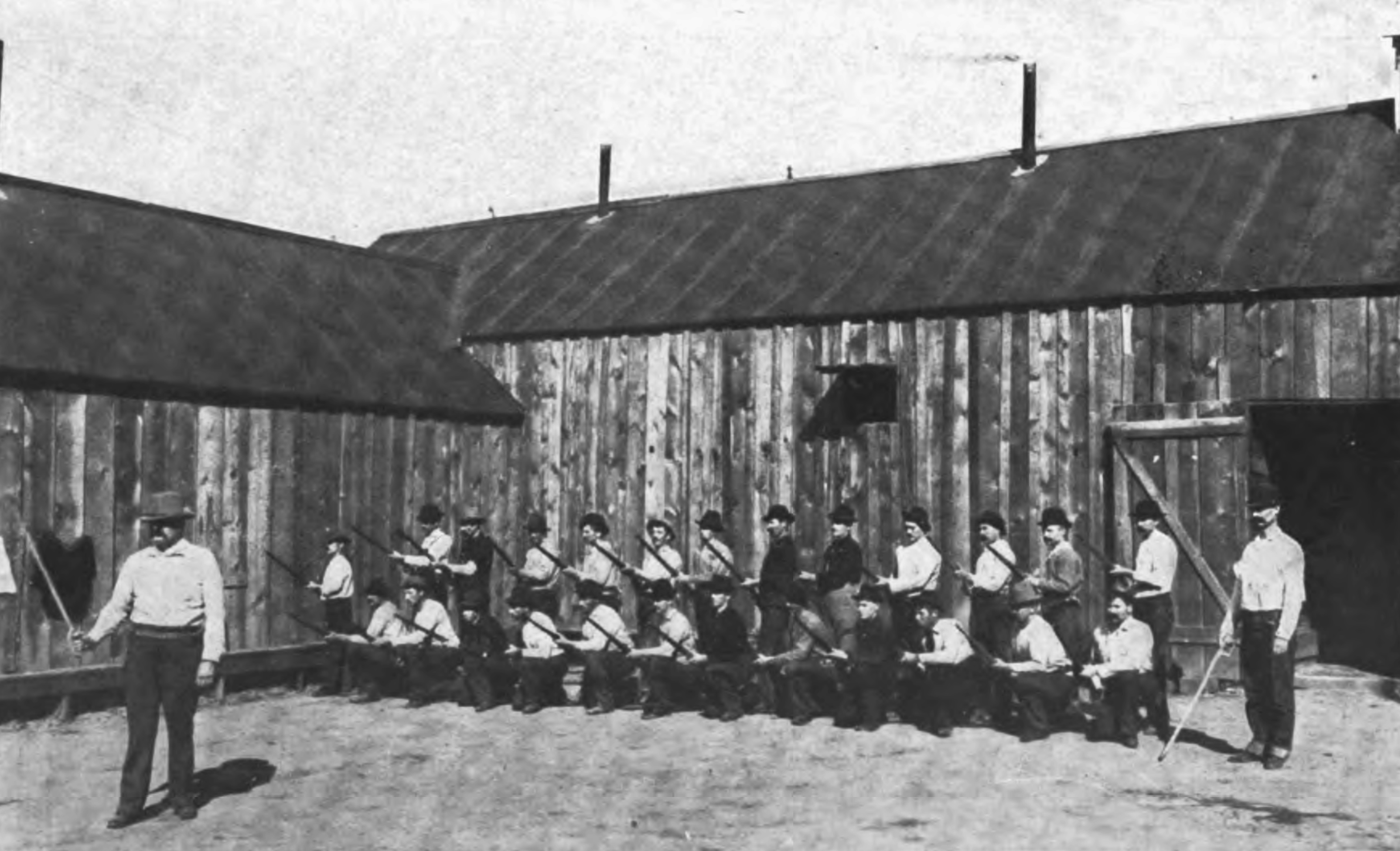
Prisoners drill with wooden rifles in the "bullpen", Wardner, Idaho, 1899.

At the Idaho governor's request, President William McKinley sent in the Army. The majority of army troops sent to the Coeur d'Alene were African American soldiers of the 24th Infantry Regiment, stationed in Spokane, Salt Lake City, and other western posts. The 24th had distinguished itself in combat during the Spanish–American War, and was seen as one of the most disciplined Army units not then serving overseas. Bill Haywood criticized the U.S. government's attempts to turn whites against blacks. Haywood wrote: "it was a deliberate attempt to add race prejudice ... race prejudice had been unknown among the miners." Nevertheless, he wrote that the government's efforts weren't all that successful, as the miners' turn against the army outweighed any racial dispute.

State authorities used the troops to round up 1,000 men and put them into "the bullpen". The arrests were indiscriminate; Governor Steunenberg's representative, state auditor Bartlett Sinclair believed that all the people of Canyon Creek had a "criminal history", and "the entire community, or the male portion of it, ought to be arrested". The soldiers searched every house, breaking down the door if no one answered.

Mass arrests began on May 4, when 128 were arrested. More than two hundred were arrested the following day, and the arrests continued until about a thousand men had been arrested.^{p. 31}

As Sinclair had ordered, they arrested every male: miners, bartenders, a doctor, a preacher, even the postmaster and school superintendent. ... Cooks and waiters [were] arrested in kitchens, diners at their supper tables. ... For desperate criminals, the men of Burke went quietly, the only gunshot was aimed at a "vicious watch dog".

What was called "the bullpen" was actually a number of structures. The first 150 prisoners were kept in an old barn, a two-story frame structure 120 by 40 feet (37 by 12 m) and filled with hay. It was "still very cold in those altitudes" and the men, having been arrested with no opportunity to bring along blankets, "suffered some from the weather". As the barn became overcrowded, new prisoners were put in railroad boxcars. When both these became overcrowded, the prisoners were then forced to build a pine board prison for themselves, and it was surrounded by a six-foot barbed wire fence patrolled by armed soldiers. Conditions remained primitive, and three prisoners died.^{p. 171}

The U.S. Army followed escaping miners into Montana and arrested them, returning them to Idaho, and failed to comply with jurisdictional or extradition laws. One man arrested and transported was a Montana citizen who had no connection to the Wardner events.

Two of the three county commissioners had been caught in the roundup, as had the local sheriff. These, too, were held prisoner. Later, a district court removed all of the county commissioners and the sheriff from office, charging that they'd neglected their official duties.

Most of those arrested were freed within two weeks. By May 12, 450 prisoners remained; by May 30, the number was 194. Releases slowed, and 65 remained incarcerated on October 10;^{p. 148-149}^{p. 37,40,73} the last prisoners in the bullpen were released in early December 1899.

== Aftermath ==
Arrangements with replacement officials installed by Sinclair demonstrated "a pattern".

The new regime's principal [sic] patronage—the fat contract for supplying food and drink to the bullpen's prisoners—had gone to Tony Tubbs, the former manager of Bunker Hill's boardinghouse, destroyed on April 29. Likewise, most of the thirty men Sinclair hired as special "state deputies" were either employees and former employees of the Bunker Hill Company or contractors for it. Among the most prominent was a saloonkeeper named W.C. "Convict" Murphy, who'd served time for horse stealing and cattle rustling. When Convict Murphy broke down people's doors, he was sometimes asked for a search warrant or other authority, at which he would draw a pair of six-shooters and say, "These are my warrants."

Emma F. Langdon, a union sympathizer, charged in a 1908 book that Idaho Governor Frank Steunenberg, who had been "considered a poor man", deposited $35,000 into his bank account within a week after troops arrived in the Coeur d'Alene district, implying that there may have been a bribe from the mine operators. Subsequent research appears to have uncovered the apparent source of this assertion. J. Anthony Lukas recorded in his book Big Trouble,

In 1899, when the state needed money for the Coeur d'Alene prosecutions, the Mine Owners' Association had come up with $32,000—about a third of it from Bunker Hill and Sullivan—handing $25,000 over to Governor Steunenberg for use at his discretion in the prosecution. Some of this money went to pay [attorneys].

Steunenberg was later assassinated by Harry Orchard who claimed to have been hired by the WFM.

In his autobiography, WFM Secretary-Treasurer Bill Haywood described Idaho miners held for "months of imprisonment in the 'bull-pen'—a structure unfit to house cattle—enclosed in a high barbed-wire fence." Haywood concluded that the companies and their supporters in government—intent upon forcing wage cuts and employers' freedom to fire union miners—were conducting class warfare against the working class. Peter Carlson wrote in his book Roughneck,

Haywood traveled to the town of Mullan, where he met a man who had escaped from the 'bullpen'. The makeshift prison was an old grain warehouse that reeked of excrement and crawled with vermin.

Thirty-four-year-old Paul Corcoran was the financial secretary of the Burke Miners Union and a member of the Central Mining Union. The State pursued charges against him. While he had not been at the scene of the riot, Corcoran had been seen on the roof of a boxcar on the Dynamite Express, and at multiple union halls along the route, rallying men on to Wardner. He additionally told the Burke mine manager Mr. Culbertson that his employees had left for the day and were on their way to Wardner, but would return in time for the night shift. The prosecution, whose salaries were paid by a $32,000 grant from the mine owners, argued that Corcoran should take part of the blame for planning the attack on the Bunker Hill mill and Sullivan mine. Corcoran was sentenced to seventeen years at hard labor. Eight more miners and union leaders accused of leading the attack were scheduled for trial on charges of murder and/or arson, but bribed an army sergeant to allow them to escape. Hundreds more remained in the makeshift prison without charges.

Meanwhile, Sinclair developed a permit system which would prevent mines from hiring any miner who belonged to a union. The plan was designed to destroy the unions in the Coeur d'Alene district after the violence and lawlessness of the last 7 years. General Henry C. Merriam of the U.S. Army endorsed the permit system verbally and in writing, resulting in considerable consternation at the McKinley White House.

The editor of one local newspaper, Wilbur H. Stewart of the Mullan Mirror, dared to criticize the bullpen and its keepers. Sinclair appeared at his door alongside a major and several soldiers with unsheathed bayonets. Sinclair declared,

I find that you have been publishing a seditious newspaper, inciting riot and insurrection, and we have concluded that publication of your paper must cease.

Stewart was taken to the bullpen, where he was assigned to garbage and latrine duty. However, the paper did not stop publication; Stewart's young wife, Maggie, continued to publish the weekly. Sinclair impounded her type, and she contracted with another sympathetic publisher to continue the news. Eventually Stewart was released under instructions to end the criticism. He sold the newspaper instead.

Many populist elected officials in Shoshone County were rounded up for their support of the miners. The town sheriff of Mullan, Idaho was arrested and sent to the bullpen.

May Arkwright Hutton, whose husband was the engineer on the dynamite express, wrote a book, The coeur d' alenes: or, A Tale of the Modern Inquisition in Idaho, about the treatment of the miners, and her husband, at the hands of the mine owners and the sheriff.

Both Huttons and Ed Boyce, head of the Western Federation of Miners, had invested in the Hercules silver mine before the 1899 war. After they had become wealthy mine owners, May Hutton sought to buy back all copies of her book. Ed Boyce quit the miners union to manage a hotel in Portland.

== See also ==
- Coeur d'Alene miners' dispute (overview of both Coeur d'Alene incidents)
- Ed Boyce, WFM leader
- Frank Steunenberg, Governor of Idaho in 1899, assassinated in 1905
- Harry Orchard, later convicted of assassinating former Idaho Governor Steunenberg
- Steve Adams, accused accomplice of Harry Orchard, unconvicted or acquitted in three trials
- Bill Haywood, WFM union leader, later accused and acquitted of conspiracy to assassinate former Idaho Governor Steunenberg
- George Pettibone, WFM union supporter, later accused and acquitted of conspiracy to murder former Idaho Governor Steunenberg
- Colorado Labor Wars of 1903–04
- Murder of workers in labor disputes in the United States
