= Frank Steunenberg =

American politician; 4th governor of Idaho (1897–1901)

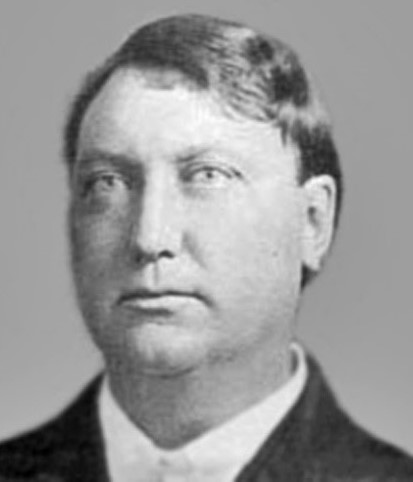

4th Governor of Idaho
- In office January 4, 1897 – January 7, 1901
- Lieutenant: George F. Moore; J. H. Hutchinson
- Preceded by: William J. McConnell
- Succeeded by: Frank W. Hunt

Delegate to the Idaho Constitutional Convention
- In office July 4, 1889 – August 6, 1889
- Constituency: Ada County

Personal details
- Born: August 8, 1861 Keokuk, Iowa, U.S.
- Died: December 30, 1905 (aged 44) Caldwell, Idaho, U.S.
- Cause of death: Assassination
- Party: Democratic
- Other political affiliations: Populist
- Spouse: Belle Keppel
- Children: 5
- Education: Iowa State University

Frank Steunenberg (August 8, 1861 – December 30, 1905) was the fourth governor of the State of Idaho, serving from 1897 until 1901. He was assassinated in 1905 by onetime union member Harry Orchard.

== Early career ==
Born in Keokuk, Iowa, and raised in Knoxville, Steunenberg was the fourth of 10 children of Bernardus and Cornelia (Keppel) Steunenberg, with five brothers and four sisters. He attended Iowa State College at Ames and then went on to become a printer's apprentice and publisher. In 1881, he was hired by the Des Moines Register in Des Moines. Steunenberg later published a newspaper in Knoxville until 1886, when he moved west and settled in Caldwell, Idaho Territory, where he joined his younger brother Albert K. Steunenberg (1863–1907) in taking over the Caldwell Tribune for six years.

Steunenberg became active in politics as a member of the 1889 Idaho Constitutional Convention which led to Idaho's admission to the Union in 1890. In 1890, he was elected to the Idaho House of Representatives as a fusion candidate, endorsed by both the Democratic and Populist Parties, and he served one term. In addition, he served for several years as chairman of the Caldwell town council.

== Governor ==
With labor union support, in 1896 Steunenberg was nominated as both the Democratic and Populist candidate for governor. He won the November election at age 35 (the youngest in the state's history) and became the first non-Republican elected to that office and was re-elected to a second two-year term in 1898. (Note: Four-year terms for the Governor of Idaho began with the 1946 election.) Steunenberg served during a period of considerable labor unrest, particularly in the mining industry in northern Idaho. As a result, many corporations, fearing that Steunenberg's government would not support them if there was a strike, increased their wages for workers.

The Bunker Hill Mining Company, however, hired only non-union labor and kept wages lower than unionized mines in the area. In April 1899, members of the Western Federation of Miners destroyed the company's mill at Wardner in the Silver Valley. In response, Steunenberg declared martial law and because the national guard was deployed to the Philippines due to the Spanish–American War of the preceding year, Steunenberg asked President William McKinley to send federal troops to quell the unrest. This action was seen as a betrayal by Steunenberg's union supporters. Martial law remained in place through the end of his term, and Steunenberg did not seek a third term in 1900.

== Assassination ==
Nearly five years after he left office, Steunenberg was killed outside his house in Caldwell at 1602 Dearborn Street (43.6576°N 116.6823°W) by a bomb rigged to the side gate on 16th Avenue. Harry Orchard, a former miner from the Western Federation of Miners (WFM), was arrested in Caldwell shortly after for the assassination, and the investigation was conducted by Pinkerton agent James McParland. Orchard at first claimed innocence, but after solitary confinement and intense interrogation by McParland, Orchard signed a 64-page typewritten confession detailing years of being a paid assassin and dynamiter for the WFM. Orchard claimed he was hired to kill Steunenberg by leadership of the WFM, and he had been in previous jobs that resulted in at least 17 other deaths. Orchard said his orders for the killing of Steunenberg came from "Big Bill" Haywood, general secretary of the WFM, Charles Moyer, president of the WFM, and George Pettibone, a labor activist who had a prior conviction related to an 1892 labor dispute in Coeur d'Alene. At McParland's urging, the three were arrested in Denver in February 1908, and hurriedly extradited to Idaho for trial.

The nationally publicized trial took place in Boise over several months in mid-1907 and included new U.S. Senator William Borah for the prosecution and Clarence Darrow for the defense. On the witness stand, Orchard repeated his written confession, admitting to years of setting bombs for the WFM. He was then cross-examined by defense lawyers for 26 hours, spread out over a week's time. In addition to Orchard, the prosecution presented 80 more witnesses to corroborate Orchard's description of numerous attacks. Darrow and the defense team called over 100 witnesses of their own. Closing arguments lasted two weeks, the most talked about of which was by Darrow. Modern commentators have praised Darrow's closing argument, which used powerful emotional rhetoric focused on the moral superiority of the unions' position. However, contemporary reaction was universally negative. The Chicago Tribune called it "the most unseemly, abusive, inflammatory speech ever delivered in an American courtroom." Despite most observers' opinions that the verdict would be guilty, the jury returned an acquittal for Haywood in late July. Pettibone was defended in a separate trial by Judge Orrin N. Hilton of Denver and was also acquitted, and charges were dropped against Moyer.

Orchard pleaded guilty and received a death sentence in a separate trial, but the sentence was commuted to life in prison. In 1952, at 86 years of age and 45 years after the Haywood trial, Orchard wrote in his autobiography that all of his confession and his trial testimony were true. He died in prison in 1954.

== Legacy ==
Statue of Steunenberg in front of the Idaho State Capitol in Downtown Boise

At the request of the Steunenberg family, attorney Borah gave a brief oration at the funeral in Caldwell on January 2, 1906.

A monument to Steunenberg was dedicated in December 1927 in Boise; the outdoor bronze statue faces the front steps of the Idaho State Capitol from across Jefferson Street. Its inscription is as follows:

Frank Steunenberg

Governor of Idaho
1897 – 1900

When in 1899 organized lawlessness challenged the power of Idaho, he upheld the dignity of the state, enforced its authority and restored LAW AND ORDER within its boundaries, for which he was assassinated in 1905.
"Rugged in body, resolute in mind, massive in the strength of his convictions, he was of the granite hewn." In grateful memory of his courageous devotion to public duty, the people of Idaho have erected this monument.

The quote is from Borah's oration at the funeral in 1906.

== See also ==
- Steve Adams, accused accomplice
- Frank R. Gooding, Idaho Governor during assassination and trials
- List of assassinated American politicians

Party political offices
Preceded by Edward A. Stevenson	Democratic nominee for Governor of Idaho; 1896, 1898	Succeeded by Frank W. Hunt
Political offices
Preceded by William J. McConnell	Governor of Idaho; 1897–1901	Succeeded by Frank W. Hunt
