= Fremont Wood =

American lawyer (1856–1940)

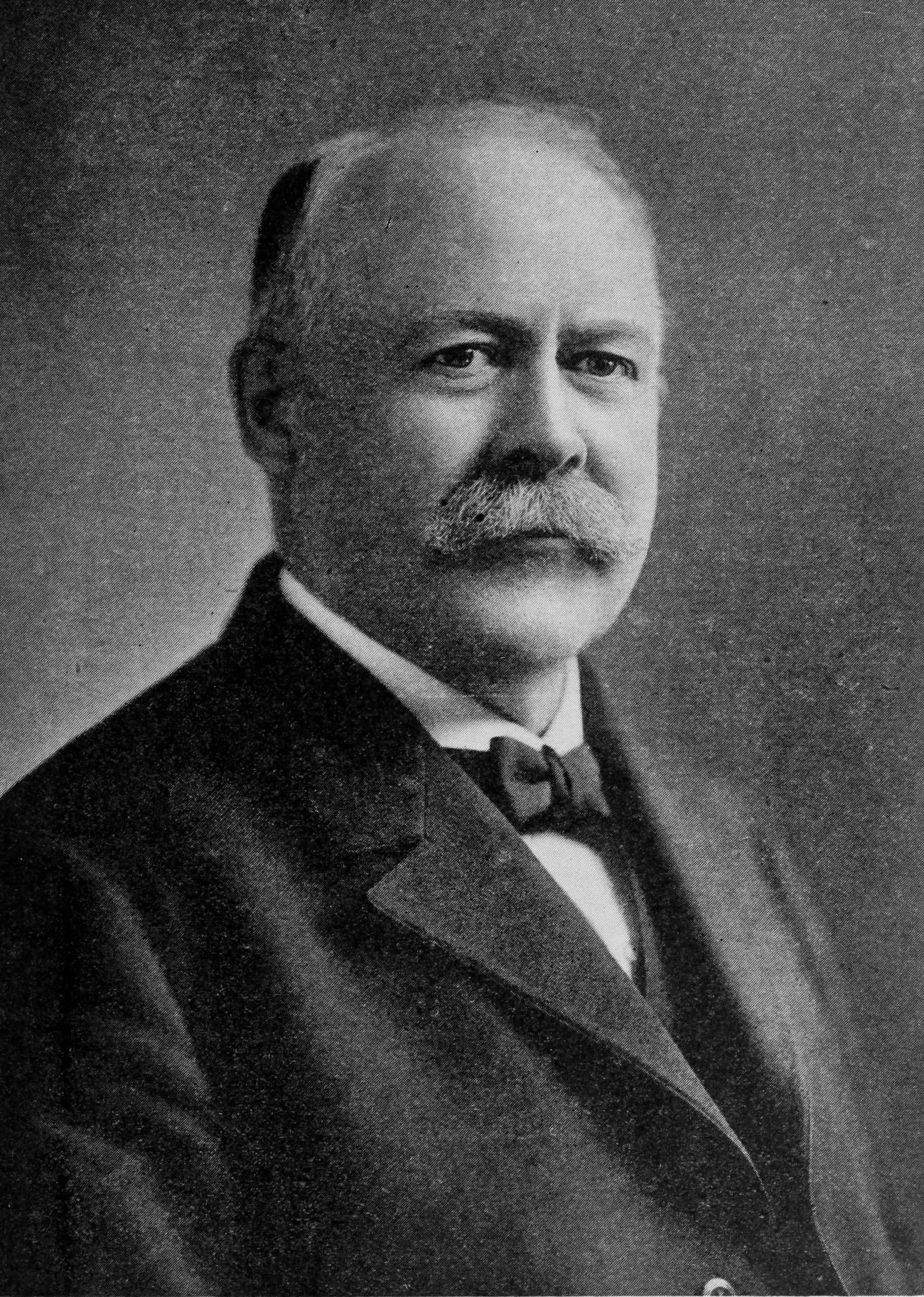
Fremont Wood

Fermont Wood (1856–1940) was an American lawyer and government official who served as the United States Attorney for Idaho Territory from 1889 to 1894. Previous to this he served as the Assistant District Attorney for Idaho Territory from 1881 to 1886. He was a private attorney in Boise during the early 1880s before becoming city solicitor, serving from 1883 to 1884. Wood graduated from Bates College in Lewiston, Maine before entering into private law practice. After retiring from the U.S. Department of Justice, Wood was elected a state judge in Idaho's third district. He presided over the 1907 murder trial of Bill Haywood.

== See also ==
- List of Bates College people
