= El Paso County Sheriff's Office (Colorado) =

The El Paso County Sheriff's Office (EPSO), founded in 1861, handles law enforcement in El Paso County, Colorado. The Office is headed by the County Sheriff, an elected official.

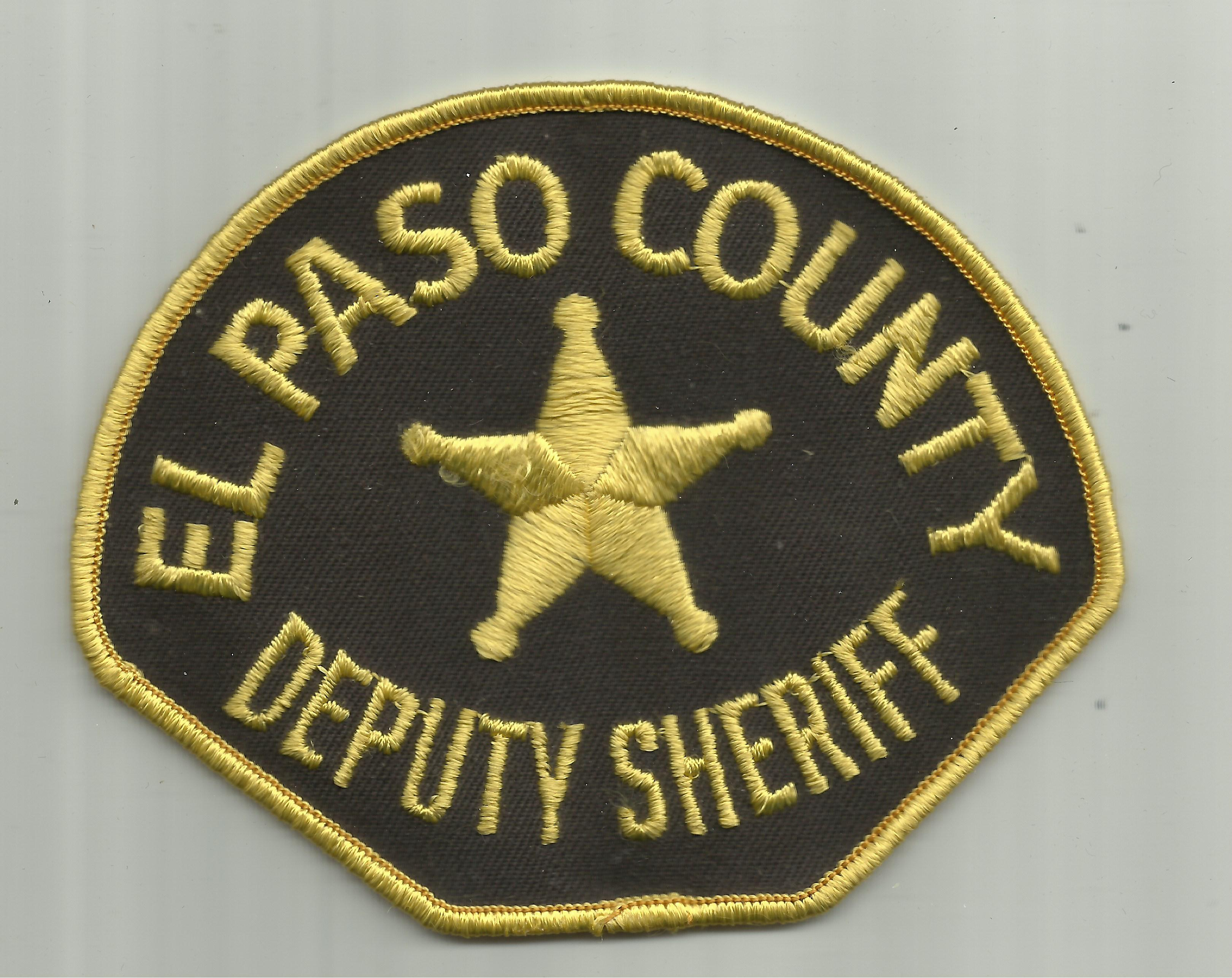
Deputy Sheriff patch

== Sheriff history ==
No.	Last	First	Party	Start date	Finish date	Notes
29	Roybal	Joseph J.	Republican	January 10, 2023 (oath taken)		
28	Elder	Bill	Republican	January 1, 2015	January 10, 2023	
27	Maketa	Terry	Republican	2002	December 31, 2014	resigned by retirement amid a scandal; served 3 terms as Sheriff after a change from 2 to 3 as the maximum
26	Anderson	John Wesley	Republican	January 10, 1995	2003	nephew of 24th Sheriff, Red Davis
25	Barry	Bernard "Bernie" J.	Republican	1983	1995	took over after Davis' death then subsequently elected; resigned amid a racial slur scandal
24	Davis	? L. "Red"	Republican	1979	1983	died while in office previously Sheriff of Colorado Springs, CO.; first name as "Herald" or "Richard" in official documents
23	Shipley	Marion M.	Republican	1975	1978	
22	Sullivan	Earl L.	Republican	<=1956	1975	
21	Short	Norman E.	Democrat	January 1949	>=1953	
20	Slocum	Ray H.	Republican	1947	January 1949	
19	Deal	Samuel J.	Democrat	1935	>=1945	won reelection in 1936
18	Jackson	Robert M.	Republican	1927	1934	won reelection in 1930
17	Berkley	Samuel "Sam" R.	Democrat	1923	1926	won reelection in 1924
16	Weir	John Hamilton	Republican	1917	1922	
15	Birdsall	George G.	Republican	1909	1917	
14	Grimes	Oliver P.	Republican	April 30, 1904	1908	appointed in 1904 after Gilbert resigned,
13	Gilbert	William R.	Republican	January 14, 1902 (noon)	April 30, 1904	sheriff in 1901 (?) See Colorado Labor Wars.
12	Goddard	Donald C.	"Fusionist"	1900	January 14, 1902 (noon)	Goddard was nominated under a so-called Fusionist ticket that merged Democrats and Populists.
11	Boynton	Winfield Scott	Republican	1896	January 1900 (?)	; retired
10	Bowers	M. F.	Republican	<=1892	1896	See Cripple Creek miners' strike of 1894.
9	Jackson	Leonard	Republican	>=November 1887	1891	was Sheriff in 1888
8	Dana	L. C.	Republican	c. March 1882	>=November 1887	appointed sheriff after Smith resigned; was Sheriff in 1886
7	Smith	Walt H.	Republican	January 13, 1880	c. March 1882	; left post to be U.S. Marshal, succeeded by his deputy
6	Becker	Peter	Democrat	September 1875 (Note: The Colorado Springs Gazette starts listing Becker as Sheriff on September 25, 1875 whereas it listed Donnelly as Sheriff the week prior on September 18, 1875. The election itself was on September 1875's second Tuesday, which was September 14, 1875. The latest official mention of Donnelly as Sheriff is at least September 17, 1875 and the earliest mention of Becker as Sheriff is no later than December 1, 1875. This is unusual as most of the El Paso sheriffs take office in January. It is unclear why Becker seems to be acting officially as Sheriff earlier than January 1876 but all information is consistent with the Colorado Springs Gazette's listings.)	January 13, 1880	
5	Donnelly	Robert	Democrat	c. January 1874	September 1875	elected in September 1873
4	Eubank	Cornelius	Democrat	1871?	c. January 1874	appointed; lost reelection in September 1873; still Sheriff by November 29, 1873
?	Templeton	A. J.	Republican	1868?	1871 ?	; possibly dubious entry (eg, perhaps just deputy)
?	Spielman	David	Republican (?)	186?	186?	; possibly dubious entry (there's seems to be no contemporary mention of him)
?	Shapter	?		186?	186?	; possibly dubious entry (eg, perhaps just deputy)
1	Kelley	Rankin Scott		1861	1867	; named sometimes spelled "Kelly"
