= Junius J. Johnson =

American labor leader (died 1898)

Junius James Johnson (died 1898) was a West Point cadet who became a miner, and later played a significant role in the Cripple Creek miners' strike of 1894.

Junius J. Johnson was born in Lexington, Kentucky. He attended West Point for three years, but was dismissed in his fourth year for engaging in hazing. Moving west, he was a miner in Aspen and Cripple Creek.

== Role in the Cripple Creek strike ==
Johnson played a key role in the Cripple Creek miners' strike of 1894. Local union president John Calderwood had left the region as the strike began, touring the state of Colorado to raise money for the striking workers. He left Johnson in charge. Thinking like a military tactician, Johnson immediately seized the high ground and ordered the miners to move to the top of Bull Hill, which overlooked the town of Altman. He ordered that fortifications be built, a commissary stocked and the miners be drilled in maneuvers.

The mine owners had resolved to break the strike through force. They met secretly with the local sheriff and offered to subsidize a force of a hundred or so men to be deputized. The sheriff agreed to raise the required number of recruits, and immediately began contacting ex-police and ex-firefighters in Denver.

Violence broke out on May 25, 1894. At about 9 a.m., 125 deputies arrived in the town of Altman and started to march toward the miner's camp. At that moment, the miners blew up the shafthouse and steam boiler of the Strong mine. The deputies fled to the rail station and left town.

A celebration broke out among the miners. Liquor warehouses and saloons were broken into, and a drunken revel began. Some miners wanted to blow up every mine in the region, but Johnson quickly discouraged them:

But Mr. Johnson, with the help of his aids, had been working constantly, asserting his authority and endeavoring in every way possible to quiet the men. At last he succeeded by diverting their attention toward attacking the deputies, in getting control of them, and the danger was avoided. (Rastall, p. 34)

Johnson even went so far as to imprison some of the men who had been most vocal in encouraging violence, and had the miners drive non-union troublemakers from the region. Calderwood returned late in the evening of May 25 and helped Johnson restore calm.

Johnson continued to prep the strikers for action. 'Courts' were established to try and punish miners who were drunk or advocated violence. Pickets were set up throughout the region, and Johnson received regular reports every hour of the day regarding traffic in and out of the towns in the valley. Huts were built and food served to care for the miners encamped on Bull Hill and throughout the region.

Talks between the miners and the mine owners led to an agreement on June 4. But by this time, the mine owners had paid the local sheriff to raise another 1,200 deputies. Governor Waite declared the force of deputies to be illegal and disbanded, but the sheriff said he could no longer control the men. Waite ordered that the state militia restore order in the region.

Johnson's preparations averted disaster again. On the morning of June 5, the force of ex-deputies attempted to charge the miners on Bull Hill. Johnson's pickets alerted the miners encampment, allowing them to sound the Victor Mine's steam whistle. The alarm brought the state militia to the hill in time to intercept the men and stop their advance.

Johnson's role in suppressing violence on the evening of May 25, 1894, is difficult to overestimate. But some scholars argue that Johnson saved the strike:

The miners' unions, and the people of the state in general, owe a debt of gratitude to Mr. Johnson for his heroic work on that day. Had hundreds of drink-crazed men broken loose with unlimited whiskey and unlimited dynamite, the result had defied description. Scarcely a mine in the district would have been left whole, and one may hardly hazard a guess as to other consequences. (Rastall, p. 34)

Governor Waite, a Populist, was sympathetic to the miners' cause. But public opinion blamed the union for the violence at Cripple Creek. Had warfare between the miners and deputies broken out, Waite would have been forced to break the strike and the outcome of the Cripple Creek job action would have been dramatically different.

== Later life ==
Junius J. Johnson left Colorado after the Cripple Creek strike to avoid arrest. He need not have done so: Mass arrests of miners did occur, but only four strikers were ever tried and all were pardoned.

Johnson settled in Little Rock, Arkansas. When the Spanish–American War broke out in 1898, he was appointed a colonel of an Arkansas regiment. He died as his troops made the journey to the port of embarkation.
