= Dennison, Arizona =

Former railroad stop in Coconino County, Arizona, US

- Railroad stop
- Location within the state of Arizona Dennison, Arizona (the United States)
- Coordinates: 35°05′12″N 110°54′18″W
- Country: United States
- State: Arizona
- County: Coconino
- Elevation: 5,013 ft (1,528 m)
- Time zone: UTC-7 (Mountain (MST))
  - Summer (DST): UTC-7 (MST)
- Area code: 928
- FIPS code: 04-18585
- GNIS feature ID: 24398

Dennison was a stop on the Atchison, Topeka and Santa Fe Railway between Canyon Diablo, and Winslow, Arizona, United States, in Coconino County. Formerly in Yavapai County, it came to be in Coconino County upon the latter's creation in 1891. Dennison was named for a railroad roadmaster named Denny.

It has an estimated elevation of 5,013 feet (1,528 m) above sea level. A short distance west of Dennison siding, the Kaibab Limestone that is predominant in the western part of the state first rises above the limestone Moenkopi Formation found to the east.

In 1910, the railroad was double-tracked from Winslow, Arizona, to a point two miles west of Dennison.

By 1972, Dennison was only a phone station on the railroad line. At that time, the name had fallen out of public use, and local landowners successfully petitioned the county to change the name of Dennison Road, exit 239 on Interstate 40, to Red Gap Ranch Road and Meteor City Road.

== Incidents ==
On 1 September 1891 two men were killed on the line between Dennison and Winslow when a wagon carrying blasting powder on a freight train exploded.

On 28 March 1899, track walker George Smiley shot and killed Dennison section foreman, Paul McSweeney, following a dispute over unpaid wages. Smiley was executed on 8 January the following year.

On 1 July 1899 a light engine ran into the back of a freight train in the siding at Dennison, killing a brakeman and an engineer.
