= Emma F. Langdon =

American labor leader

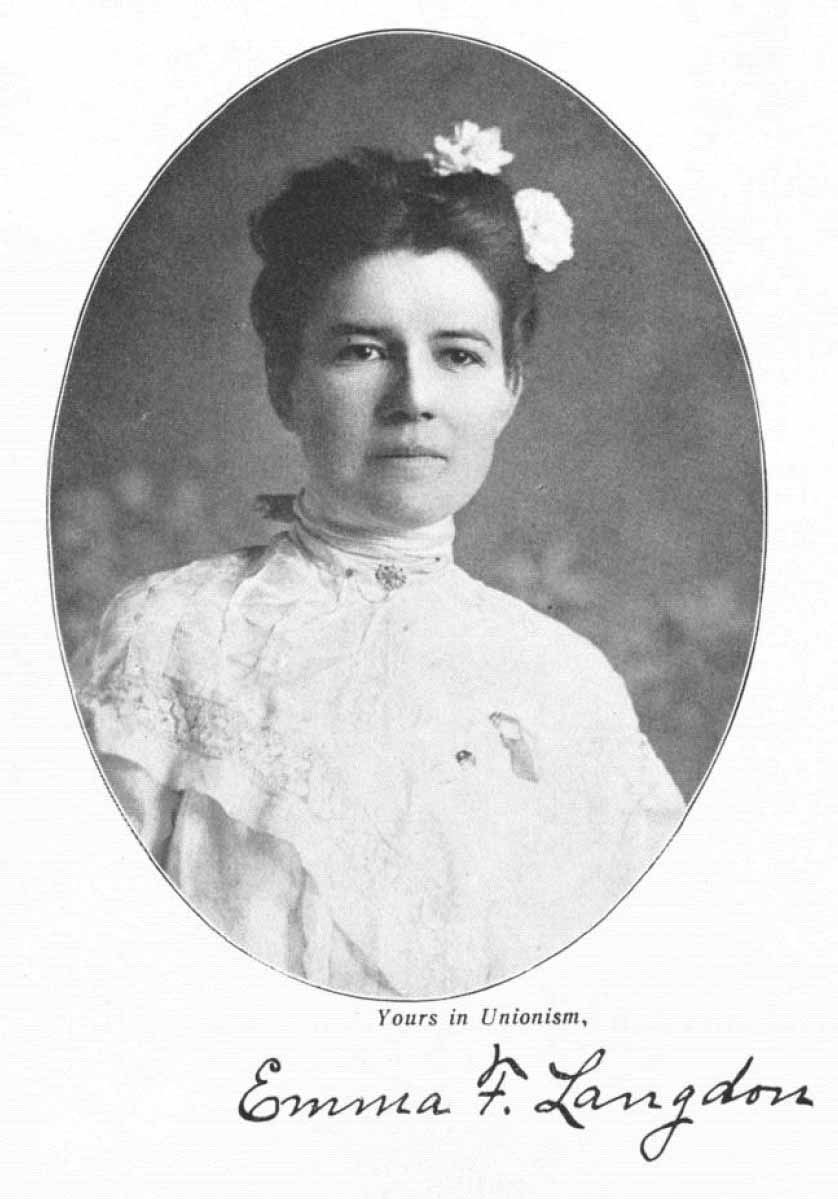
Emma Langdon, 1908. Photo from her book, The Industrial Wars in Colorado.

Emma Florence Langdon (1875 – November 29, 1937) moved to the gold mining district of Cripple Creek, Colorado in 1903. She was an apprentice linotype operator who wrote that "women's place should be in the home and not in public life." In spite of such sentiments, she played a very visible role during some very turbulent times. She and her husband were working at the Victor Daily Record, a pro-union newspaper, during a 1903-04 strike of miners in the Cripple Creek gold fields that erupted into the Colorado Labor Wars. Along with many other union sympathizers, Langdon was forced to leave in 1904, and moved to Denver.

== History ==
Republican governor of Colorado James Peabody had sent the national guard into Cripple Creek to suppress the strike. The Daily Record erroneously charged that one of the soldiers was an ex-convict. Its staff was imprisoned by the national guard in a bullpen before a retraction could be published. While Victor Daily Record editor George Kyner and four printers were in the bullpen, Emma Langdon, a linotype operator married to one of the imprisoned printers, sneaked into the Daily Record office and barricaded herself inside. She printed the next edition of the paper, and then delivered it to the prisoners in the bullpen.

Langdon was the only linotype operator in Victor who was overlooked by the national guard. She received a telephone message at midnight about the raid, and rushed to the office, barred the doors, and printed a four-page edition of the morning paper, with the headline across the top — Somewhat Disfigured but Still in the Ring. The next morning Emma Langdon arrived at the bullpen with an armload of papers intended for the prisoners. She was stopped by the guards. She recorded in her 1908 book, Labors' Greatest Conflicts, that the national guard officers were,

...discussing with glee the "great victory in suppressing the paper." Their laughter was soon changed to oaths when they were dramatically presented the papers that were intended for the imprisoned printers.

The Associated Press picked up the story of the apprentice printer who could not be intimidated.

The Daily Record did not miss an issue as a result of the arrests. The printers were held for twenty-four hours, charged with criminal libel, and then were released on bond. When the cases went to court, all charges were dismissed.

For defying the militia and producing an issue of the union paper by herself, Langdon was presented with an engraved gold medal at the Western Federation of Miners convention in 1904, and was made an honorary member of the union. Although the designation was somewhat overused in the period, Langdon was frequently referred to as Labor's Joan of Arc.

== Affiliations ==
Langdon was secretary of the Victor Women's Auxiliary, vice-president of the Victor Trades Assembly, a member of the Typographical Union in Victor, and later of TU Local No. 49 in Denver. She became chair of the Typographical Union executive board.

She attended the 1905 founding convention of the Industrial Workers of the World in Chicago, where she was elected assistant secretary under general secretary-treasurer William Trautmann.

Emma Langdon became a publicist for the Western Federation of Miners, and was also with the organization when it changed its name to the International Union of Mine, Mill, and Smelter Workers. She was also an organizer for the Socialist Party of America.

== Books authored ==
- Langdon, Emma Florence (1905). The Cripple Creek Strike: A History of Industrial Wars in Colorado (1905 ed.). Denver: Great Western Publishing Co.
  - Multiple editions were printed (e.g., 1903–1904, and 1905). The book is considered one of the "100 BEST BOOKS ON COLORADO" as compiled by Thomas J. Noel (“Dr. Colorado”), Professor of History and Director of Colorado Studies and Public History, University of Colorado–Denver. John Calderwood contributed a chapter which is regarded as a rare first-person account of the Cripple Creek miners' strike of 1894. The first edition of the book is itself quite rare, many copies having been destroyed in the "riot."
