= Tarsney =

Tarsney is a surname. Notable people with the surname include:

- John Charles Tarsney, a politician from the U.S. state of Missouri; also served on the Oklahoma Territory Supreme Court (1893-1896)
- Timothy E. Tarsney, a politician from the U.S. State of Michigan
- Thomas J. Tarsney, a politician from the U.S. State of Colorado
