= T. J. Tarsney =

Thomas J. Tarsney (1846 – 1902?) was a Populist politician and author in Colorado in the late 19th century.

== Early life and political career ==
Tarsney was born in Ohio, but later moved to Pueblo, Colorado.

With Governor Davis H. Waite and Lieutenant Governor Francis Carney, Tarsney was one of the organizers of the Populist party in Colorado. He was a strong advocate for the coinage of both gold and silver, and was outraged by what he perceived as the distortions practiced by advocates of the gold standard in the election of 1876.

Tarsney was elected adjutant general of the Colorado state militia in April 1893 for a two-year term.

=== Cripple Creek Strike ===
During the Cripple Creek miners' strike of 1894, Governor Waite, a 67-year-old Populist, dispatched 300 troops to the Cripple Creek area on March 18 under the command of Adjutant General Tarsney after the local sheriff had declared that the region was in chaos. Tarsney found the area tense but quiet. John Calderwood, president of the local affiliate of the Western Federation of Miners, assured Tarsney that union members would peacefully surrender for arrest, if that is what Tarsney wished.

In his report to the governor, Tarsney described the situation:

Early in the day General Brooks and myself were asked to a conference with the officials of the county and the businessmen of Cripple Creek, whom we met to the number of perhaps 30 at the Palace Hotel. They represented to us the terrible conditions existing in the city and the adjacent mining camps, representing that there was no safety for life or property in either, and declaring that the civil authorities were unable to preserve the peace; that the roads and trails were guarded by armed men, openly defying the officers of the law. The sheriff of the county, Mr. M.F. Bowers, was present, and declared his inability to serve the processes of the courts. A careful inquiry into these affairs by General Brooks and myself disclosed the fact that no person in the county had been charged with the commission of any offence in regard to the existing labor troubles, and that no warrant or other process of court had ever issued, and that neither the sheriff nor his deputies had been resisted in any way, nor had Sheriff Bowers ever been, nor had he ever sought to go to Bull Hill, where it was alleged the trouble existed. After this conference I told Sheriff Bowers that the troops were there at his solicitation, but only in aid of the civil authority in the service of process; that on his own showing no process had issued from the courts, the military was not subject to his order, and that the facts in the case would at once be made known to the governor. (Biennial Report of the Adjutant General, 1894.)

Convinced that the sheriff had wildly exaggerated the extent of the chaos in the region, Tarsney recommended that the troops be pulled out. Waite concurred. The state militia left Cripple Creek on March 20.

But when the strike persisted, the sheriff—in collusion with mine owners—recruited a force of 1,300 hooligans to become deputies and break the strike. Although the mine owners and union had reached an agreement ending the strike, the deputies remained in Cripple Creek.

Governor Waite ordered the force of deputies disbanded, but the sheriff told Tarsney he was no longer able to control the private army he had created. On June 5, the deputies moved into the local town of Altman, cutting telegraph and telephone wires and imprisoning a number of reporters. Aware that the paramilitary force might get out of hand, Waite had already dispatched the state militia, under the command of General E.J. Brooks and Adjutant General Tarsney, to Cripple Creek.

The Colorado state troops arrived in the Cripple Creek region early on the morning of June 6, but more violence had already broken out. The sheriff began to argue with Brooks and Tarsney about what course of action to take. But when the 'deputies' attempted to charge the miners, soldiers of the state militia quickly intercepted them and stopped their advance.

The sheriff's force committed more violence in the town of Cripple Creek. But by nightfall, Brooks had seized the town and corralled all the deputies. After consulting with Tarsney, Gen. Brooks threatened to declare martial law and keep his troops in the region for another 30 days. Meeting with Tarsney, the mine owners capitulated and disbanded their private army. Gen. Brooks dispatched the 'deputies' via rail to Colorado Springs, where they began dispersing on June 11.

Tarsney became widely hated in Colorado for the role he played in protecting the miners' union. On June 22, 1894, he was staying in the Alamo Hotel in Colorado Springs. Just after midnight, a group of men kidnapped him and took him several miles north of the city. They stripped him, tarred and feathered him, and left him to find his own way back to civilization.

== Published works by T.J. Tarsney ==
- An Appeal to Reason: A Plea for Gold and Silver—Not One, But Both... Durango, CO: Hutt & Casey, 1897.

== Sources ==
- Biennial Report of the Adjutant General, Colorado, 1893-1894. Denver: Office of the Adjutant General, 1894.
- 'Francis Carney.' Denver Post. May 5, 1902.
- Holbrook, Stewart. The Rocky Mountain Revolution. New York: Henry Holt and Company, 1956.
- Rastall, Benjamin McKie. 'The labor history of the Cripple Creek district; a study in industrial evolution.' Bulletin of the University of Wisconsin. No. 198. February 1908. Cornell Library Historical Monographs
- Suggs, Jr., George G. Colorado's War on Militant Unionism: James H. Peabody and the Western Federation of Miners. 2nd ed. Norman, OK: University of Oklahoma Press, 1991. ISBN 0-8061-2396-6
