= M. F. Bowers =

M. F. Bowers was an American lawman. He was the sheriff of El Paso County, Colorado, from 1894 to 1896. Prior to becoming sheriff, Bowers had been a saloon bouncer and a night marshal in the town of Altman, Colorado.

Bowers is known for assisting in an attempt to suppress a mine workers' strike. During the Cripple Creek miners' strike of 1894, Bowers attempted to get Governor Davis H. Waite to send in the state militia after the first day of the strike by wildly exaggerating the chaos in the Cripple Creek area. After 300 state troops arrived, Adjutant General T. J. Tarsney found the area calm and ordered his soldiers back to their barracks. Acting independently, Bowers then arrested the mayor and town marshal of Altman as well as a number of miners, in an attempt to crush the morale of the strikers, but a short trial acquitted them of any charges

Bowers later secretly met with mine owners, and agreed to receive a large sum of money to equip a force of 125 men to act as deputies. These men would protect a large force of strikebreakers soon to arrive in the area. News of the agreement soon leaked to the outraged miners. On May 25, 1894, the deputies attempted to raid a striker's camp atop Bull Hill but fled when a nearby mine was blown up. That night, the mine owners offered to pay for wages and equipment for another 1,200 deputies. Bowers agreed to raise the force, which he did by hiring rowdies from around the state of Colorado.

Governor Waite ordered the force of more than 1,300 deputies disbanded, but Bowers did not do so. A few days later, after an agreement had been reached ending the strike, Bowers had lost control of his paramilitary force. The 'deputies' turned on the local towns, terrorizing the citizens. Governor Waite ordered the state militia to restore law and order. As Bowers disputed control of the region with the general in charge of the state troops, the 'deputies' attempted to charge the miners' camp again. Only the quick intervention of the state militia prevented a bloodbath.
