= John Calderwood =

John Calderwood was a Scottish-born American miner, and influential labor union leader, who led miners organized by the Western Federation of Miners to victory in the Cripple Creek miners' strike of 1894. Little is known about his parentage or life.

== Early years ==
Calderwood was born in Kilmarnock, East Ayrshire, Scotland, and went to work in the local coal mines at the age of nine while attending public night school. After emigrating to the United States at age 17, he attended Mckeesport School of Mines in McKeesport, Pennsylvania, graduating in 1876.

After graduation, Calderwood settled in Colorado. He was elected president of a miners' union in Aspen. In November 1893, he traveled to Cripple Creek, Colorado at the behest of the Western Federation of Miners (WFM) to organize miners there.

== Cripple Creek strike ==
Calderwood was president of the newly formed WFM during the Cripple Creek miners' strike of 1894. As the strike began, Calderwood left for Salt Lake City, Utah, to attend the second convention of the WFM. His departure fortuitously left Junius J. Johnson, a former U.S. Army officer, in charge of the union. Johnson's planning and cool head helped the miners weather the initial assault by gangs of hired thugs sent to break the strike. Calderwood arrived back in Cripple Creek on the third day of the strike, and took control again. The strike was a major success.

== Later life ==
After the strike, Calderwood continued as president of the union. Blacklisted and unable to find employment as a miner, he worked as an assayer. Calderwood retired as president of the local union in 1901, and was succeeded by John Curry. In 1897, Calderwood was one of 37 men who formed the Victor Elks Lodge, No. 367. Calderwood was the First Secretary.

Calderwood wrote about his experiences during the Cripple Creek strike in 1905. Emma Langdon was the wife of a man who had been a newspaper reporter in Victor, Colorado, during the Cripple Creek miners' strike of 1903–04. Her husband had been wrongfully imprisoned by the state militia in a notorious bullpen. Outraged, Langdon wrote and published a book about the 1903–04 strike. Calderwood contributed a chapter to the book, providing background about the 1894 strike. It is the most comprehensive first-person discussion of the strike to be published.
