= Track checker =

Specialized type of railway carriage

A track checker is a small railway carriage used to audit the gauge and integrity of railway tracks. Railroads such as those in the United States and Ireland use track checkers.

The first track checkers were simply people that walked the tracks, making sure that the tracks were not damaged and that the switches were working. People in this role were known as a track walker. Track walkers are still employed by the Metropolitan Transportation Authority maintaining New York City Subway lines.

A modern track checker is a small carriage on wheels, which can be automated or driven by one engineer, who is also known as a "track checker." This carriage, reaching speeds of 30 to 60 mph (48.3 to 96.6 km/h), drives along the tracks of a railway.
