= 1894 Cripple Creek miners' strike =

Labor strike by the Western Federation of Miners in Colorado

Cripple Creek miners' strike
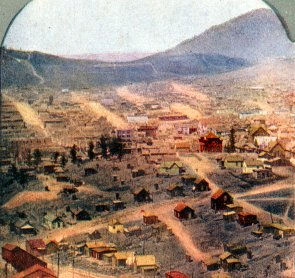
- View of Cripple Creek, c. 1900
- Date: February 7 – June 12, 1894
- Location: Cripple Creek, Colorado
- Goals: Wages
- Methods: Strikes, protest, demonstrations

Parties
Miners; Western Federation of Miners	Federal troops

Lead figures
John Calderwood; Junius J. Johnson; Davis H. Waite	M. F. Bowers

Casualties and losses
Deaths: 1 Injuries: Arrests: 300	Deaths: 1 Injuries: Arrests:

The Cripple Creek miners' strike of 1894 was a five-month strike by the Western Federation of Miners (WFM) in Cripple Creek, Colorado, United States. It resulted in a victory for the union and was followed in 1903 by the Colorado Labor Wars. It is notable for being the only time in United States history when a state militia was called out (May/June 1894) in support of striking workers.

The strike was characterized by firefights and use of dynamite, and ended after a standoff between the Colorado state militia and a private force working for owners of the mines. In the years after the strike, the WFM's popularity and power increased significantly through the region.

== Causes of the strike ==
At the end of the 19th century, Cripple Creek was the largest town in the gold-mining district that included the towns of Altman, Anaconda, Arequa, Goldfield, Elkton, Independence and Victor, about 20 miles from Colorado Springs on the southwest side of Pikes Peak. Surface gold was discovered in the area in 1891, and within three years more than 150 mines were operating there.

The 1893 economic depression led to the price of silver to crash, while the gold price remained stable, leading to the movement of workers from silver mines to gold producing areas. Cripple Creek's mines remained in full production during this period, but the influx of labor produced downward pressure on wages which some mine owners sought to exploit.

In January 1894, Cripple Creek mine owners J. J. Hagerman, David Moffat and Eben Smith, who together employed one-third of the area's miners, announced a lengthening of the work-day to ten hours (from eight), with no change to the daily wage of $3.00 (~$112.00 in 2025) per day. When workers protested, the owners agreed to employ the miners for eight hours a day – but at a wage of only $2.50.

Not long before this dispute, miners at Cripple Creek had formed the Free Coinage Union. Once the new changes went into effect, they affiliated with the Western Federation of Miners, and became Local 19. The union was based in Altman, and had chapters in Anaconda, Cripple Creek and Victor.

On February 1, 1894, the mine owners began implementing the 10-hour day. Union president John Calderwood issued a notice a week later demanding that the mine owners reinstate the eight-hour day at the $3.00 wage. When the owners did not respond, the nascent union struck on February 7. Portland, Pikes Peak, Gold Dollar and a few smaller mines immediately agreed to the eight-hour day and remained open, but larger mines held out.

== Events of the strike ==
The strike had an immediate effect. By the end of February, every smelter in Colorado was either closed or running part-time. At the beginning of March, the Gold King and Granite mines gave in and resumed the eight-hour day.

Mine owners still holding out for the 10-hour day soon attempted to re-open their mines. On March 14, they obtained a court injunction ordering the miners not to interfere with the operation of their mines, and hired strikebreakers. The WFM initially attempted to persuade these men to join the union and strike, but when they were unsuccessful, the union resorted to threats and violence. These tactics succeeded in driving non-union miners out of the district.

On March 16, an armed group of miners ambushed and captured six sheriff's deputies en route to the Victor mine. A fight broke out, in which one deputy was shot and another hit by a club. An Altman judge, a member of the WFM, charged the deputies with carrying concealed weapons and disturbing the peace, then released them.

=== Involvement of the state militia ===
After the assault on his deputies, El Paso County (Note: In 1899, after a second WFM strike in Cripple Creek was brutally repressed by the state militia, the far western section of El Paso County was made into its own county. Today, Cripple Creek and the surrounding district lie within Teller County, Colorado.) Sheriff M. F. Bowers wired the governor and requested the intervention of the state militia (predecessor to the Colorado National Guard). Governor Davis H. Waite, a 67-year-old Populist, dispatched 300 troops to the area on March 18 under the command of Adjutant General T. J. Tarsney. Tarsney found the area tense but quiet. Union president Calderwood assured him that union members would cooperate with his operations, even surrendering for arrest if requested. Convinced that Bowers had exaggerated the extent of the chaos in the region, Tarsney recommended the withdrawal of troops; Waite concurred. The state militia left Cripple Creek on March 20.

In response to the recall of the state militia, the mine owners closed the mines. Bowers arrested Calderwood, 18 other miners, and the mayor and town marshal of Altman (who had supported the miners). They were taken to Colorado Springs and quickly tried on several different charges, but found not guilty. Meanwhile, outbursts of violence, such as stone-throwing and fights between union miners and scabs, increased in frequency. Stores and warehouses were broken into, and guns and ammunition stolen.

In early May, the mine owners met with representatives of the WFM in Colorado Springs in an attempt to end the strike. The owners offered to return to the eight-hour day, but at a daily wage of only $2.75. The union rejected the offer and talks broke down.

=== County sheriff deputizes an army ===
Shortly after negotiations with the union ended, the mine owners met secretly with Sheriff Bowers in Colorado Springs. They told Bowers they intended to bring in hundreds of nonunion workers, and asked if he could protect such a large force of men. Bowers said he could not, for the county lacked the financial resources to pay and arm more than a few deputies. The mine owners offered to subsidize an initial force of a hundred or so men. Bowers agreed, and immediately began recruiting ex-police and ex-firefighters from Denver.

News of the mine owners' meeting with Bowers soon leaked out, and the miners organized and armed themselves in response. Calderwood was leaving on a tour of the WFM locals in Colorado to raise funds for the Cripple Creek strike, and so appointed Junius J. Johnson, a former U.S. Army officer, to take over strike operations. Johnson immediately established a camp atop Bull Hill, which overlooked the town of Altman. He ordered that fortifications be built, a commissary stocked and the miners be drilled in maneuvers.

=== Dynamiting the Strong mine ===
On May 24, the strikers seized the Strong mine on Battle Mountain, which overlooked the town of Victor. The next day, at about 9 am, 125 deputies arrived in Altman and set up camp at the base of Bull Hill. As they started to march toward the strikers' camp, miners at the Strong mine blew up the shafthouse, hurling the structure more than 300 feet into the air. A few moments later, the steam boiler was also dynamited, showering the deputies with timber, iron and cable. The deputies fled to the rail station and left town.

A celebration broke out among the miners, who broke into liquor warehouses and saloons. That night, some of the miners loaded a flatcar with dynamite and attempted to roll it toward the deputies' camp. It overturned short of its goal and killed a cow. Other miners wanted to blow up every mine in the region, but Johnson quickly discouraged them. Frustrated, several drunken miners then stole a work train and steamed into Victor. They caught up with the group of fleeing deputies, and a gun battle broke out. One deputy and one miner died, a man on each side was wounded, and six strikers were captured by the deputies. The miners subsequently captured three officials of the Strong mine who had been present when the shafthouse was blown up. A formal prisoner exchange later freed all held on both sides.

Calderwood returned during the night and restored calm. He asked saloons to close, and he imprisoned several miners who had instigated outbursts of violence.

=== Waite intervenes ===
Warned about the size of the force Bowers was raising, Governor Davis Hanson Waite interceded again in the strike. He issued a proclamation on May 27 in which he called on the miners to disband their encampment on Bull Hill. In a development unparalleled in American labor history, he also declared the force of 1,200 deputies to be illegal and ordered the group disbanded. He also ordered the state militia to be on the alert for a possible move on Cripple Creek. On May 28, the governor visited the miners, who authorized Waite to negotiate on their behalf.

An initial meeting on May 30 nearly ended in disaster. Waite and several local civic leaders called union president Calderwood and mine owners Hagerman and Moffat to a conference in a meeting hall on the campus of Colorado College in Colorado Springs. Talks were under way and proceeding well when a mob of local citizens attempted to storm the building. Blaming Calderwood and Waite for the violence in Cripple Creek, they intended to lynch both men. As a local judge distracted the mob, Calderwood and Waite escaped out a rear door and onto the governor's waiting train.

Negotiations resumed in Denver on June 2, and the parties reached an agreement on June 4. The agreement provided for resumption of the $3.00-per-day wage and the eight-hour day. The mine owners agreed not to retaliate against or prosecute any miner who had taken part in the strike, and the miners agreed not to discriminate against or harass any nonunion worker who remained employed in the mines.

=== The state militia returns ===
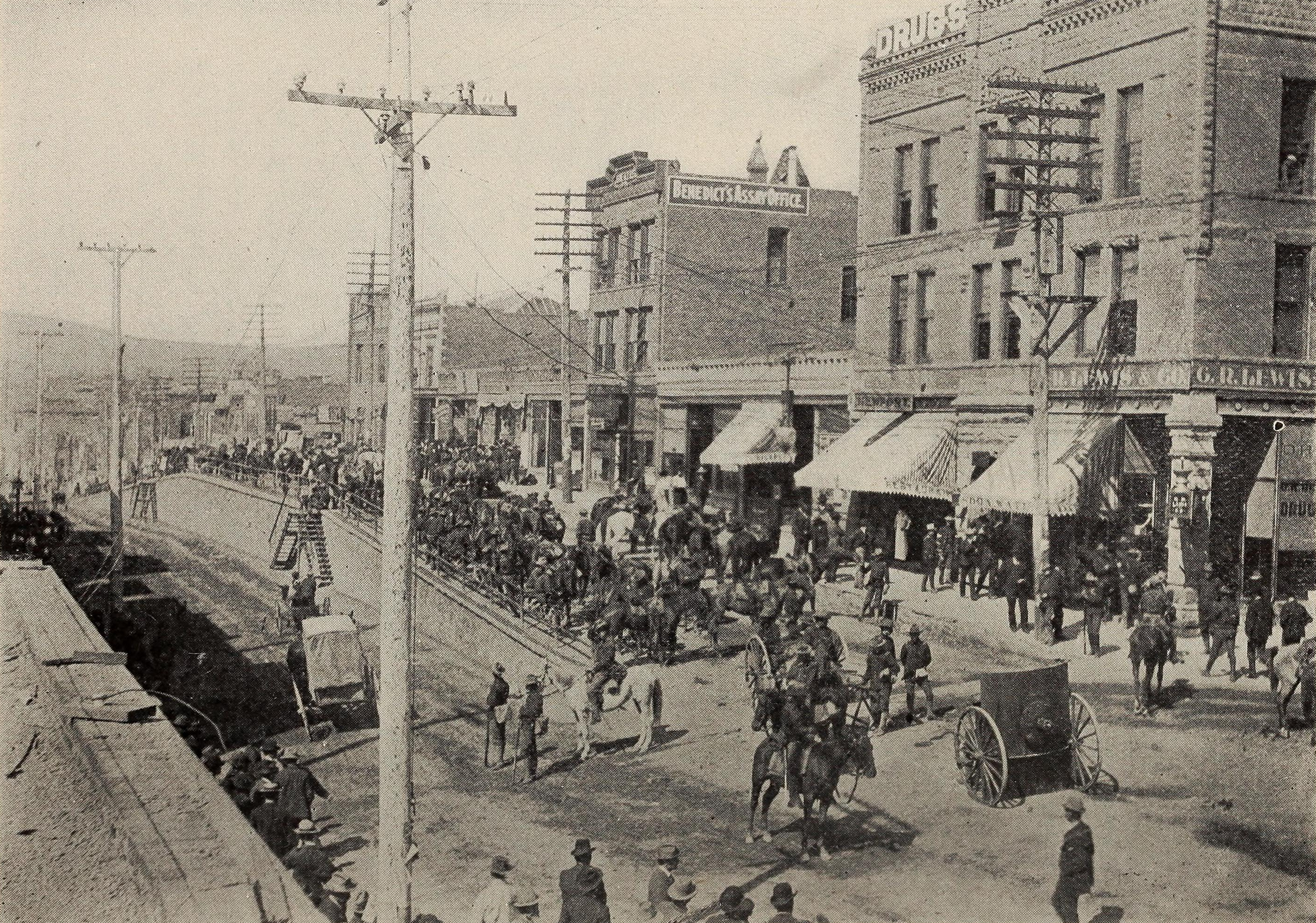
Cripple Creek, Colo., under martial law in 1894.

With 1,300 deputies still in Cripple Creek, Sheriff Bowers was unable to control the army he had created. On June 5, the deputies moved into Altman, perhaps as a prelude to storming Bull Hill. The deputies cut the telegraph and telephone wires leading out of town, and imprisoned a number of reporters. Concerned that the paramilitary force might get out of hand, Waite again dispatched the state militia, this time under the command of General E.J. Brooks.

When Colorado state troops arrived in Cripple Creek early on the morning of June 6, more violence had already broken out. The deputies were exchanging gunfire with the miners on Bull Hill. Gen. Brooks quickly moved his troops from the train station to the foot of Bull Hill. As Sheriff Bowers and Gen. Brooks began to argue about what course of action to take next, the deputies took advantage of the lull and attempted to charge the miners. (Note: Each miner carried a rifle, a cartridge belt and five dynamite charges with percussion caps. The hill had been mined with dynamite as well, and the miners had rigged a ballista capable of throwing Molotov cocktails a quarter-mile. The grade of the hill was steeper than that which faced the British at the Battle of Bunker Hill.) The miners sounded the whistle at the Victor mine, alerting Gen. Brooks. Soldiers of the state militia quickly intercepted the deputies and stopped their advance. Brooks ordered his men to occupy the top of Bull Hill, and the miners offered no resistance.

The deputies turned their attention to Cripple Creek itself. They arrested and imprisoned hundreds of citizens without cause. Many inhabitants of the town were seized on the street or pulled from their homes, then clubbed, kicked or beaten. The deputies formed a gauntlet and forced townspeople to pass through it, spitting, slapping and kicking them. With Bull Hill in his possession, Gen. Brooks began detaining the deputies. By nightfall, Brooks had seized the town and corralled all of Bowers' men.

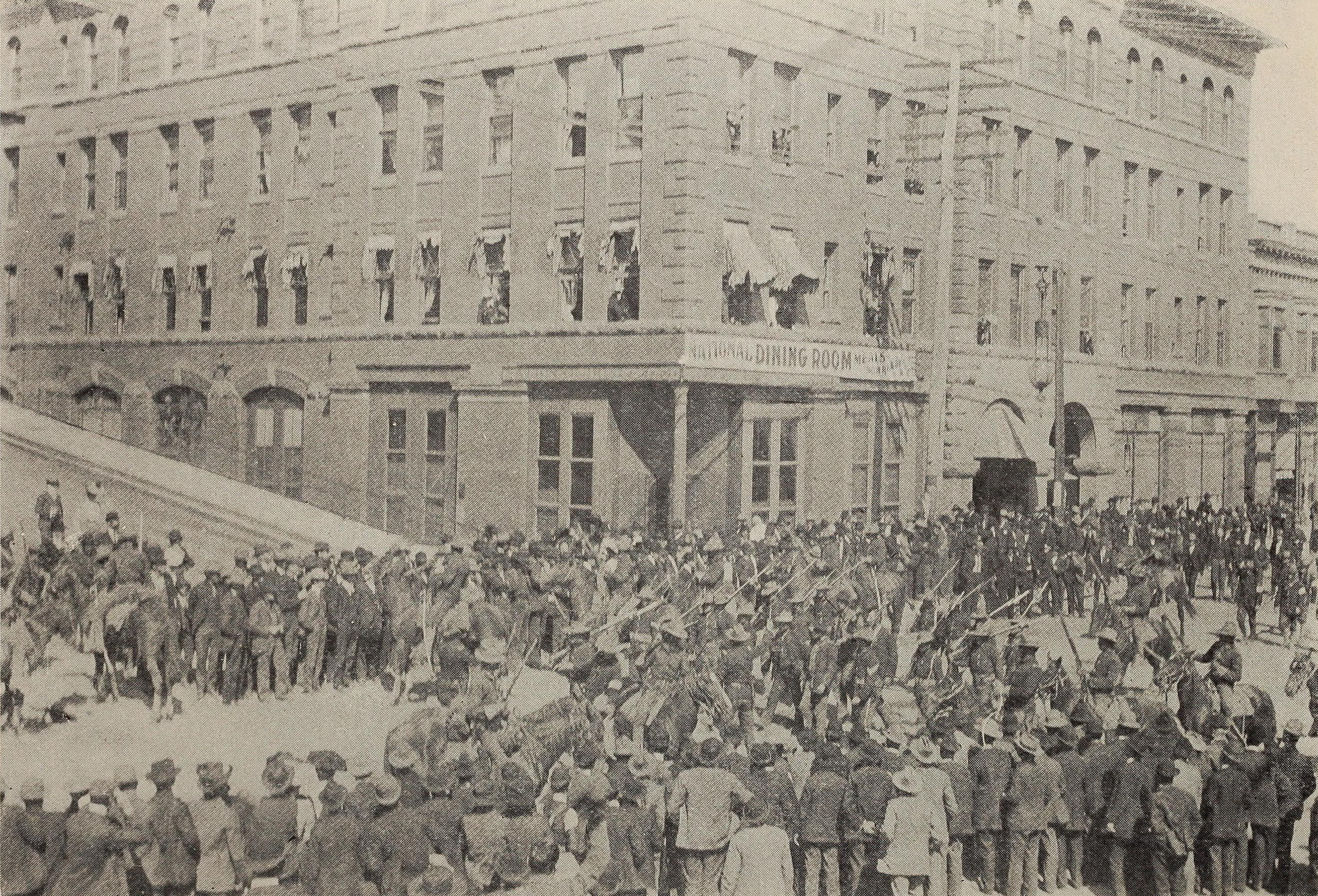
Illegal sheriff's deputies under military guard in Cripple Creek, Colo., 1894

Waite threatened to declare martial law, but the mine owners refused to disband their deputy force. Gen. Brooks then threatened to keep his troops in the region for another 30 days. Faced with the prospect of paying for a paramilitary force which could only sit on its hands, the owners agreed to disband it. The deputies, which Gen. Brooks had dispatched via rail to Colorado Springs, began dispersing on June 11. The Waite agreement became operative the same day, and the miners returned to work.

Union president Calderwood and 300 other miners were arrested and charged with a variety of crimes. Only four miners were convicted of any charges, and were quickly pardoned by the sympathetic populist governor.

== Impact of the strike ==
The Cripple Creek strike was a major victory for the miners' union. The Western Federation of Miners used the success of the strike to organize almost every worker in the Cripple Creek region – including waitresses, laundry workers, bartenders and newsboys – into 54 local unions. The WFM flourished in the Cripple Creek area for almost a decade, even helping to elect most county officials (including the new sheriff).

The Cripple Creek strike also transformed the Western Federation of Miners enormously as a political entity. The year-old union, weak and penniless before the strike, became widely admired among miners throughout the West. Thousands of workers joined the union over the next few years. Politicians and labor officials throughout the country became steady allies of the union, and the WFM became a political force throughout much of the Rocky Mountain West.

But the WFM's success at Cripple Creek also created a significant backlash. The WFM was forever tarred as a dangerous and violent organization in the eyes of employers. Never again would the WFM have in a local strike the level of public support it enjoyed at Cripple Creek in 1894. Indeed, when the union struck the Cripple Creek mines again in 1898, its public support ended after violence broke out. During another strike in 1903–4, whose violent significance earned it the name Colorado Labor Wars, the union went up against the power of the employers and the state combined.

The union's success also altered the course of Colorado politics. Outside of South-West Colorado, and hamstrung by a Republican controlled state legislature, Waite's support for the miners' union led to a loss of support. (Note: Waite was wholly supportive of the Populist program, including that of industrial reform: "Well, what if it [the program] is? Is it not the truth that for thirty years the two old parties have been legislating for the creditor class? It is true, and turn about is fair play.") The backlash led to Waite's defeat at the polls in November 1894 and the election of Republican Albert McIntire. The Populist movement in Colorado never recovered.

The Cripple Creek strike of 1894 also hardened the attitudes of mine owners. Under Gov. McIntire, the government of Colorado formed a political alliance with the mine owners. Mine owners increasingly turned to the Thiel Detective Service Company and Pinkerton National Detective Agency for spies, increased the use of strikebreakers, and implemented the lockout and blacklist as a means of controlling union members.

After a nighttime rifle and dynamite attack by striking miners on two mines during the Leadville Miners' Strike in 1896, which succeeded in burning down the surface works of one of the mines, even the pro-union county sheriff requested Gov. McIntire to send in the state militia, and the WFM lost the strike, and its influence in Leadville. The collapse of the 1896 Leadville strike caused the WFM to sever its relationship with the American Federation of Labor and to turn strongly to the left industrially and politically. After the Colorado Labor Wars, the WFM was instrumental in launching the Industrial Workers of the World (IWW) in 1905, but withdrew in 1907–8.

== See also ==
- Bituminous coal miners' strike of 1894
- Albert Horsley (a.k.a. Harry Orchard)
- Colorado Labor Wars, the WFM strike of 1903–04
- Copper Country strike of 1913–14
