= 1912–1913 Little Falls textile strike =

Textile workers strike in New York, US

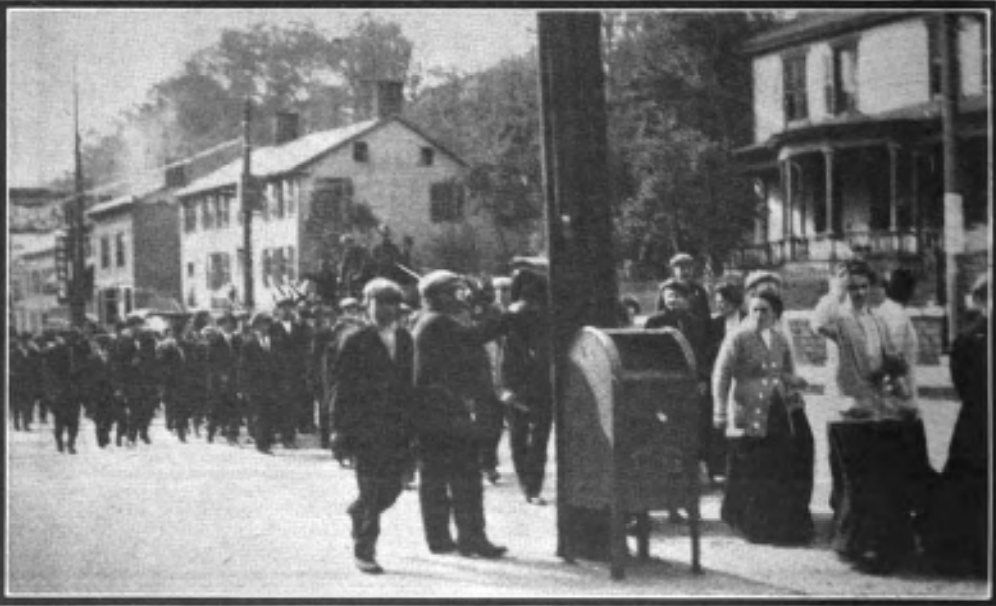
- Strikers on parade shortly after the initial walkout
- Date: October 9, 1912 – January 6, 1913 (2 months and 4 weeks)
- Location: Little Falls, New York, United States
- Caused by: Decrease in wages following a reduction in maximum working hours for women from 60 to 54 hours per week
- Methods: Picketing; Protests; Strike action; Walkout
- Result: Mills agree to pay 60-hour wages for 54-hour workweek, institute changes in piece work pay

Parties
Industrial Workers of the World; Local No. 801 — the National Industrial Union of Textile Workers of Little Falls; United Textile Workers of America; Socialist Party of America	Phoenix Knitting Mill; Gilbert Knitting Mill

Lead figures
Matilda Robbins	

The 1912–1913 Little Falls textile strike was a labor strike involving workers at two textile mills in Little Falls, New York, United States. The strike began on October 9, 1912, as a spontaneous walkout of primarily immigrant mill workers at the Phoenix Knitting Mill following a reduction in pay, followed the next week by workers at the Gilbert Knitting Mill for the same reason. The strike, which grew to several hundred participants under the leadership of the Industrial Workers of the World (IWW), lasted until January the following year, when the mills and the strikers came to an agreement that brought the workers back to the mills on January 6.

Little Falls, a city situated along the Mohawk River, saw substantial growth in its textile industry during the early 1900s. The city's textile mills were primarily operated by immigrant workers from Europe who faced poor living conditions in the city. In 1912, as part of efforts to improve workplace safety, the state government passed a law that lowered the maximum number of weekly working hours for women and children from 60 to 54. However, the law did not address pay, resulting in many workers throughout the state seeing a decrease in wages due to their reduced working hours. In many cases, brief labor disputes led to the companies altering pay rates, but in Little Falls, the Phoenix and Gilbert Knitting Mills resisted, leading to many mill workers receiving less pay than before. As a result, on October 9, 80 workers at the Phoenix Mill performed a walkout, and they were joined on October 18 by 76 workers from the Gilbert Mill. Over the next few days, the number of strikers continued to increase until over 600 workers were on strike.

Shortly after the walkout, Socialist Party members from nearby Schenectady, including that city's Socialist Mayor George R. Lunn, came to Little Falls to help the strikers. Many, including Lunn, were arrested during peaceful rallies at a park near the mills, but after criticism from regional publications and state politicians, the city backed down by late October. Around that same time, the IWW, which had sent organizers to the city near the beginning of the strike, took the lead in organizing the strikers, helping them to form a strike committee, teaching them picketing techniques, and helping to draft a list of demands that included pay increases. On October 24, the strikers voted to officially organize a local union of the IWW in Little Falls. Several days later, on October 30, there was a violent confrontation between law enforcement officials and strikers outside the Phoenix Mill, and in the resulting riot, police raided the strikers' headquarters and arrested many. Following this, IWW officials Matilda Rabinowitz and Bill Haywood came to Little Falls to help continue the strike. Around the same time, the IWW faced competition from the United Textile Workers of America (UTW), which organized its own separate local union and signed a labor contract that brought some mill workers back to work on December 2. However, the IWW local, with about 400 members, stayed out. On December 24, the New York State Department of Labor initiated an investigation into the strike and helped to negotiate a contract that was approved by both the mills and the union. As a result, the IWW members returned to work on January 6, 1913, bringing the strike to a close.

The terms of the contract resulted in wage increases of between 6 and 15 percent for the workers, depending on their piece work pay, and resulted in the strikers receiving their employment back without discrimination. However, over the next several months, the IWW focused a great deal of time and resources into court cases regarding several of those arrested during the strike, and ultimately, two organizers were found guilty of assault and sentenced to a year in prison. As a result of these developments, the IWW local soon fell into a state of disorder, while nationally, the IWW suffered a serious blow to its size and power following the disastrous 1913 Paterson silk strike, which also concerned mill workers. By the 1920s, the IWW had entered into a period of serious decline, while the UTW ramped up its organizing efforts among immigrants in the area. The Little Falls strike was one in a wave of textile strikes in the Northeastern United States that followed the IWW's successful 1912 Lawrence textile strike, and one of numerous IWW-led strikes throughout the Northeast and the Midwest during the 1910s.

== Background ==
=== Industry in Little Falls, New York ===
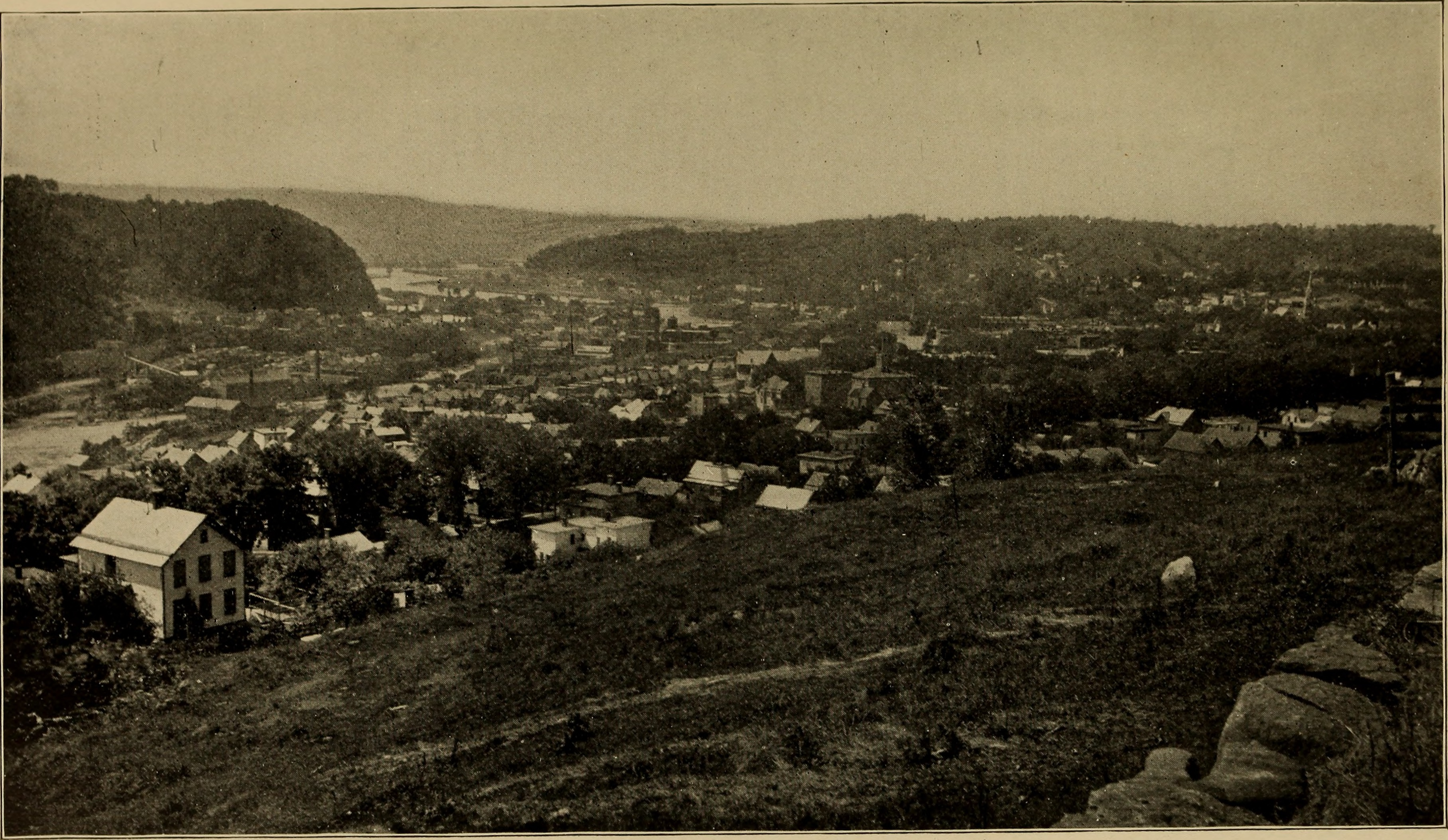
Little Falls, New York, in 1894

Little Falls is a city in Herkimer County, in the Mohawk Valley region of Upstate New York, near Utica. Situated along the banks of the Mohawk River, the city was one of several in the region to have a developed textile industry with multiple textile mills by the beginning of the 20th century. The city's first mill had been organized in 1872, and by 1912, the city was a sizeable center for the production of knitted fabrics and underwear, home to several mills and other manufacturing facilities, earning it the nickname "the Lowell of the Empire State". These mills employed many immigrants from Europe, including many Austrians, Hungarians, Italians, and Poles. Many were not fluent in English. These immigrants were drawn to Little Falls due to the robust economic growth the city was experiencing during the early 1900s, as the economic output of the city grew by 89 percent between 1904 and 1909, with the total value of goods produced during the latter year equal to about $8.5 million. The laborers at these mills often faced poor working conditions, with the mills employing children as young as 5 years old in sweatshop conditions, while their squalid living conditions led to a high rate of tuberculosis among the immigrants. The millworkers lived in tenements that an article in The New York Times compared to "rabbit warrens". The latter had prompted the Fortnightly Club, a local charity organization, to hire M. Helen Schloss to serve as a visiting nurse to treat tuberculosis and other sicknesses in the city.

=== Organized labor ===
During this period of growth in Little Falls, business interests worked to prevent worker unionization, and in 1912, there were only 12 local unions in the city, representing only 6 percent of the population. In the mills, only about 75 jack spinners were unionized, (Note: Jack spinners in the mill operated machinery that spun a cotton strand after it had left the carding machine.) constituting about a quarter of the entire union membership in the city. These spinners, who worked 60 hours per week, made about $2.60 per day, which was higher than the daily pay for spinners in other nearby cities, but the majority of mill workers were not unionized and made substantially less. In a study of the weekly pay of about 800 male workers, almost half made $9 or less, while less than a quarter made over $12. Out of 900 female workers' weekly wages, about half made $7.50 or less, about a fifth made more than $10, and 30 percent made $6 or less. Many workers complained of the low wages, saying that they were insufficient to provide for themselves and their family. Nationwide, union membership remained relatively low, with only about 6 percent of the country's workforce in 1905 affiliated with the American Federation of Labor (AFL), a federation of labor unions that primarily focused on organizing skilled tradesmen into craft unions. AFL leaders were relatively unconcerned with unionizing unskilled workers and viewed immigrant laborers, such as the workers at the mills in Little Falls, as a potential danger to the craft union movement. Also in 1905, the Industrial Workers of the World (IWW, whose members are known as Wobblies), an anarcho-syndicalist union, was established and began to organize unskilled workers in the country into industrial unions. Unionization efforts by the IWW would eventually push the AFL to reconsider their approach to unskilled labor, and the two organizations often engaged in competition to represent workers and lead labor strikes. During the 1910s, the IWW attempted to organize many factories in New York, and they were involved in several labor disputes in the state, such as the 1912 New York City waiters' strike in May of that year. That same year, the union led a strike against the New York Mills Corporation of New York Mills, which involved many Polish immigrants. In the United States during the early 1900s, many Polish workers were receptive to industrial unionism with the IWW and similar militant unions, such as the United Mine Workers of America.

=== Changes to hours and wages ===
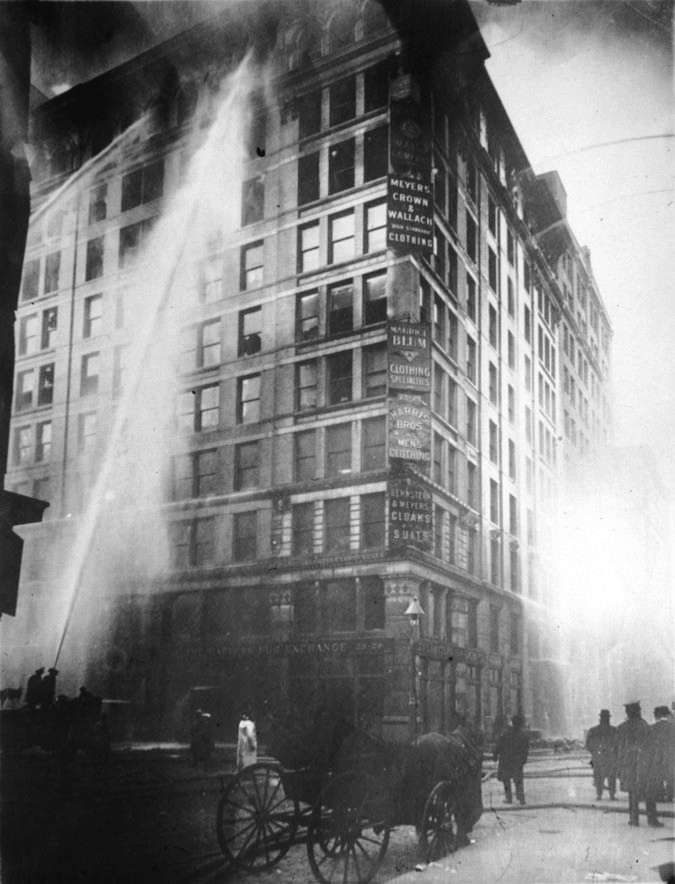
The Jackson bill came after the 1911 Triangle Shirtwaist Factory fire amidst efforts to improve workplace safety.

In 1911, New York State Assembly member Edward D. Jackson of Buffalo proposed legislation that would reduce the maximum number of weekly hours that women and minors could work in factories from 60 to 54. Additionally, the bill would bar them from working between the hours of 9 p.m. and 6 a.m. and prohibit them from working more than ten hours per day. The Jackson bill was opposed by industry interests, who hired lobbyists to attempt to prevent the bill's passage into law. Mill owners argued that the bill would hurt the state's textile industry, while one company that also operated mills in Georgia stated that the law would lead to more work being performed in those locations, where the cap on hours per week that women could work was 66. Meanwhile, organized labor supported the bill, with textile unionist John Golden speaking in favor of its passage. Additional support came from Frances Perkins, head of the New York branch of the National Consumers League, and the New York Child Labor Committee. The bill was proposed amidst a greater push for workplace safety for women following the 1911 Triangle Shirtwaist Factory fire, an industrial disaster in New York City that had killed over 100 women. As part of this movement, the New York State Legislature had also created the Factory Investigating Commission to investigate working conditions in the state, with the commission visiting Little Falls in August 1912. Ultimately, with support from New York Governor John Alden Dix, the bill was approved and signed into law, with an effective date of October 1, 1912.

While the bill had addressed the number of hours that could be worked, the legislation did not address the impact that the change would have on wages. As a result, when the law came into effect, many companies reduced pay in proportion to the decrease in hours worked. This led to numerous and sporadic walkouts throughout the state, with workers objecting to receiving less money. A similar situation had occurred previously in Massachusetts when that state's government had passed a similar law that decreased working hours that similarly led to strikes, including the 1912 Lawrence textile strike. The Lawrence strike, led by the IWW and involving many immigrant workers, such as Poles, had occurred just a few months before the labor disputes in New York. In many cases, the companies were able to quickly resolve these disputes by adjusting wages. In Little Falls, the Phoenix Knitting Mill and the Gilbert Knitting Mill also lowered wages according to the reduced hours, leading to a labor strike at these two mills.

== Course of the strike ==
=== Early strike actions ===
On October 9, 80 workers at the Phoenix Knitting Mill performed a walkout due to the reduced pay they had received. The walkout was a spontaneous action among the workers, who were primarily immigrants such as Italians and Poles. On October 18, 76 workers at the Gilbert Knitting Mill also performed a walkout to protest their reduced wages. Over the next several days, more workers began to honor the picket line, until the number of workers on strike was roughly equal to the number of workers who remained working, with about 664 workers involved in strike action and a further 659 workers indirectly affected by the strike. (Note: Sources vary on the exact number of workers involved in the strike. In a 1979 article published in the journal New York History, historian Robert E. Snyder stated, "664 workers braved inclement weather and entrenched local interests to strike against the Phoenix and Gilbert Knitting Mills, and another 659 workers were indirectly affected by work stoppages". Snyder goes on to state that the number of workers who went on strike was roughly equal to the number who did not. However, in a 1995 book, later partially republished in a 2009 entry for The Encyclopedia of Strikes in American History, historian James S. Pula said of the strike, "more than 1,300 workers" went on strike. Additionally, in a December 1912 issue of the International Socialist Review, Phillips Russell stated that, on October 10, "more than 1,500 workers" from both mills performed a walkout. Meanwhile, a 2012 article in the Industrial Worker stated that 1,000 workers from each mill (2,000 total) went on strike. However, a 1913 report by the New York State Department of Labor contradicts some of these larger estimates. The report states that, at the time of the strike, the Phoenix Mill employed 1,100 workers and the Gilbert Mill, 495. While the report does not state the total number of strikers, it does state that about 800 workers were idled as a result of the strike and that the IWW local union, established during the strike, had a membership of about 400.) Around two-thirds of the strikers were women. However, throughout the strike, many skilled workers and native-born Americans resisted in joining. This was partially due to the fact that, in the past, the mill owners had hired immigrant workers to act as strikebreakers during labor disputes, such as in one that had occurred just two years prior. On October 17, Schloss, who had been involved in organized labor and socialist causes during her career prior to Little Falls while working as a nurse in New York City's Lower East Side, resigned from her position as nurse and became a fervent supporter of the strikers, helping to organize and lead many parades and rallies and opening a soup kitchen to feed the strikers.

=== Socialist activists arrive in Little Falls ===
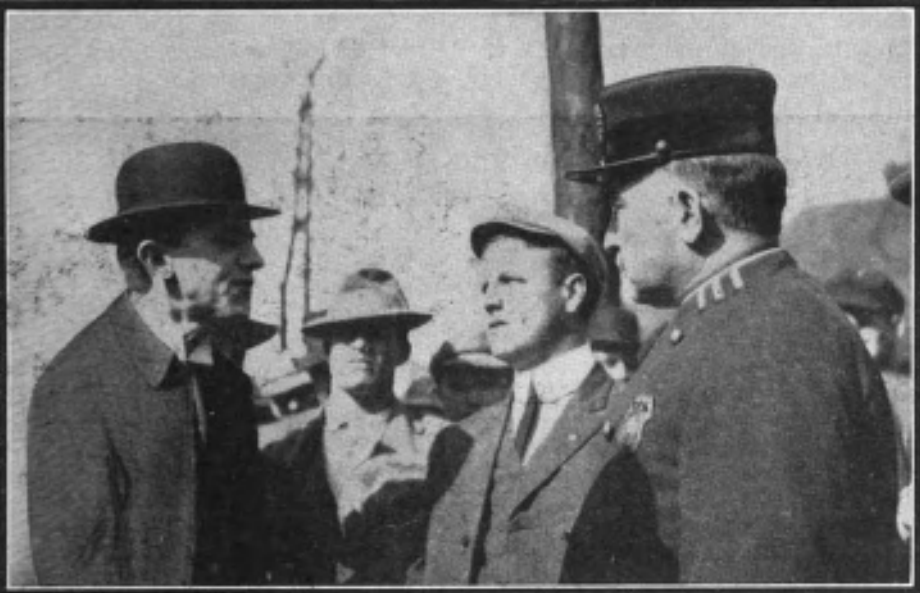
Schenectady Mayor George R. Lunn (left) with Little Falls Police Chief James Long (right) moments before his arrest

Soon after the strike began, organized labor advocates and socialists from the surrounding area began to come to Little Falls to help the strikers. In Schenectady, located about 55 miles (89 km) down the Mohawk River from Little Falls, Mayor George R. Lunn, a member of the Socialist Party of America, recruited many to come with him to Little Falls to help organize the strikers and recruit more textile workers to join in picketing. While Mayor Lunn wished to hold a rally at Clinton Park (an area located directly across the street from the Phoenix Mill), city authorities took advantage of local ordinances to bar the socialists from holding the meeting, with one ordinance requiring permits from city officials to hold a rally and another forbidding gatherings of over 20 people in public. These ordinances were often enforced inconsistently, as previous political rallies by Democratic politicians William Sulzer and Martin H. Glynn had been allowed, but were invoked to prevent socialists who attempted to speak at the park. Local law enforcement officials were highly sympathetic to the mill owners, and both Herkimer County Sheriff James W. Moon and Little Falls Police Chief James "Dusty" Long stated that speeches by the socialists could possibly provoke a riot and further civil unrest. Many activists who attempted to speak in favor of the strike were arrested on charges of disturbing the peace or blocking traffic, including Mayor Lunn himself on October 15. Lunn refused to pay a $50 fine and was sentenced to a 50-day jail sentence. Regarding the strike and involvement of the socialists, Police Chief Long stated, "We have a strike on our hands and a foreign element to deal with. We have in the past kept them in subjugation and we mean to continue to hold them where they belong". In addition to law enforcement, local media institutions were also critical of the strike, with the Little Falls Journal and Courier expressing disapproval of the workers' decision to strike, saying, "The question of whether the wages paid were starvation or not, did not, and cannot enter into the merits of the case. The employer fixed the wages that he was willing to pay, and the men were at liberty to accept the employment or not. ... There were no extraordinary conditions, no disturbances, no suffering, no distress, so far as anyone here knew".

Organizers from Schenectady continued to push for the ability to hold rallies and employed strategies such as overcrowding the local jail and clogging the court system. Mayor Lunn called for 5,000 protestors to come to Little Falls, and following this, hundreds of labor activists, Wobblies, and socialists came to the city to aid the strikers. The action worked, as city officials began releasing many protestors on bail due to the small size of the city jail. Multiple newspapers in the area, such as The Post-Standard in Syracuse, criticized the double standard of preventing socialists from exercising their freedom of speech while allowing other groups, and in a letter to Little Falls Mayor Frank Shall and Sheriff Moon, Governor Dix cautioned them about suppressing New Yorkers' rights, saying:

"Your attention is invited to the fact that the Constitution of the State of New York guarantees the right of free speech and the right of people peacefully to assemble and discuss public questions. The people of the State of New York wish to see that these rights are not unnecessarily curtailed, but are respected in spirit as well as in letter, within your jurisdiction."

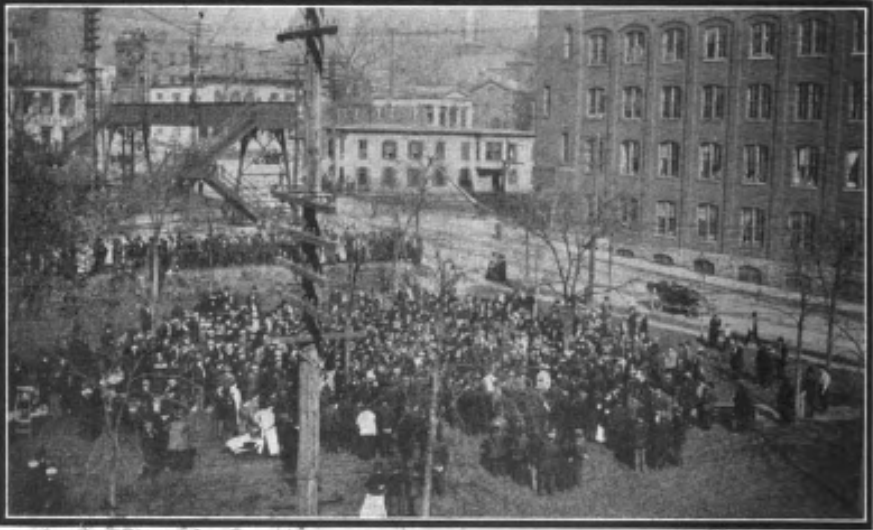
Free speech meeting held by socialists at Clinton Park, with the Phoenix Mill on the right

Facing this pressure, on October 21, Socialist candidates in the 1912 New York state election helped organize a pro-strike rally at Clinton Park that ran without interference from law enforcement. During the speech, Mayor Lunn told the strikers, "Let your enemies use violence if they will—which I hope will never be the case—but do not ever use violence yourselves. You have right on your side. You can unite as one mighty army of workers and thus secure the wages to enable you to live peaceably".

=== The IWW becomes involved ===
Following the free speech protests, IWW officials began to take the lead in organizing the strike activities. Wobblies had been involved since the early days of the strike, with organizers Fillippo Bochino of Rochester and Fred Hirsh of Schenectady arriving in Little Falls shortly after the initial walkouts. Other prominent IWW organizers who came to Little Falls included Benjamin Legere and George Lehney. Following the advice of the IWW, the strikers formed a strike committee that included representatives from both plants and from each nationality of the strikers. The strike committee organized subcommittees to handle other aspects of the strike, such as finances, and organized daily parades and picketing. Legere, who had spent the past few months working for the defense of Joseph James Ettor and Arturo Giovannitti in a court case related to their actions in the Lawrence strike, was the primary organizer, teaching the strikers different picketing techniques and helping to assemble the subcommittees. Additionally, the committee formulated some demands that they submitted to the mill owners on October 23:

1. "Same weekly wages for 54 hours' work as had been received for 60 hours.
2. Additional increase of 10 per cent for all workers on day shift.
3. Additional increase of 15 per cent for all workers on night shift.
4. No discrimination against workers for activity in strike."

On October 24, the strikers held a meeting where they voted to officially unionize with the IWW, with IWW General Secretary Vincent Saint John giving them a charter as Local No. 801 — the National Industrial Union of Textile Workers of Little Falls. On October 27, the strikers held a parade through Little Falls that involved over 1,000 people.

=== Confrontation between police and strikers ===
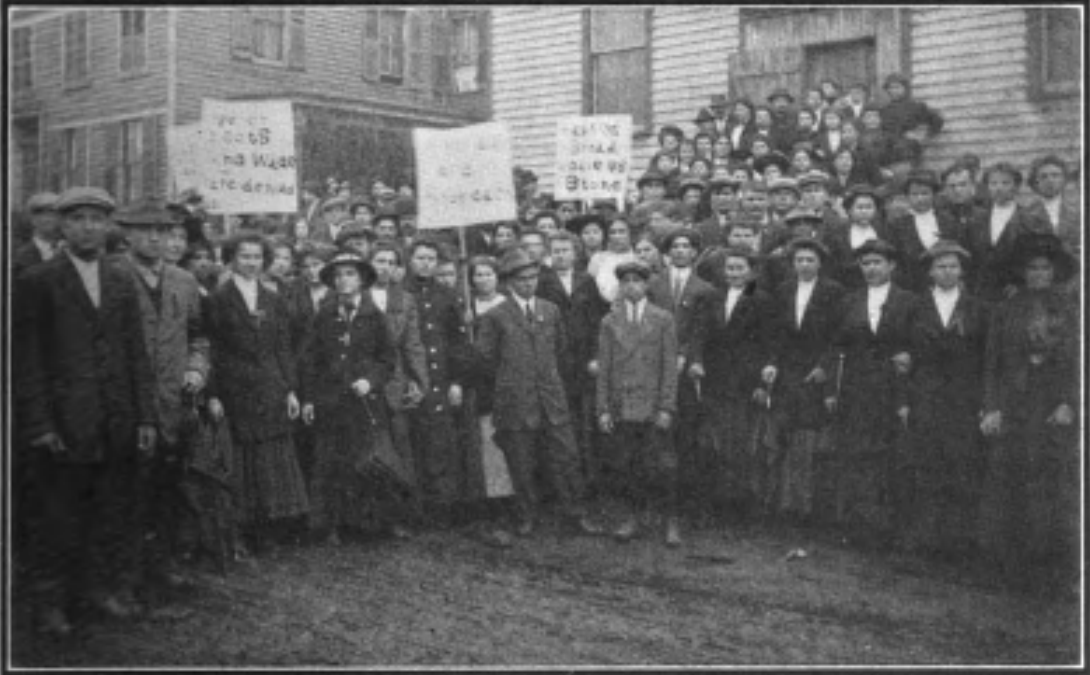
Strikers outside Slovak Hall following the raid, with Matilda Rabinowitz in the front row, fourth from the left

On October 30, a violent confrontation occurred between picketers and law enforcement officials. That morning, Chief Long had several men stationed near the entrance of the Phoenix Mill, where strikers were picketing. Tensions rose as the picketers refused to clear away to allow workers to enter the mill. As a result, a physical confrontation unfolded between the strikers and the officers. (Note: Sources vary on the exact cause of the confrontation. In a report given by Chief Long to investigators from the New York State Department of Labor in December 1912, he stated that the strikers had initiated the violence after charging his officers. However, according to a contemporary report in the International Socialist Review, the instigating action that led to violence was when "Chief Long prodded a young girl in the breasts with his club". Historian Philip S. Foner, in a 1979 book, stated that the confrontation was instigated by a policeman who beat a female striker.) Mounted police officers began to attack strikers with their clubs, with several beaten unconscious. The strikers by comparison were almost all unarmed. During the resulting riot, one officer was shot, while a private police officer from the Humphrey Detective Agency of Albany was stabbed. Shortly after this, the strike committee met with strikers at the Slovak Hall, a building located across the Mohawk River from the mills in the immigrant part of town that was used as the headquarters for the strike. Police chased picketers across the river and to the hall, where they beat the doors down and assaulted the building and its occupants. Cases of liquor and beer were confiscated by the police, who also destroyed musical instruments and the framed IWW charter that the union had displayed in the hall. Many people who resisted were beaten, and the police arrested the entire strike committee, as well as several other strikers and sympathizers, including Schloss. Legere had managed to escape arrest and went to Utica, where he sent off several letters before he returned to Little Falls the following day and was promptly arrested. The night after the raid, strikers gathered at the hall and cleaned it before singing "La Marseillaise" and "The Internationale".

Following the attack, the IWW sent more organizers to help with the strike effort, including Bill Haywood, Matilda Rabinowitz, and several people from Schenectady to help with relief efforts. Following the arrests, Rabinowitz helped to reorganize the strike committee with new members, while Mayor Lunn and other socialists from Schenectady operated the soup kitchen. Rabinowitz would serve as the IWW's primary organizer for the remainder of the strike, as Haywood was suffering from diabetes-related illness. Additionally, the IWW brought attorney Jessie Ashley to Little Falls to help prepare for the legal matters that those arrested would be facing. The following day, the strikers published a handbill condemning the action as a police riot, stating, "It was the most brutal, cold blooded act ever done in these parts. Nothing under heaven can ever justify it, and the soul of the degenerate brute who started it will shrivel in hell long, long before the workers will ever forget this day". In response, members of Little Falls' clergy, politicians, and businessmen held a town meeting where they voiced their approval of the actions taken by the police. By November 16, the strike had idled about 800 workers who remained at the mills. On November 19, activist Helen Keller sent a letter to the strikers commending them for their determination and expressing her support for their cause and included about $87 to help with the strike fund. (Note: Sources vary on the exact amount she donated, with ranges of between $87 and $87.50.) Keller was an advocate for socialist causes and had joined the IWW after their work in Lawrence earlier that year. Donations were also sent by many supporters of the strike, including the IWW local union in Columbus, Ohio, which raised $40 for the strike. During this time, Rabinowitz and Schloss traveled throughout the Northeastern United States to gather additional support for the strike.

=== Mediation and the United Textile Workers ===
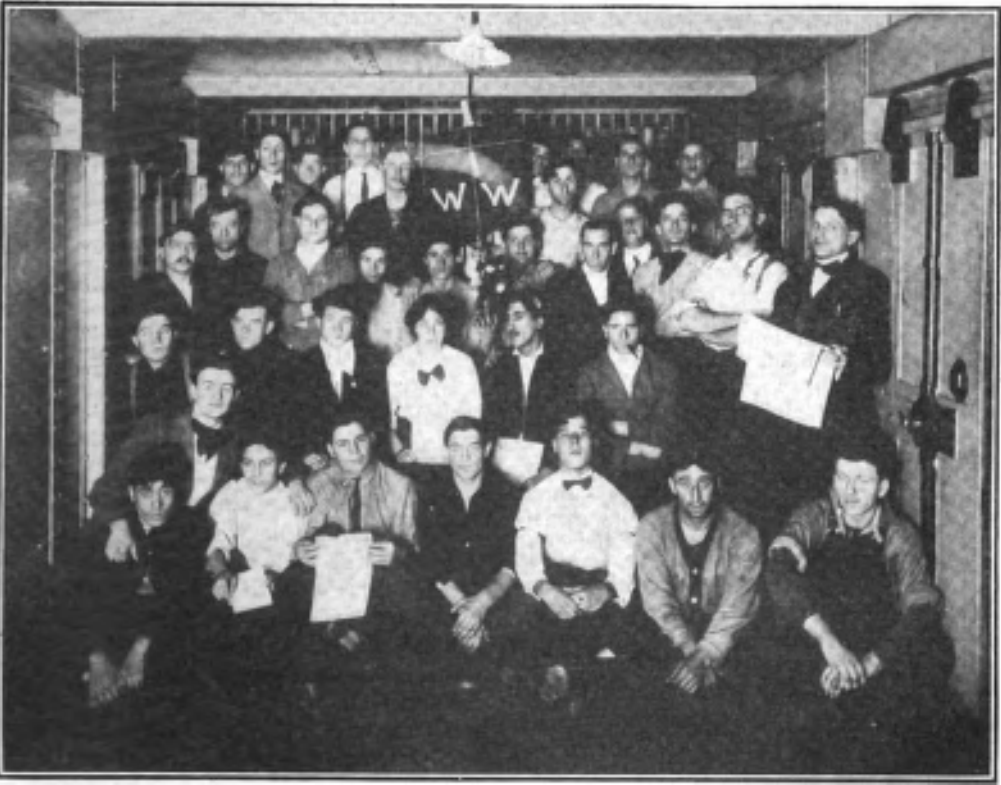
IWW members in jail in Little Falls

Almost as soon as the strike began, the New York State Department of Labor's Bureau of Mediation and Arbitration arrive in Little Falls to attempt to broker an agreement between the strikers and the mills. Before the strike had spread to the Gilbert Mill, the bureau interviewed the owner of the Phoenix Mill, who said he would not negotiate any change in pay with the strikers until they returned to work. Meanwhile, after the strike had spread to the Gilbert Mill, representatives of that enterprise agreed to meet with strikers, but refused to have an IWW interpreter present, causing the negotiations to falter. For several weeks thereafter, neither mill would agree to negotiate in any way with IWW representatives. Around this time, the United Textile Workers of America (UTW), an AFL-affiliated union, began to organize some of the strikers into their union and negotiated with the mills on their behalf. The UTW presence in Little Falls, led by AFL organizer Charles A. Miles of Auburn, had arrived after the IWW had established its role in the strike and began to directly compete with the IWW to control the strike. According to reporting from the International Socialist Review, which was sympathetic to the IWW over the UTW, some members of the private police that had been involved in the October 30 confrontation had been members of the UTW. Miles partnered with business interests, clergy members, and law enforcement to portray the IWW as a violent anarchist group that was not able to effectively negotiate on the behalf of their members. Miles and the UTW succeeded in recruiting some strikers to the organization, claiming an initial membership of 52 mill workers, and while the mill owners refused to negotiate with the IWW, Miles managed to negotiate a settlement for his group with the millworkers, announcing an end to the strike on December 2. The settlement included an increase in day wages and piece work pay to make up for the loss of hours. However, the IWW local at this time claimed a membership of 400 workers who remained on strike. Concerning the competition between the two unions during the strike, historian James S. Pula has said, "In the end, the IWW proved more influential, possibly because of the egregious actions of local officials that called forth a stronger response from the workers".

=== Later strike action ===
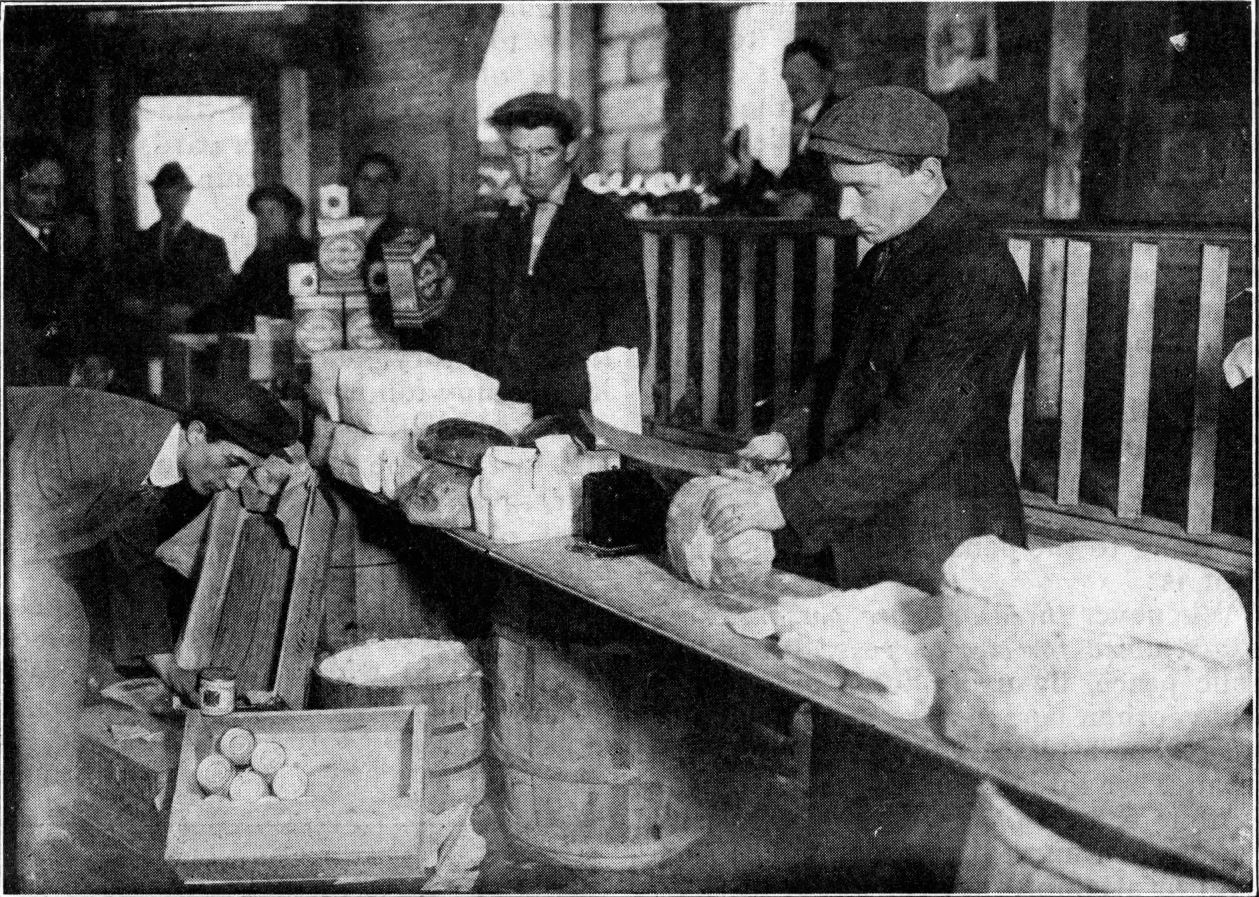
Soup kitchen operated by the Industrial Workers of the World during the strike

On December 17, in a move similar to what the IWW had done in Lawrence, the strikers began to send their children to temporarily live in the homes of strike sympathizers in cities such as Amsterdam, Schenectady, and Pittsfield, Massachusetts, with 18 of a planned 50 leaving that day. Strikers were harassed by law enforcement officials during an accompanying march held to the train station, garnering significant media attention and public sympathy for the strike. On December 24, due to the protractedness of the strike, the State Department of Labor ordered an official inquiry into the causes and nature of the strike. The department held hearings in the city on December 27, 28, and 30, in total interviewing 47 witnesses, including numerous strikers and the mill owners. The investigators determined conclusively that the decrease in wages was the primary cause of and continued reason for the strike, though mill owners also contended that the intervention of the IWW had prolonged the strike. Following the hearings, the investigators created a multi-point plan that they submitted to the mill owners, who agreed to it. The terms, as written by the investigators, stated:

1. "There will be no discrimination against individual strikers.
2. The companies to reinstate all former employees as soon as possible.
3. All men and women working 54 hours to receive pay formerly received for 60 hours.
4. Piece work rates to be adjusted to compensate for reduction of time caused by fifty-four hour law.
5. Night lunch to be adjusted by the workers directly involved.
6. Winding schedules: Cop yarn in most sizes is raised 5 cents per 100 pounds. Mule spun yarn is increased from 9 per cent on the largest size to 16 per cent on the smallest size. 10 per cent additional is paid on latch needle knitting. Other piece work prices affected by the fifty-four hour law to be adjusted on the same plan."

On January 2, Rabinowitz called a mass meeting of the strikers where the terms of the proposal were read with the help of interpreters, including Carlo Tresca. The state mediator was also present to answer questions or provide clarifications for the strikers. Also during the meeting, attorney Fred Moore spoke to the crowd, calling on them to continue to fight for better conditions if they approved of the proposal. Ultimately, the strikers unanimously agreed to accept the terms of the contract, with the meeting ending with a playing of "La Marseillaise". The strikers agreed to return to work that Monday, January 6, thus ending the strike. (Note: January 6 is the date given by the New York State Department of Labor as the end of the strike. Other sources give conflicting dates of January 3 and January 4.) The IWW viewed the settlement as a success.

== Aftermath ==
Concerning the strike, Pula stated in a 1995 book that the "dispute [was] characterized by physical and emotional bitterness that more than matched the inclement weather of a brutal winter". The strike was the longest to occur as a result of the Jackson bill, and the employees involved lost a cumulative 68,379 work days. It was the largest strike led by the IWW in the state of New York and represented one of several instances during this time of cooperation on the local level between Wobblies and members of the Socialist Party, despite disputes among higher-ups in both organizations. It was one of many in a wave of strikes in the northeastern United States that followed the Lawrence strike, with other textile labor disputes occurring around the same time in New Bedford, Massachusetts, and Passaic, New Jersey, as well as part of a wave of labor disputes led by the IWW in the northeast and Midwest. As a result of the strike, mill workers saw wage increases of between 6 and 15 percent, and the state government launched an investigation into the state of living conditions among the immigrant laborers in Little Falls. Additionally, the city government launched a "clean-up week" in an attempt to improve living conditions in the immigrant part of town, the Phoenix Mill constructed a few new houses for workers, and a loan company was established to aid immigrants.

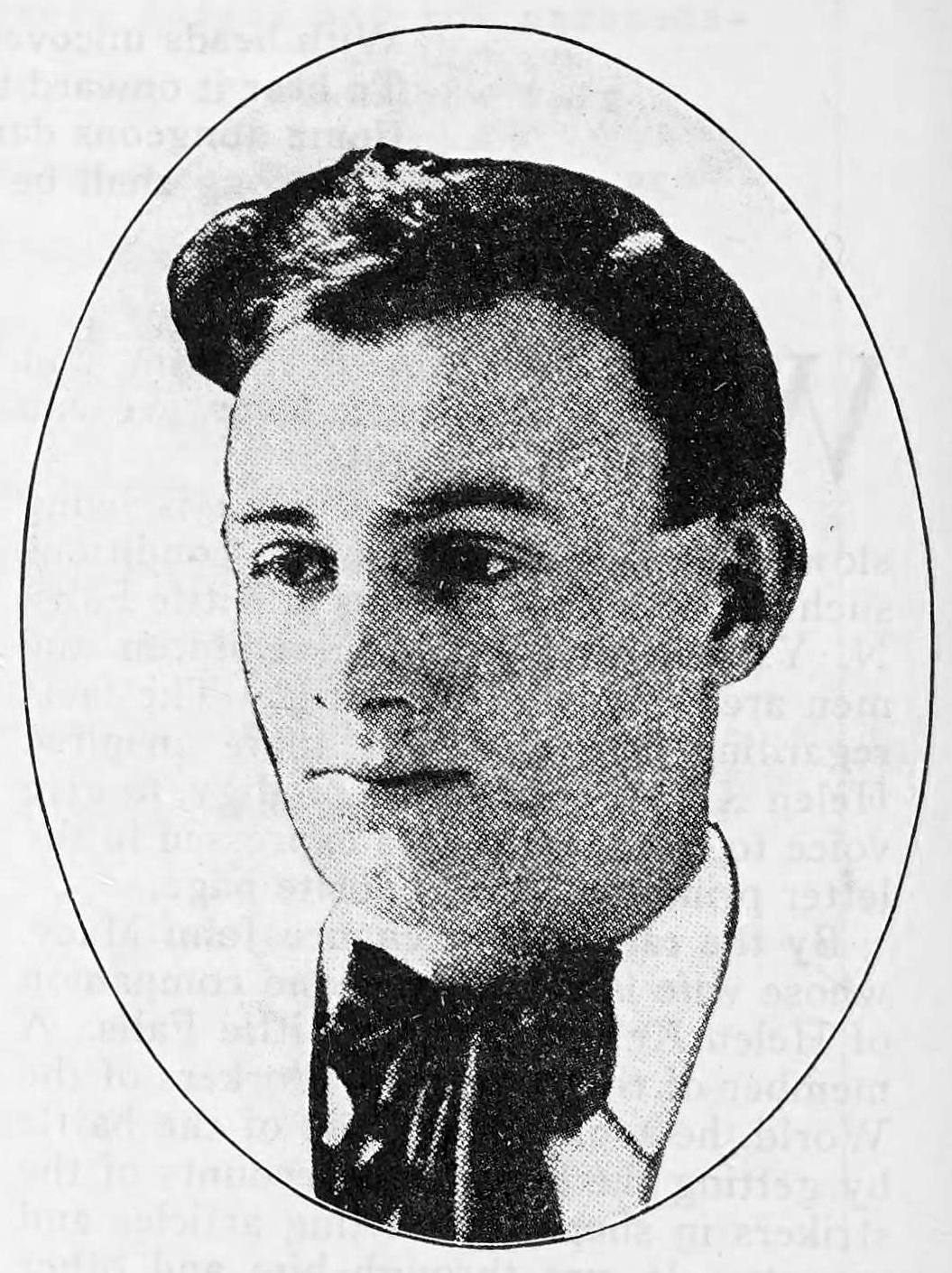
IWW organizer Benjamin Legere was found guilty of assault during the strike and sentenced to one year at Auburn Prison.

Following the strike, the IWW focused on the legal issues concerning 14 strikers who remained arrested. Moore served as the attorney for those involved, with trials taking place from March to May 1913. In the end, many were found not guilty or received fines, but Bochino and Legere were found guilty of assault. The two Wobblies were sentenced to a year in Auburn Prison, where they were interred until July 1914. According to historian Robert E. Snyder in a 1979 article in the journal New York History, the court cases drained money and resources from the local union, and with two of the union's organizers in prison, the local struggled and eventually fell into a state of disorder. This time period also coincided with the IWW's 1913 Paterson silk strike, which ended in disaster for the union. According to historian Philip S. Foner, after the Paterson strike, "the bright hopes of the IWW in the textile industry lay shattered", further stating, "The IWW suffered a setback in Paterson from which it never completely recovered. Its prestige in the East, which had been at a high point following the victory at Lawrence, underwent a tremendous decline, and there was no longer talk about the IWW's infallibility in strikes". Coming as it did between the Lawrence and Paterson strike, Snyder states that the Little Falls strike "has been neglected by labor historians".

Following the IWW's decline, the more conservative AFL remained and recruited workers in the area, and over the next few years the labor organization recruited heavily from immigrant laborers in the region. The AFL and IWW would continue to compete to recruit workers for the next several years, such as in the Bayonne refinery strikes of 1915–1916, which also involved many Polish immigrants. However, by the 1920s, the IWW had declined significantly in size and power. Unionization amongst Polish immigrants in the northeast continued to increase over the next several years and is highlighted by a number of strikes, such as a 1916 labor dispute with the New York Mills Corporation in New York Mills. Later labor disputes in Herkimer County include the Remington Rand strike of 1936–1937 and several disputes led by dairy farmers in the 1930s.

The city of Little Falls held events to commemorate the centennial of the strike in 2012. Events were also held elsewhere in the Mohawk Valley: in Ilion, home to Remington Rand, a dramatic play based on the strike was performed, and in Utica the Unitarian Universalist church had a Wobbly give a speech about the strike on Labor Day.

== Sources ==
- Abrams, Irving S. (1989). Roediger, Dave; Boanes, Phyllis (eds.). Haymarket Heritage: The Memoirs of Irving S. Abrams. Illinois Labor History Society; With an introduction from Joseph M. Jacobs. Chicago: Charles H. Kerr Publishing Company.
- Biscay, J. S. (April 1913a). Kerr, Charles H. (ed.). "Liberty or the Penitentiary?" (PDF). International Socialist Review. XIII (10). Chicago: Charles H. Kerr & Co.: 750–754 – via Marxists Internet Archive.
- Biscay, J. S. (May 1913b). Kerr, Charles H. (ed.). "Two Jurors Disappeared" (PDF). International Socialist Review. XIII (11). Chicago: Charles H. Kerr & Co.: 822 – via Marxists Internet Archive.
- Cashman, John (2005). "Industrial Workers of the World". In Eisenstadt, Peter; Moss, Laura-Eve (eds.). The Encyclopedia of New York State. Foreword by Carole F. Huxley. Syracuse, New York: Syracuse University Press. p. 773. ISBN 978-0-8156-0808-0.
- DiCocco, Beth (November 3, 2012). "Review: 'Strike Story' both entertains and educates audience". Observer-Dispatch.
- Dunn, Brendan Maslauskas (November 2012). "In November We Remember: The Centennial of the 1912 Little Falls Textile Strike". Industrial Worker. 109 (9). Industrial Workers of the World. Archived from the original on November 29, 2022 – via libcom.org.
- Eliassen, Meredith (2021). Helen Keller: A Life in American History. Women Making History. Santa Barbara, California: ABC-Clio. ISBN 978-1-4408-7464-2.
- "City preparing to commemorate 100th anniversary of textile strike". The Evening Times. Little Falls, New York. June 26, 2012a.
- "1912 Textile Strike Commemoration Continues". The Evening Times. Little Falls, New York. September 27, 2012b.
- Foner, Philip S. (1979). "Little Falls, Paterson, and Other Struggles". Women and the American Labor Movement: From Colonial Times to the Eve of World War I. New York City: Free Press. pp. 440–458. ISBN 978-0-02-910370-8.
- Fones-Wolf, Elizabeth; Fones-Wolf, Kenneth (1983). "Trade-Union Evangelism: Religion and the AFL in the Labor Forward Movement, 1912–16". In Frisch, Michael H.; Walkowitz, Daniel J. (eds.). Working-Class America: Essays on Labor, Community, and American Society (Illini Books ed.). Urbana, Illinois: University of Illinois Press. pp. 153–184. ISBN 978-0-252-00954-9.
- Goldberg, David J. (2009). "Twentieth-Century Textile Strikes". In Brenner, Aaron; Day, Benjamin; Ness, Immanuel (eds.). The Encyclopedia of Strikes in American History. Armonk, New York: M. E. Sharpe. pp. 330–341. ISBN 978-0-7656-1330-1.
- Golin, Steve (1988). The Fragile Bridge: Paterson Silk Strike, 1913. Philadelphia: Temple University Press. ISBN 978-1-56639-005-7.
- Haywood, William D. (January 1913). Kerr, Charles H. (ed.). "On the Picket Line at Little Falls, New York" (PDF). International Socialist Review. XIII (7). Chicago: Charles H. Kerr & Co.: 519–523 – via Marxists Internet Archive.
- Kerr, Charles H., ed. (February 1913a). "A Red Brigade" (PDF). International Socialist Review. XIII (8). Chicago: Charles H. Kerr & Co.: 599–600 – via Marxists Internet Archive.
- Kerr, Charles H., ed. (March 1913b). "Will Prosecute Mill Owners" (PDF). International Socialist Review. XIII (9). Chicago: Charles H. Kerr & Co.: 670 – via Marxists Internet Archive.
- Kerr, Charles H., ed. (July 1913c). "Legere Sentenced to One Year" (PDF). International Socialist Review. XIV (1). Chicago: Charles H. Kerr & Co.: 41 – via Marxists Internet Archive.
- Nelson, Daniel (1996). Managers and Workers: Origins of the Twentieth-Century Factory System in the United States, 1880–1920 (2nd ed.). Madison, Wisconsin: University of Wisconsin Press. ISBN 978-0-299-14883-6.
- Orth, Samuel P. (1919). Johnson, Allen (ed.). The Armies of Labor: A Chronicle of the Organized Wage-Earners. The Chronicles of America (Textbook ed.). New Haven, Connecticut: Yale University Press.
- Pearson, Chad (2005). "Labor". In Eisenstadt, Peter; Moss, Laura-Eve (eds.). The Encyclopedia of New York State. Foreword by Carole F. Huxley. Syracuse, New York: Syracuse University Press. pp. 848–852. ISBN 978-0-8156-0808-0.
- Perkins, Susan R. (2005). "Herkimer County". In Eisenstadt, Peter; Moss, Laura-Eve (eds.). The Encyclopedia of New York State. Foreword by Carole F. Huxley. Syracuse, New York: Syracuse University Press. pp. 709–712. ISBN 978-0-8156-0808-0.
- Pula, James S. (1995). Polish Americans: An Ethnic Community. New York City: Twayne Publishers. ISBN 978-0-8057-8427-5.
- Pula, James S. (2009). "Polish Workers and Strikes, 1900–1937". In Brenner, Aaron; Day, Benjamin; Ness, Immanuel (eds.). The Encyclopedia of Strikes in American History. Armonk, New York: M. E. Sharpe. pp. 138–153. ISBN 978-0-7656-1330-1.
- Rogers, William C.; Downey, P. J.; McManus, James (March 1913). "The Little Falls Textile Workers' Dispute". State of New York Department of Labor Bulletin. XV (54): 27–31.
- Russell, Phillips (December 1912). Kerr, Charles H. (ed.). "The Strike at Little Falls" (PDF). International Socialist Review. XIII (6). Chicago: Charles H. Kerr & Co.: 455–460 – via Marxists Internet Archive.
- Russell, Phillips (February 1913). Kerr, Charles H. (ed.). "The Fourteen in Jail" (PDF). International Socialist Review. XIII (8). Chicago: Charles H. Kerr & Co.: 598–599 – via Marxists Internet Archive.
- Shippee, Lester Burrell (1924). Recent American History. New York City: Macmillan Company. OCLC 315984.
- Snyder, Robert E. (January 1979). "Women, Wobblies, and Workers' Rights: The 1912 Textile Strike in Little Falls, New York". New York History. 60 (1). Cornell University Press: 29–57. ISSN 0146-437X. JSTOR 23169970.
