= Popular front =

Coalition of different political groupings

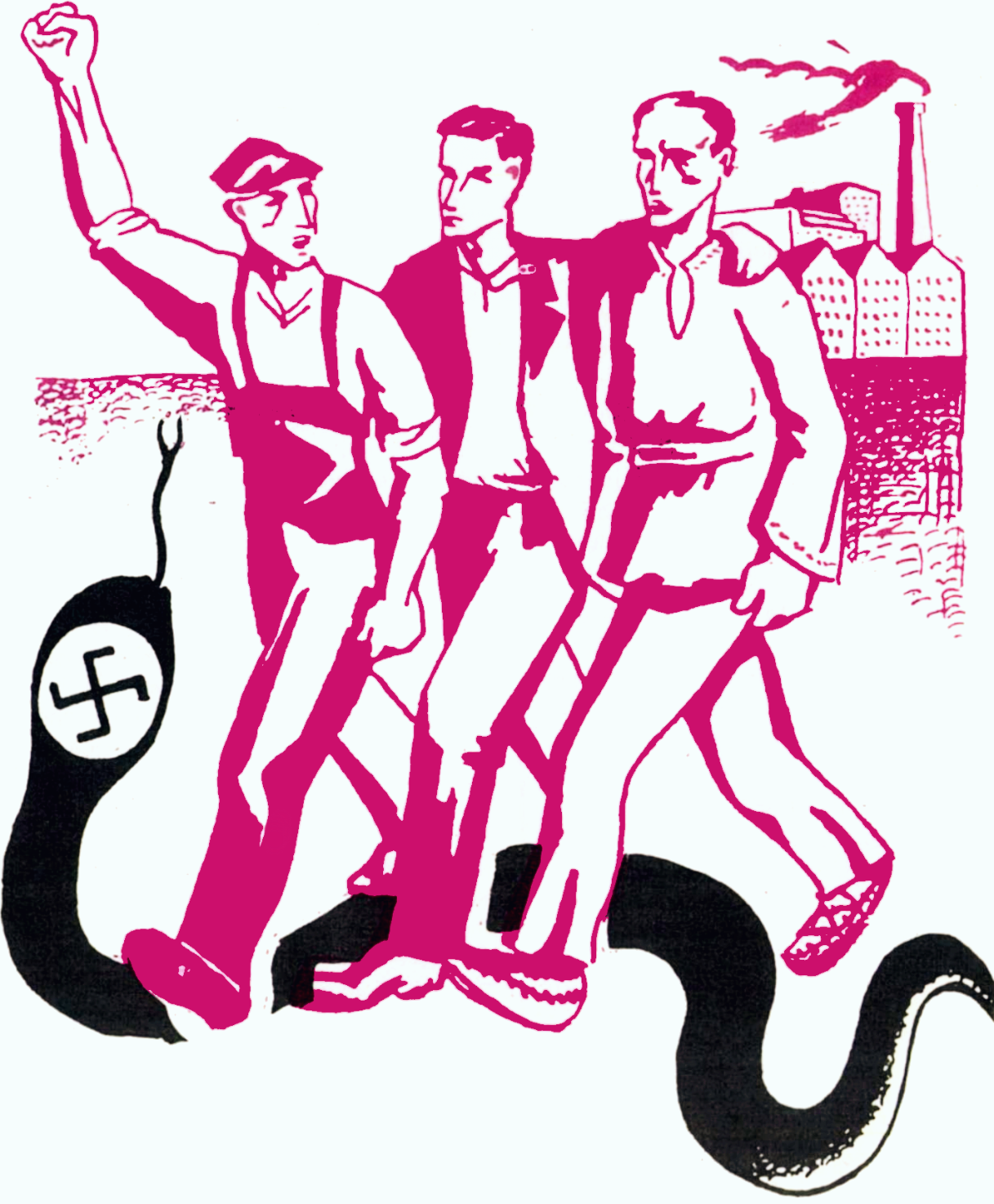
A popular front cartoon showing a worker, intellectual and peasant trampling on a swastika-bearing snake in the Romanian leftist and anti-fascist newspaper Cuvântul Liber, 1935

A popular front is any coalition of working-class and/or middle-class entities, including liberal and social democratic ones, united for a purpose. Generally, it is "a coalition especially of leftist political parties against a common opponent". The phrase uses "front" in the sense of a political movement "linking divergent elements to achieve common objectives".

The term was first used in the mid-1930s in Europe by communists concerned over the rapid growth of fascist movements in Italy and Germany, which they sought to combat by coalescing with non-communist political groupings they had previously attacked as enemies. Temporarily successful popular front governments were formed in France, Spain, and Chile in 1936.

The name has also been used by other alliances such as the Popular Front of India. In the late years of the Soviet Union, the popular fronts created actually played a key role in ending Communist Party rule in the Soviet republics.

== Terminology and similar groups ==
The term "popular front" has been summarized by historian Kermit McKenzie as:

...An imaginative, flexible program of strategy and tactics, in which communists were permitted to exploit the symbols of patriotism, to assume the role of defenders of national independence, to attack fascism without demanding an end to capitalism as the only remedy, and, most important, to enter upon alliances with other parties, on the basis of fronts or on the basis of a government in which communists might participate.

McKenzie characterized this as a mere tactical expedient, without changing the ultimate goal of overthrowing capitalism through revolution.

When communist parties came to power after World War II in the People's Republic of China, and the countries of Central, and Eastern Europe, it was common to do so at the head of a "front" (such as the United Front and Chinese People's Political Consultative Conference in China, the National Front in Czechoslovakia, the Front of National Unity in Poland, the Democratic Bloc in East Germany, etc.) containing several ostensibly-noncommunist parties. While it was the communist party—not the fronts—that held power in these countries, the alleged coalitions allowed the Party to deny that it had a monopoly on power.

A related term was "communist front", meaning an organizational facade used to mask the true character of "the actual controlling agent", the Soviet Communist Party, with no real influence by others. The strategy of creating or taking over organizations that would then claim to be expressions of popular will, not merely organs of the Communist Party, was first proposed by Vladimir Lenin. Rather than political coalitions opposing fascism, these groups sought to spread the Marxist–Leninist message in places where it was either illegal or distrusted by many of the people the party wanted to reach.

Front organizations were used from the 1920s through the 1950s, and proliferated during the popular front political coalitions of the 1930s. Eventually there were large numbers of front organizations, such as the World Federation of Democratic Youth, International Union of Students, World Federation of Trade Unions, Women's International Democratic Federation, and the World Peace Council. Anti-communists during the Cold War frequently accused liberal political organizations of being Communist fronts.

== Comintern policy: 1934–1939 ==
The Communist International (Comintern), the international organization created by the Soviet Communist Party in the wake of the 1917 Bolshevik Revolution, went through a number of ideological strategies to advance proletarian revolution. Its 1922 congress called for a "United Front" (the "Second Period") after it became clear that proletarian revolution would not imminently sweep aside capitalism in the rest of the world: the minority of communist revolutionary workers would join with workers outside the communist parties against the bourgeoisie. This was followed by the "Third Period" starting in mid-1928, which called for militant policies to take advantage of the economic crises of capitalism, with no need for coalitions with non-communists. As the Nazi Party came to power in 1933 in Germany and eliminated the powerful German communist movement, it became clear that fascism was the main enemy, and that opposition to it was disorganized and divided. A new, less extreme policy was needed, whereby Communists would form political coalitions with non-Communist socialists and even democratic non-socialists – "liberals, moderates, and even conservatives" – in "popular fronts" against fascism.

=== Germany ===
Until early 1933, the Communist Party of Germany (KPD) was regarded as the world's most successful communist party in terms of membership and electoral results. As a result, the Communist International, or Comintern, expected national communist parties to base their political style on the German example. That approach, known as the "class against class" strategy, or the "Third Period", expected that the economic crisis and the trauma of war would increasingly radicalise public opinion and that if the communists remained aloof from mainstream democratic politics, they would benefit from the populist disillusionment and be swept to power. Non-communist socialist parties were denounced as "social fascist".

After a series of financial crises in 1926, 1929 and 1931, public opinion in Europe did radicalise, but not to the benefit of left-wing anticapitalist parties. In the weeks that followed Hitler's rise to power in February 1933, the German Communist Party and the Comintern clung rigidly to their view that the Nazi triumph would be brief and that it would be a case of "after Hitler – our turn"; however, as the brutality of the Nazi government became clear and there was no sign of its collapse, communists began to sense a need for an urgent about-face, especially as Adolf Hitler had made it clear that he regarded the Soviet Union as an enemy state.

In several countries over the previous years, a sense had grown within the Communist Parties that the German model of "class against class" was not the best strategy for their national political contexts, and that some alliances were needed to prevent the greater threat of nationalist dictatorships. However, figures such as Henri Barbé and Pierre Célor in France and José Bullejos and Adama in Spain, who advocated greater co-operation with social-democratic parties and possibly even left-wing capitalist parties, were removed from leadership. Previous cooperative organizations, such as in the (later-renamed) World Committee Against War and Imperialism, had not sought genuince co-operation with other parties as equals, but rather to draw potential sympathisers into the Soviet Communist movement, ending in denunciation by the leaders of other left-wing associations.

In 1934, Georgi Dimitrov, who had humiliated the Nazis with his defence against charges of involvement in the Reichstag fire, became the general secretary of the Comintern, and it became more receptive to the coalition approach. Official acceptance of the new policy was first signalled in a Pravda article of May 1934 commenting favourably on socialist-communist collaboration. The reorientation was formalised at the Comintern's Seventh Congress in July 1935 and consummated with the proclamation of a "People's Front Against Fascism and War". Communist parties were now instructed to form broad alliances with all antifascist parties with the aim of securing social advance at home as well as a military alliance with the Soviet Union to isolate the fascist dictatorships. The resulting "popular fronts" succeeded in forming governments in France, Spain, and Chile, but not elsewhere.

=== France ===
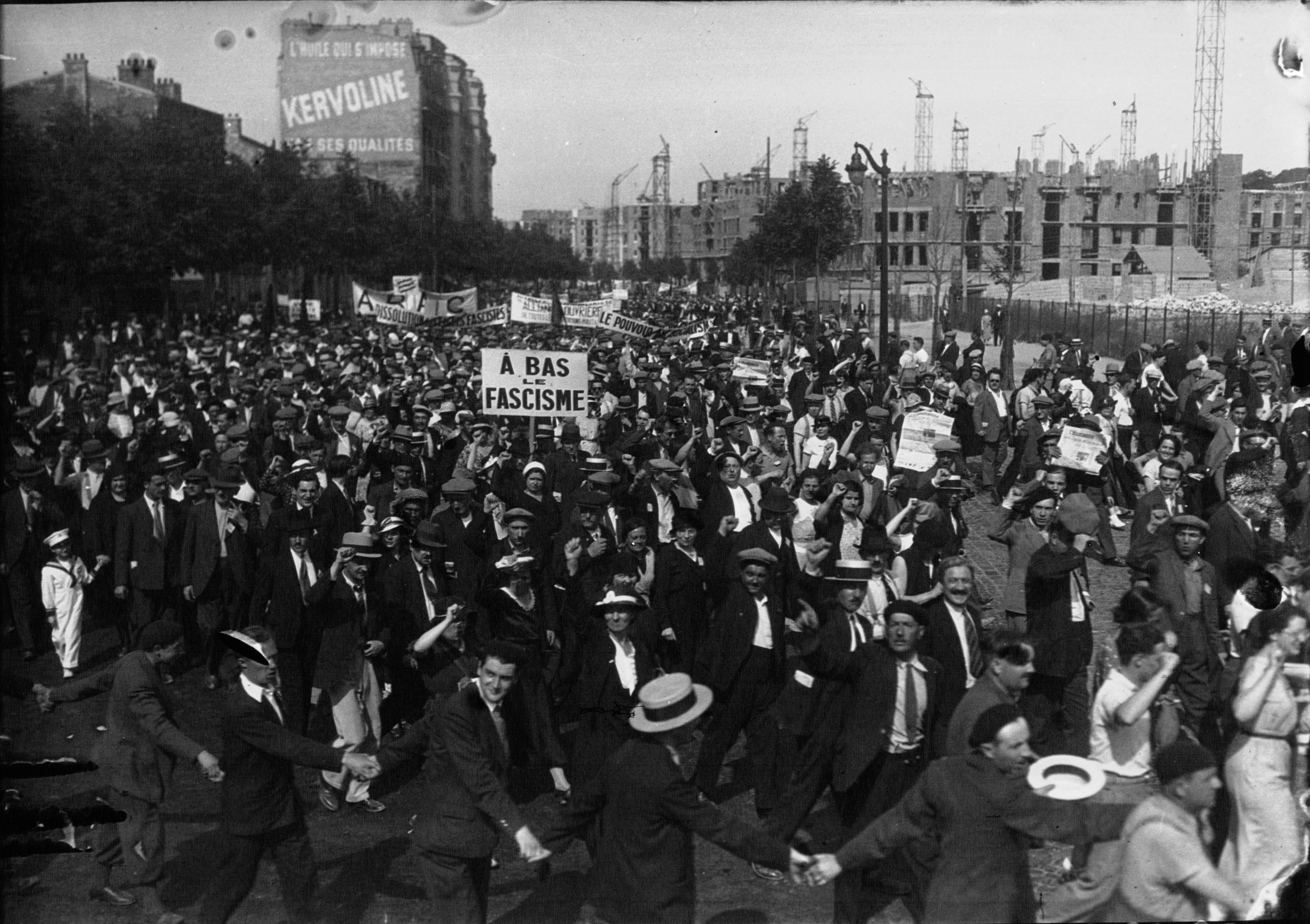
SFIO demonstration in response to the 6 February 1934 crisis. A sign reads "Down with fascism."

French politics saw the collapse of a leftist government coalition of social-democrats and left-liberal republicans, followed by far-right riots which brought to power an autocratic right-wing government. With a slide toward authoritarianism looming, previously peaceful socialists were now more inclined to street protests, and previously doctrinaire communists more willing to co-operate with other antifascists in Parliament. In June 1934, Léon Blum's socialist French Section of the Workers' International (SFIO) signed a pact of united action with the French Communist Party. By October, the Communist Party began to suggest that republican parties opposed to the nationalist government might also be included, and strengthened this the next July after the French government tilted even further to the right.

In May 1935, France and the Soviet Union signed a defensive military alliance, and in August 1935, the 7th World Congress of the Comintern officially endorsed the Popular Front strategy. In the elections of May 1936, the Popular Front won a majority of parliamentary seats (378 deputies against 220), and Blum formed a government. In Fascist Italy, the Comintern advised an alliance between the Italian Communist Party and the Italian Socialist Party, but the latter rejected it.

=== Great Britain ===
In reaction to the National Government's appeasement of Nazi Germany, there were attempts at a popular front between the British Labour Party, the Liberal Party, the Independent Labour Party, the Communist Party and even rebellious elements of the Conservative Party under Winston Churchill. They failed mainly because of opposition from within the Labour Party, which was seething with anger over communist efforts to take over union locals, as well as the general incompatibility between liberal and socialist approaches.

=== United States ===
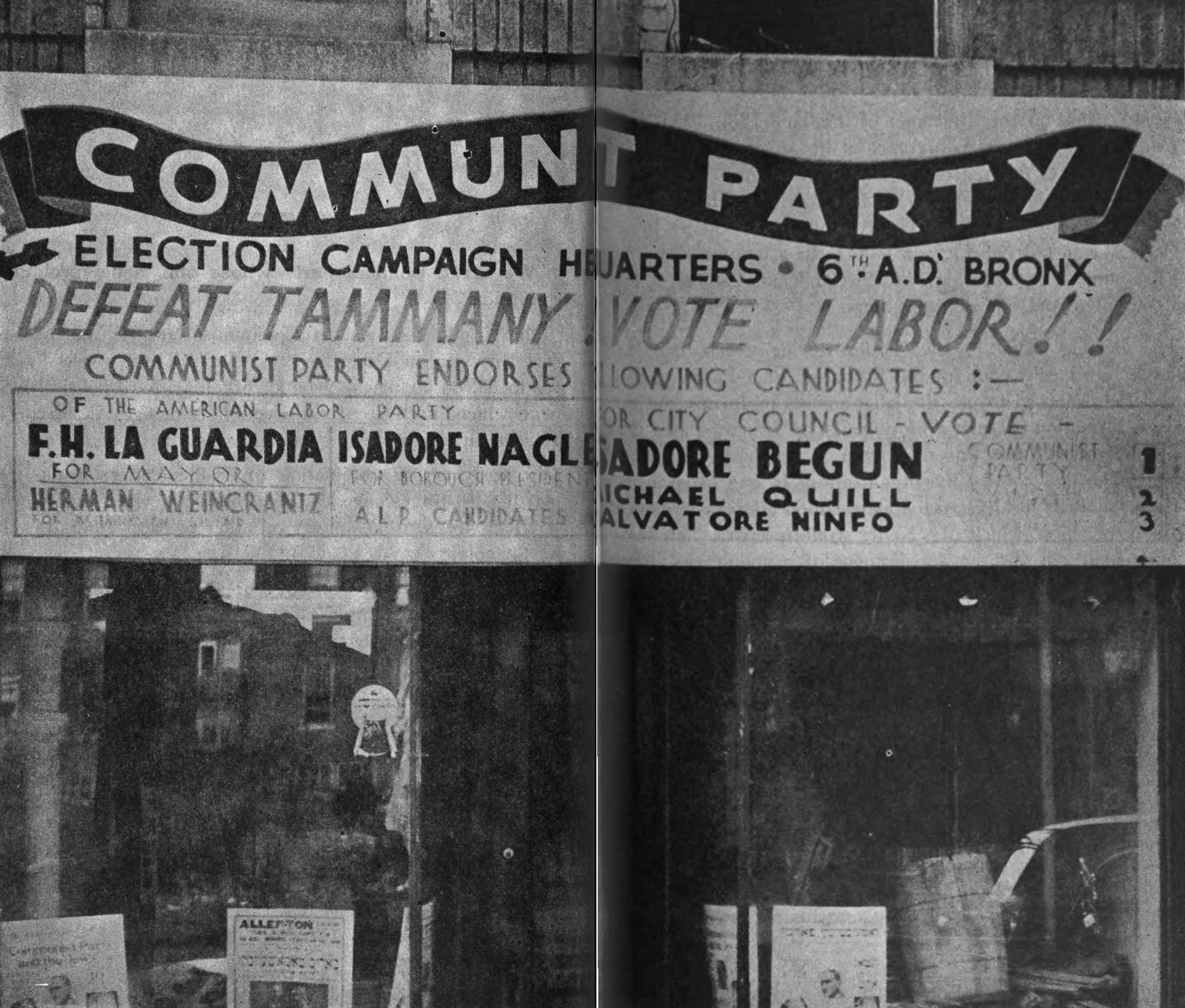
Communist Party campaign headquarters in the Bronx, New York during the 1937 elections, displaying CPUSA candidate Isidore Begun and American Labor Party candidates side by side

The Communist Party of the United States of America (CPUSA) had been quite hostile to the New Deal until 1935, but it suddenly reversed its position. After attempting a joint Socialist-Communist ticket with Norman Thomas's Socialist Party of America in the 1936 presidential election, which the Socialists rejected, the communists also then offered support to Franklin D. Roosevelt's New Deal. The Popular Front saw the Communist Party taking a very patriotic and populist line, later called Browderism.

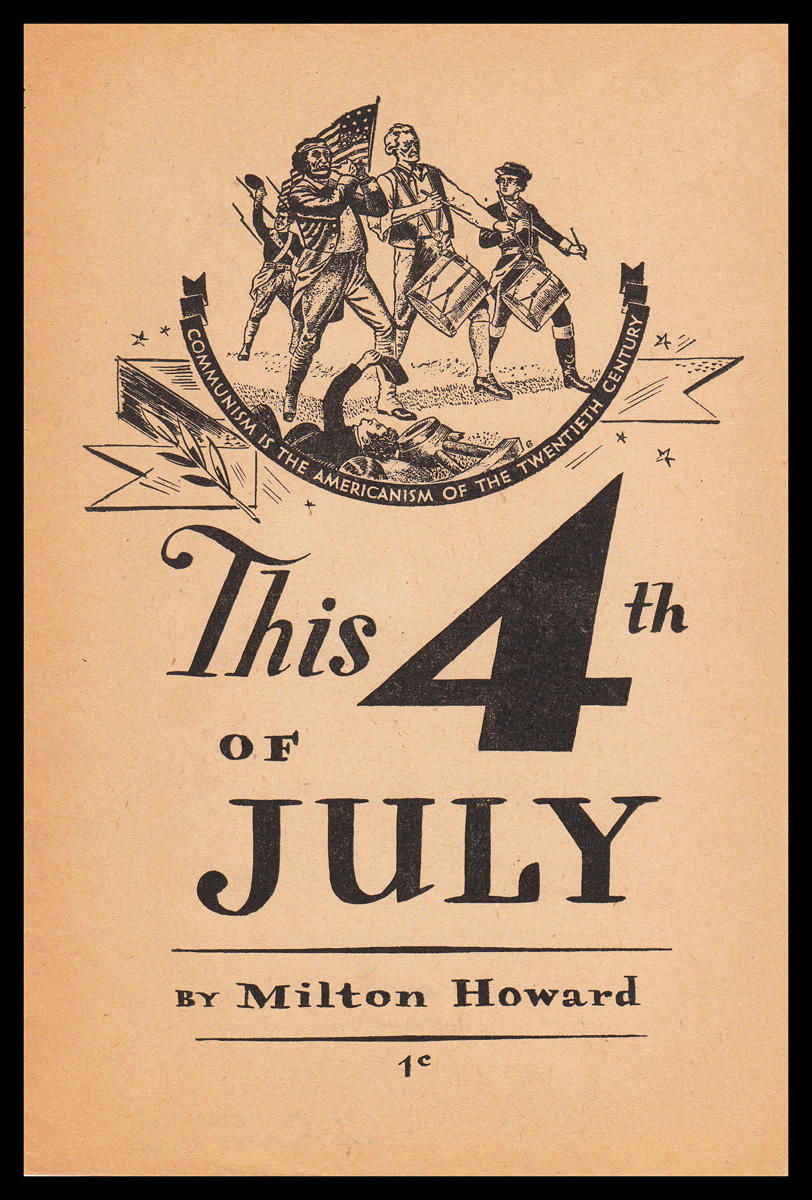
Cover of Milton Howard's This 4th of July (1938), a CPUSA pamphlet from the Popular Front era that used patriotic themes under the slogan "Communism is the Americanism of the 20th Century."

Cultural historian Michael Denning has challenged the Communist Party-centered view of the US popular front, saying that sympathetic non-members (fellow-travelers) composed the majority of the movement. In his view, Communist party membership was not a mandatory or crucial element of leftist US culture at the time.

==== California ====
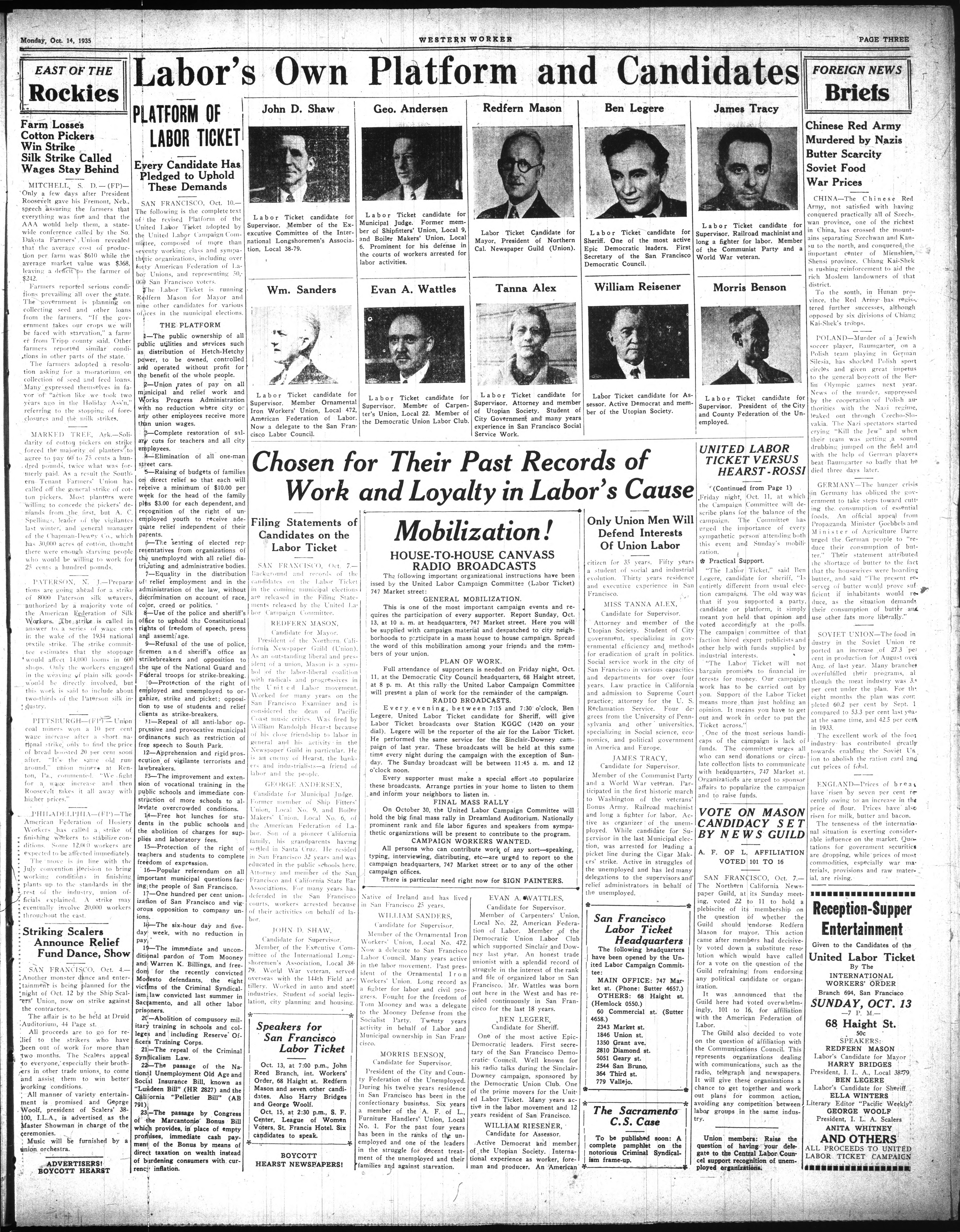
A page from the Western Worker, the west coast organ of the Communist Party USA, featuring the United Labor ticket, October 14, 1935

At a meeting of the American League Against War and Fascism in San Francisco on April 29, 1935, Samuel Adams Darcy, leader of the CPUSA's California district, called for a "United Labor party" composed of "Communists, Socialists, EPIC followers and other Liberals" to oppose anti-labor legislation. Less than a month later, at the annual convention of the End Poverty in California (EPIC) movement, delegate Ben Legere introduced a motion to build a popular front of "EPICs, Socialists, Communists, Laborites, Utopians, Townsendites and Technocrats... to oppose oppressive legislation, war, and fascism." Upton Sinclair, the leader of the movement, expressed his opposition to the plan, and it was voted down.

On July 19, at a conference held at the Building Trades Temple in San Francisco, the United Labor Party was founded. It brought together 37 organizations, including the Communist Party, a faction of the EPIC movement, 16 Democratic clubs and 13 union locals. Eugene Dietrich of the International Longshoremen's Association (ILA) was elected chairman and Legere was elected secretary. At the party's second conference held on August 31, San Francisco Newspaper Guild president Redfern Mason was nominated for mayor in the upcoming election.

The party's slate was finalized at a ratification convention on September 22; candidates nominated included Legere for sheriff and Anita Whitney for the Board of Supervisors. The party boasted support from 35 labor unions representing over 60,000 workers, as well as high-profile figures such as state assemblyman William Moseley Jones, ILA organizer Harry Bridges, and Thomas Mooney. This support evidently didn't carry over into the November election; the United Labor ticket was defeated in a landslide, with Mason earning only 14,267 votes (less than 8%).

=== End of popular fronts ===
The period suddenly came to an end with another abrupt reversal of Soviet and Communist policy, when the Soviet Union signed the Molotov–Ribbentrop Pact with Nazi Germany in August 1939, dividing Central and Eastern Europe into German and Soviet spheres of influence, and leading to the Soviet takeover of the Baltic Republics and Finland. Comintern parties then turned from a policy of anti-fascism to one of advocating peace with Germany, maintaining that World War II was not a fight against Nazi aggression, but "the Second Imperialist War" in which workers had no stake. Many party members quit the party in disgust, but many communists in France and other countries refused to enlist in their countries' forces until June 1941, when Germany invaded the Soviet Union and the Communist line reversed yet again.

=== Critics and defenders of policy ===
Leon Trotsky and his far-left supporters roundly criticised the coalition strategy of popular fronts. Trotsky believed that only united fronts could ultimately be progressive, and that popular fronts were useless because they included fundamentally hostile liberal bourgeois forces. Trotsky argued that in popular fronts, working-class independence is compromised and their demands are reduced to a bare minimum. That view is still common to most Trotskyist groups. Left communist groups came to oppose popular fronts as well as united fronts.

In 1977, the eurocommunist leader Santiago Carrillo offered a positive assessment of the Popular Front. He argued that in Spain, despite the passionate excesses of civil war, the period of coalition government in Republican areas "contained in embryo the conception of an advance to socialism with democracy, with a multi-party system, parliament, and liberty for the opposition". Carrillo, however criticised the Communist International for not taking the Popular Front strategy far enough, especially since French communists were restricted to supporting Blum's government from without, rather than becoming full coalition partners.

== Soviet bloc ==
Immediately after World War II, most Central and Eastern European countries were ruled by coalitions among several political parties. As the Eastern Bloc governments developed into Marxist–Leninist states, the non-communist parties pushed out members not willing to take direction from communists. These parties were taken over by fellow travellers, and the front turned into a tool of the communists. The non-communist parties were tolerated, provided they accepted the communist party's "leading role".

For example, East Germany was ruled by a "National Front" of all parties and movements within Parliament (Socialist Unity Party of Germany, Liberal Party, Farmers' Party, Youth Movement, Trade Union Federation etc.). At legislative elections, voters were presented with a single list of candidates from all parties.

The People's Republic of China's United Front is perhaps the best known example of a post-war popular front. It is nominally a coalition of the Chinese Communist Party and eight minor parties which were independent before the Chinese Civil War. Noncommunists splintered out to join the Nationalists in Taiwan, and the parties remaining in mainland China were taken over by Communist Party sympathizers or, in some cases, actual members.

=== Soviet republics ===
In the republics of the Soviet Union, between around 1988 and 1992, the term "Popular Front" had quite a different meaning. It referred to movements led by members of the liberal-minded intelligentsia (usually themselves members of the local Communist Party), in some republics small and peripheral but in others broad-based and influential. Officially, their aim was to defend perestroika against reactionary elements within the state bureaucracy, but over time, they began to question the legitimacy of their republics' membership of the Soviet Union. It was their initially cautious tone that gave them considerable freedom to organise and to gain access to the mass media. In the Baltic republics, they soon became the dominant political force and gradually gained the initiative from the more radical dissident organisations established earlier by moving their republics towards greater autonomy and then independence. They also became the main challengers to the communist parties' hegemony in Byelorussia, Moldavia, Ukraine, Armenia and Azerbaijan. A Popular Front was established in Georgia but remained marginal, compared to the dominant dissident-led groups, since the 9 April tragedy had radicalised society and so it was unable to play the compromise role of similar movements. In the other republics, such organisations existed but never posed a meaningful threat to the incumbent party and economic elites.

== List of popular fronts ==
=== Popular fronts in non-communist countries ===
The French Front populaire and the Spanish Frente Popular popular fronts of the 1930s are the most notable ones.

- Popular Front (UK), an unofficial electoral alliance from 1936 to 1939 between the Communist Party of Great Britain, supporters of the Labour Party, the Liberal Party and the Independent Labour Party and anti-appeasers in the Conservative Party.
- Popular Front (France), left-wing anti-fascist coalition in France in the 1930s, was led by Léon Blum's French Section of the Workers' International but also included communists and social democrats.
- New Popular Front, a broad left-wing electoral alliance in France launched on 10 June 2024.
- Popular Front (Spain), an electoral coalition formed in Spain in 1936 before the Spanish Civil War, led by the Republican Left but also included communists, socialists and regional nationalists.
- Popular Front (Chile) Frente popular, an electoral and political left-wing coalition in Chile from 1937 to February 1941.
- People's Democratic Front (Indonesia)
- Popular Democratic Front (Italy) Fronte Democratico Popolare, a coalition of communists and socialists for the 1948 Italian parliamentary election.
- Palestine Liberation Organization, formed in 1964 as a confederation of Palestinian nationalist groups opposed to Israel's statehood and led by Fatah, which means "to conquer."
- Unidad Popular, a coalition of left wing, socialist and communist political parties in Chile that stood behind the successful candidacy of Salvador Allende for the 1970 Chilean presidential election.
- Tripartite Alliance, a political alliance formed between the African National Congress, South African Communist Party and the Congress of South African Trade Unions in 1985.
- Popular Front (Burkina Faso), a political alliance that was formed in 1987 by President Blaise Compaoré and organised pro-government leftist parties.
- United Progressive Alliance, a coalition of leftist and centre-left parties in India formed in 2004 and led by the Indian National Congress.
- Broad Front (Uruguay), a coalition of centre-left and left-wing parties that started to rule Uruguay in 2005.
- Broad Front (Peru), a coalition of left-wing parties founded in 2013.
- Grand Alliance (Bangladesh), a leftist political alliance that includes the left-wing Awami League, the socialist Jatiya Samajtantrik Dal and the communist Workers Party.
- With the Strength of the People, an electoral coalition formed by Brazil's Workers' Party and including social democrats, communists, socialists and other groups.
- Popular Front (Tunisia) Front populaire pour la réalisation des objectifs de la révolution, formed in Tunis in October 2012 as part of the Arab Spring.
- Great Patriotic Pole, an electoral coalition formed in 2012 to unite various left-wing parties in support of Hugo Chávez and led by the United Socialist Party of Venezuela.
- Kansanrintamahallitus (Popular Bloc Coalition) is and was a coalition in Finnish parliamentary politics, mainly made up of the Agrarian Centre Party, Social Democrats and the communist Finnish People's Democratic League. (Note: There are varying definitions for a Popular Front in Finland, both historically and in modern use. For example, Aimo Kaarlo Cajander's III Cabinet of the Agrarian Union, Social Democrats, National Progressives(Liberals) and the Swedish Folks Party was called the first "Red-Brown Coalition"(Punamulta), a coalition where the two largest parties were the Agrarian Union/Centre Party and the Social Democrats, but the coalition could have the National Progressives(Liberals) and/or the Swedish Folks Party supporting the coalition. Post WW2 however, as the Communist SKDL became a large player in the parliament of Finland, there started to form a three-way coalition between the Agrarian Union/Centre Party, Social Democrats and the Communists, by format the actual "Popular Bloc", such as Mauno Pekkala's Cabinet or Mauno Koivisto's I Cabinet. What makes the definition more confusing is that in 2019 Antti Rinne's government was formed of the Social Democrats, Centre Party (Agrarians), Greens, Left Alliance (Left/far-left parties) and the Swedish Folks party. Rinne himself called the new 5-party coalition a "New Red-Brown Coalition", but many in the media called it a "New Popular Bloc")
- United Alliance Nicaragua Triumphs an electoral coalition formed in 2006 led by the Sandinista National Liberation Front.

=== Popular fronts in post-Soviet countries ===
These are non-socialist parties unless indicated otherwise.

The following movements were part of glasnost and perestroika during the 1980s
Republic	Main nationalist movement (foundation date)
Russian SFSR	Democratic Russia (1990)
Ukrainian SSR	People's Movement of Ukraine (Narodnyi Rukh Ukrajiny) (November 1988)
Byelorussian SSR	Belarusian Popular Front (October 1988), Renewal (Andradzhen'ne) (June 1989)
Uzbek SSR	Unity (Birlik) (November 1988)
Kazakh SSR	Nevada Semipalatinsk Movement (February 1989)
Georgian SSR	People's Front (June 1988)
Azerbaijan SSR	Azerbaijani Popular Front Party Azərbaycan Xalq Cəbhəsi Partiyası; (July 1988)
Lithuanian SSR	Reform Movement of Lithuania (Lietuvos Persitvarkymo Sąjūdis) (June 1988)
Moldavian SSR	Popular Front of Moldova Frontul Popular din Moldova; (May 1989)
Latvian SSR	Popular Front of Latvia Latvijas Tautas fronte;(July 1988)
Kirghiz SSR	Openness (Ashar) (July 1989)
Tajik SSR	Openness (Ashkara) (June 1989)
Armenian SSR	Karabakh movement (February 1988)
Turkmen SSR	Unity (Agzybirlik) (January 1990)
Estonian SSR	Popular Front of Estonia (Eestimaa Rahvarinne) (April 1988)
Autonomous Republic	Main nationalist movement (foundation date)
South Ossetian AO	Adamon Nykhaz (1988)
Tatar ASSR	Tatar Public Center (Tatar İctimağí Üzäge) (February 1989)
Checheno-Ingush ASSR	All-National Congress of the Chechen People (November 1990)
Abkhaz ASSR	Unity (Aidgylara) (December 1988)

These were established after the dissolution of the Soviet Union in 1991:

- All-Russia People's Front Общероссийский народный фронт, created in 2011 by Prime Minister Vladimir Putin to provide United Russia with "new ideas, new suggestions and new faces" and intended to be a coalition between the ruling party and numerous non-United Russia nongovernmental organizations.

== List of national fronts ==
=== In current communist countries ===
- People's Republic of China, the United Front led by the Chinese Communist Party
- Socialist Republic of Vietnam, the Vietnamese Fatherland Front led by the Communist Party of Vietnam (succeeded the North Vietnamese Fatherland Front of 1955 to 1977 and two 'Viet Cong' fronts in South Vietnam), with its origins tracing back to the Viet Minh front.
- Lao People's Democratic Republic, the Lao Front for National Construction, led by the Lao People's Revolutionary Party

=== In former communist countries ===
- People's Socialist Republic of Albania – the Democratic Front, led by the Party of Labour of Albania, which succeeded the National Liberation Front of 1942 to 1945
- Democratic Republic of Afghanistan – the National Front, led by the People's Democratic Party of Afghanistan
- People's Republic of Bulgaria – the Fatherland Front, led by the Bulgarian Communist Party
- People's Republic of the Congo – the Défense Civile and then the United Democratic Forces, led by the Congolese Party of Labour
- Czechoslovak Socialist Republic – the National Front, led by the Communist Party of Czechoslovakia
- German Democratic Republic – the Democratic Bloc and then the National Front, led by the Socialist Unity Party of Germany
- People's Revolutionary Government (Grenada) – the People's Alliance, led by the New Jewel Movement
- Hungarian People's Republic – the National Independence Front led by the Hungarian Communist Party, replaced in 1949 by the Hungarian Independence People's Front, led by the Hungarian Working People's Party, and replaced by the Patriotic People's Front in 1954, which, after 1956, was led by the Hungarian Socialist Workers' Party)
- Democratic Kampuchea/People's Republic of Kampuchea – the National United Front of Kampuchea led by the Communist Party of Kampuchea which was dissolved in 1976, in 1979 the Kampuchean United Front for National Salvation led by the Kampuchean People's Revolutionary Party while the deposed CPK formed the Patriotic and Democratic Front of the Great National Union of Kampuchea in exile.
- Democratic People's Republic of Korea – Democratic Front for the Reunification of Korea, led by the Workers' Party of Korea (originated from the United Democratic National Front of 1946 to 1949), was originally founded in 1948 when North Korea was a Marxist–Leninist state. Since 1992, all Marxist references were deprecated in favor of Juche and it was dissolved in 2024.
- Polish People's Republic – the Democratic Bloc led by the Polish United Workers' Party, replaced by the Front of National Unity in 1952 and then by the Patriotic Movement for National Rebirth in 1983
- Socialist Republic of Romania – the National Democratic Front, renamed People's Democratic Front led by the Romanian Communist Party and replaced in 1968 by the Socialist Unity Front, later renamed the Socialist Democracy and Unity Front
- People's Democratic Republic of Yemen – the Unified Nationalist Front Political Organization led by the National Liberation Front before merging into the Yemeni Socialist Party in 1978
- SFR Yugoslavia – the National Front of Yugoslavia, led by the Communist Party of Yugoslavia and replaced by the Socialist Alliance of Working People of Yugoslavia in 1945

=== In former socialist countries ===
- Ba'athist Syria – the National Progressive Front (Syria), a political alliance formed in 1972 that united parties supporting the ruling Syrian government, led by the Arab Socialist Ba'ath Party.
- Ba'athist Iraq – the National Progressive Front (Iraq), a political alliance formed in 1974 that united pro-government parties led by the Arab Socialist Ba'ath Party.

== See also ==
- Entryism
- United front
