= 1935 San Francisco mayoral election =

- November 5, 1935
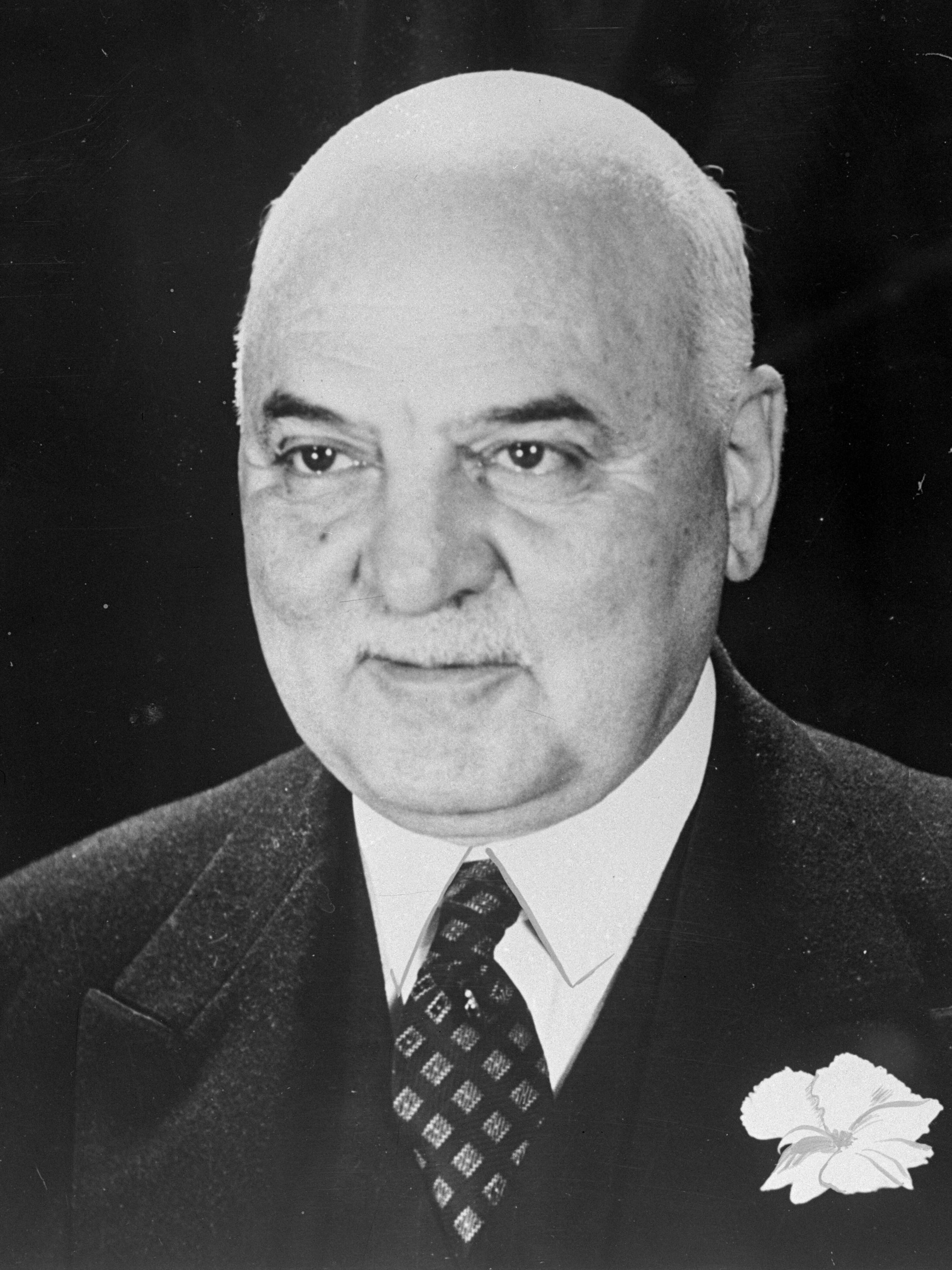

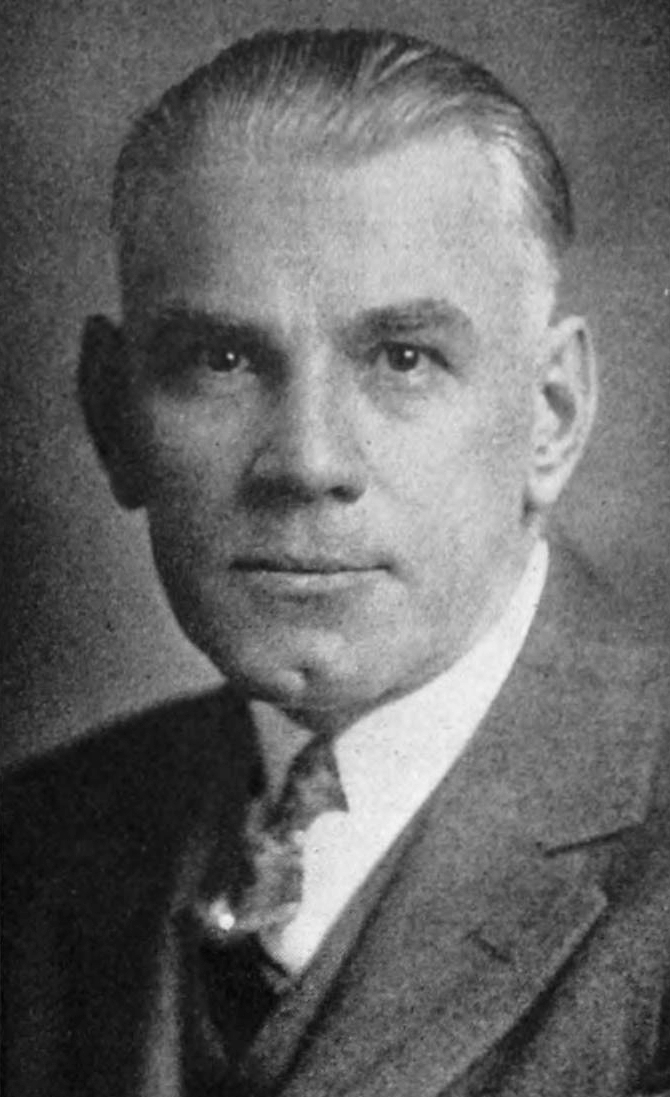

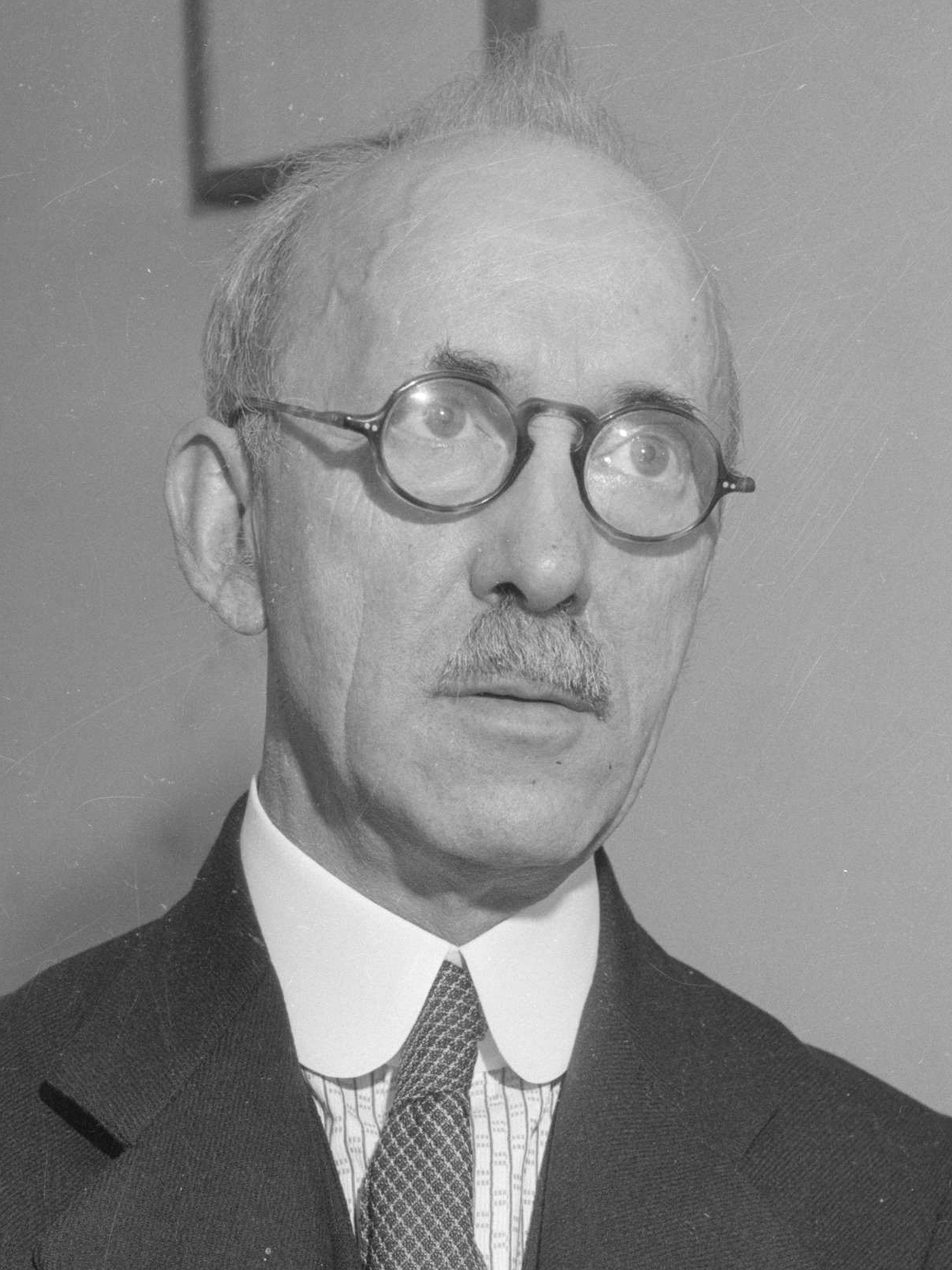
| Candidate | Angelo Joseph Rossi | Adolph Uhl | Redfern Mason |
| Party | Republican | Nonpartisan | United Labor |
| Popular vote | 96,665 | 59,129 | 14,267 |
| Percentage | 52.58% | 32.16% | 7.76% |
Mayor before election
Angelo Joseph Rossi
Republican
Elected mayor
Angelo Joseph Rossi
Republican

The 1935 San Francisco mayoral election was held on November 5, 1935. Incumbent mayor Angelo Joseph Rossi was re-elected with 53% of the vote.

== Campaign ==
=== United Labor Party ===
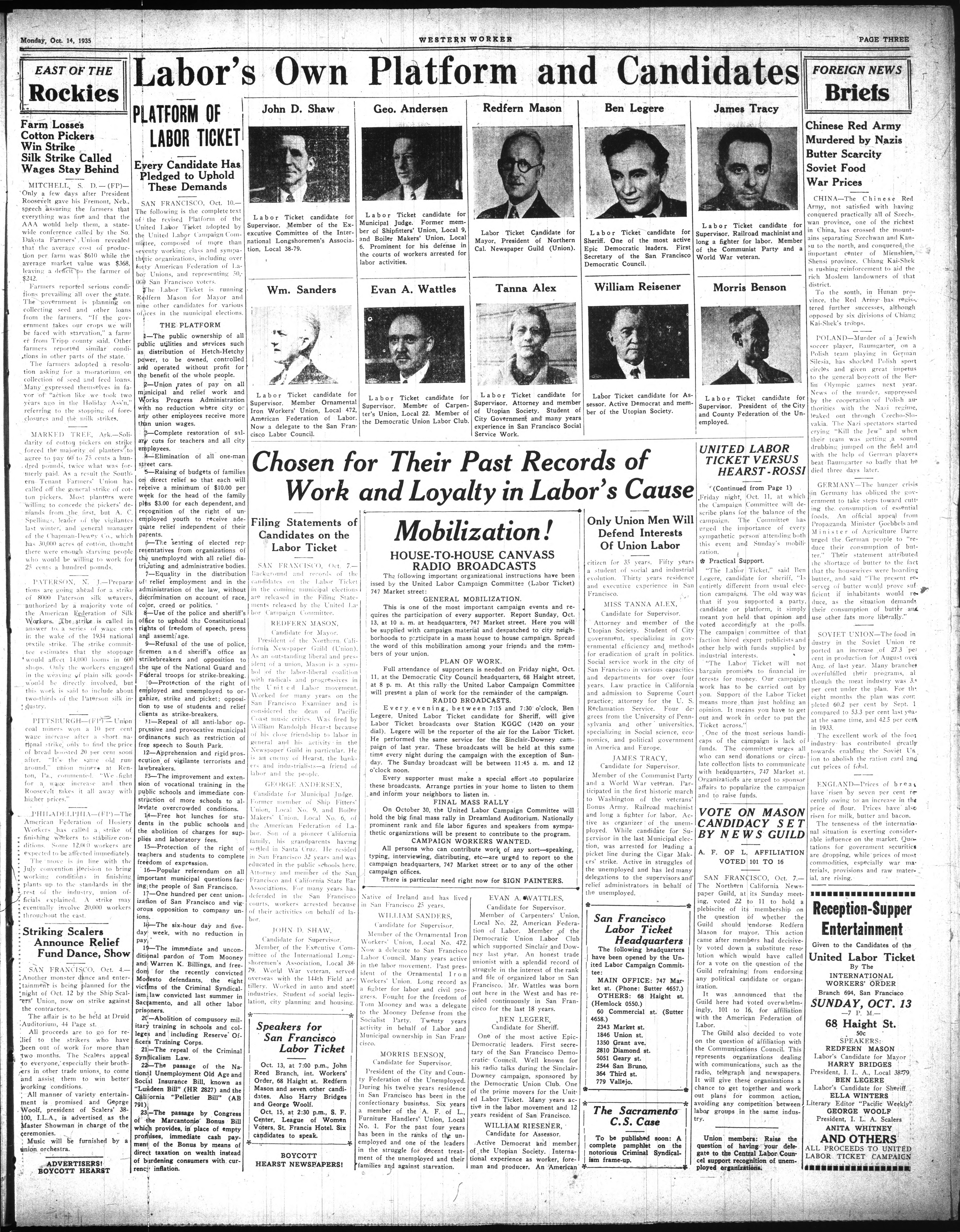
A page from the Western Worker, the west coast organ of the Communist Party USA, featuring the United Labor ticket, October 14, 1935

At a meeting of the American League Against War and Fascism in San Francisco on April 29, 1935, Samuel Adams Darcy, leader of the Communist Party USA's California district, called for a "United Labor party" composed of "Communists, Socialists, EPIC followers and other Liberals" to oppose anti-labor legislation. Less than a month later, at the annual convention of the End Poverty in California (EPIC) movement, delegate Ben Legere introduced a motion to build a popular front of "EPICs, Socialists, Communists, Laborites, Utopians, Townsendites and Technocrats... to oppose oppressive legislation, war, and fascism." Upton Sinclair, the leader of the movement, expressed his opposition to the plan, and it was voted down.

On July 19, at a conference held at the Building Trades Temple in San Francisco, the United Labor Party was founded. It brought together 37 organizations, including the Communist Party, a faction of the EPIC movement, 16 Democratic clubs and 13 union locals. Eugene Dietrich of the International Longshoremen's Association (ILA) was elected chairman and Legere was elected secretary. At the party's second conference held on August 31, San Francisco Newspaper Guild president Redfern Mason was nominated for mayor in the upcoming election.

The party's slate was finalized at a ratification convention on September 22; candidates nominated included Legere for sheriff and Anita Whitney for the Board of Supervisors. The party boasted support from 35 labor unions representing over 60,000 workers, as well as high-profile figures such as state assemblyman William Moseley Jones, ILA organizer Harry Bridges, and Thomas Mooney.

== Results ==
1935 San Francisco mayoral election
| Candidate | Votes | % |
|---|---|---|
| Angelo Joseph Rossi | 96,665 | 52.58% |
| Adolph Uhl | 59,129 | 32.16% |
| Redfern Mason | 14,267 | 7.76% |
| Harry L. Todd | 7,829 | 4.26% |
| Edward Rainey | 5,957 | 3.24% |
