= Elisabeth Christman =

American trade unionist

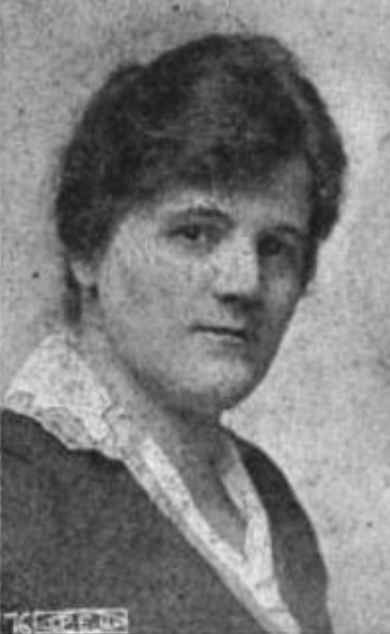
- Elisabeth Christman, from a 1918 publication
- Born: September 2, 1881; Germany
- Died: April 26, 1975 (aged 93); New Delphi, Indiana, US
- Occupation: Labor organizer

Elisabeth Christman (September 2, 1881, Germany- April 26, 1975, New Delphi, Indiana) was a trade union organizer.

Christman was born to Barbara Guth Christman and Henry Christman, a laborer and clarinet player for a union band, in Germany 1881. Her family soon moved to Chicago, Illinois after she was born. She attended a German Lutheran school until she was 13, when she left school to become a glove factory worker at the Eisendrath Glove Factory.

== Union organizing ==
In 1902, after several years of working long hours, she and her co-worker Agnes Nestor lead a successful 10-day strike out. This strike led to the creation of Glove Workers of America Local 1. Christman and 27 others formed the International Glove Workers Union of America. She served as the organization's secretary-treasurer from 1913-1931.

=== Women's Trade Union League ===
In 1903, the Women's Trade Union League was founded, and Christman became a leader at both the Chicago- and national-levels in 1904. She was one of the few working-class women to participate in the day-to-day functioning of the organization until its demise in 1950. She served many positions during her time in the League as:

- Treasurer of Local 1 (1905-1911)
- President of Local 1 (1912-1917)
- Member of the executive board (1910-1929)
- Administrator of the WTUL Training School for Women Organizers (1914-1926)
- Member of WTUL national executive board (1919)
- Secretary-treasurer of National WTUL (1921-1950)
- Delegate for the Third International Congress of Working Women (1923)
- Editor of WTUL's monthly journal Life and Labor Bulletin (1921-1950)

Christman once said, "Good times or bad, the Labor Movement can not afford to stand still."

In 1915, she led a strike at the Herzog Manufacturing Company, where she gathered over 800 workers to propose a contract. She managed to organize the workers and a contract, though most of the employees spoke little-to-no English and were new to the ideas of trade unionism.

=== United States government ===
During the First World War, she was appointed by two Republican presidents to commissions in 1921 and 1931 addressing unemployment, although she had been a Democrat her entire life. She served the United States government throughout the Second World War in several advisory positions such as:

- Chief of women field representatives for the National War Labor Board (1917-1918)
- Appointed member of the National Unemployment Conference (1921)
- Appointed member of the National Organization on Unemployment Relief (1931)
- Appointed member of the National Recovery Administration (1934), first woman to have this accomplishment, she was appointed by long term friend Mary Anderson
- Appointed member of the National Commission on Vocational Guidance (1936)
- Appointed member of the Women's Bureau advisory committee (1940)
- Director of the Women's Bureau of investigation of women's wages in war industries (1942-1943)

In the early 1930s, Christman ran into Eleanor Roosevelt in the streets of Washington, DC and secured a room in the White House for some women in the WTUL to stay in.

== Personal life ==
Christman never married, nor did she have any children. Towards the end of her life, she spent much time in a hospital as a patient, though she also organized and led women hospital workers. She died in her niece's home of cerebral arteriosclerosis on April 26, 1975.

== See also ==
- Fannia Cohn, leader in the International Ladies' Garment Workers' Union
- Eugene V. Debs, an American labor organizer
- Elizabeth Gurley Flynn, labor leader for the Industrial Workers of the World
- Aileen Hernandez, union organizer and civil rights activist
- Mother Jones, labor organizer in the late 19th and early 20th century
- Matilda Robbins, socialist labor organizer and writer
- "Union Maid", song by Woody Guthrie that speaks on the roles of women in labor unions
- Mary van Kleeck, fellow labor organizer and feminist
