= The Times Telegram =

American newspaper

- Type: Daily newspaper
- Format: Broadsheet
- Owner: USA Today Co.
- Founded: 1898, as The Evening Telegram; May 10, 1886, as The Evening Times
- Headquarters: 111 Green Street, Herkimer, New York 13350, United States
- Circulation: 4,100 Daily (as of 2017)
- Sister newspapers: Observer-Dispatch
- Website: TimesTelegram.com

The Times Telegram is an American daily newspaper published in Herkimer, New York. It serves southern Herkimer County and the westernmost part of adjacent Montgomery County in the Mohawk Valley region of New York State.

It was formed on August 3, 2015 by the merger of The Telegram, serving Herkimer, and The Times, serving Little Falls. It is owned by USA Today Co., who also owned the two newspapers before the merger. In 1965, the Telegram was purchased by Thomson Newspapers.

The Telegram also published under the name of The Evening Telegram. The Times was also known as The Evening Times and the Little Falls Evening Times.
