= Ashar =

Tax in Ottoman Empire

Ashar (Modern Turkish: Öşür or Aşar) was a tax in the Ottoman Empire, based on the traditional practice of muqasama (which means "sharing"), a traditional tithe in the Fertile Crescent. It was abolished on 17 February 1925 in Turkey the successor of the Ottoman Empire.

Much of the Ottoman empire's tax system was inherited from earlier practices in each territory that it conquered. Muqasama had been common practice in the Mamluk empire, and much of the Middle East, even before the spread of Islam; a similar system had been used in Sassanid Persia. Muqasama was a tax directly applied to agricultural output, taking a proportion which varied between areas and between producers. These discriminatory rates caused inefficiencies; as farmers reacted to locally varying taxes on different farm products, this increased variations in agricultural output between areas, or even between villages. Farms subject to the highest taxes switched to alternative crops.

Under Ottoman rule, muqasama became known as Ashar. The name means "a tenth", although the exact proportion might vary - and it was a tithe taken from all agricultural produce. Ashar was an important source of revenue in the early Ottoman empire, as it had been for the Abbasids. Ashar was typically paid annually, to the timar holder. early forms of öşür were enforced in transit, with watchtowers on transport routes, and checkpoints at bottleneck locations such as bridges and passes.

One preserved tax-code document from Mosul in the 1540s specifies öşür shares ranging from one fifth to one sixth to a tenth, depending on the crop - more lucrative crops were subject to a larger tithe. There was very wide variation between different regions, and the tithe was extended to cotton, fish, honey, and silk as well as the usual fruit and vegetables.

Ashar was primarily collected in the Ottoman Empire's Middle Eastern territories; different tax structures were inherited in other parts of the empire, particularly in Europe. Taxation evolved over time, moving from tithes and other taxes-in-kind towards a more centralised system of taxation in cash; hence öşür was mostly superseded by taxes like avariz. However, a later form of tithe on farming, called, asar, was reintroduced during the tanzimat reforms.
