= Observer-Dispatch =

Newspaper in Utica, New York

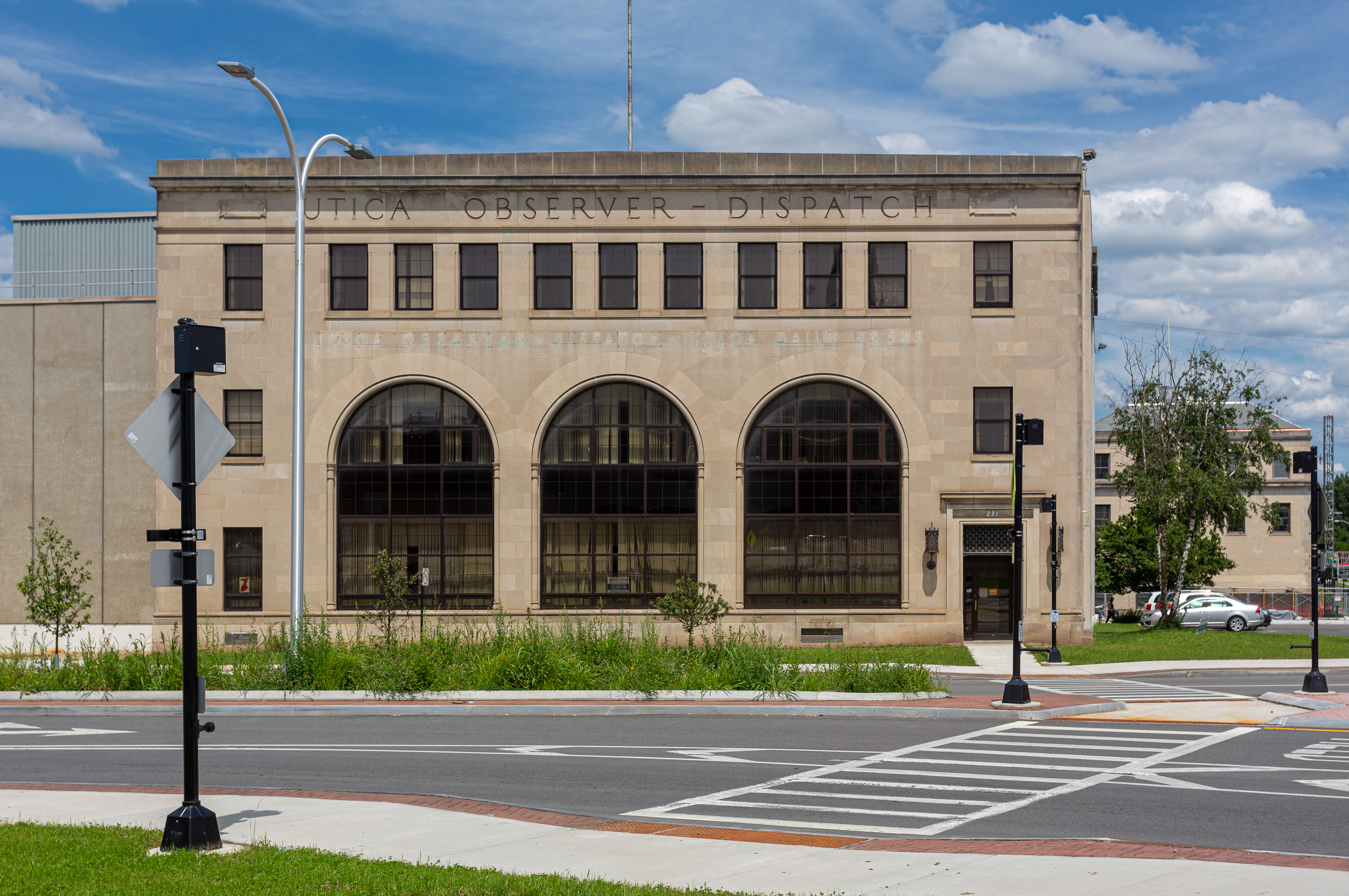
- Former Observer-Dispatch building, vacant since 2022
- Type: Daily newspaper
- Format: Broadsheet
- Owner: USA Today Co.
- Founded: 1817, as Utica Observer
- Headquarters: 221 Oriskany Plaza, Utica, New York, United States
- Circulation: 17,123 Daily; 21,444 Sunday (as of 2018)
- Sister newspapers: The Times Telegram
- ISSN: 0890-0329
- OCLC number: 10886202
- Website: uticaod.com

The Observer-Dispatch, often referred to as The O-D, is a newspaper serving the Utica-Rome metropolitan area in Central New York, circulating in Oneida County, Herkimer County, and parts of Madison County. Based in Utica, New York, the publication is owned by USA Today Co..

== History ==
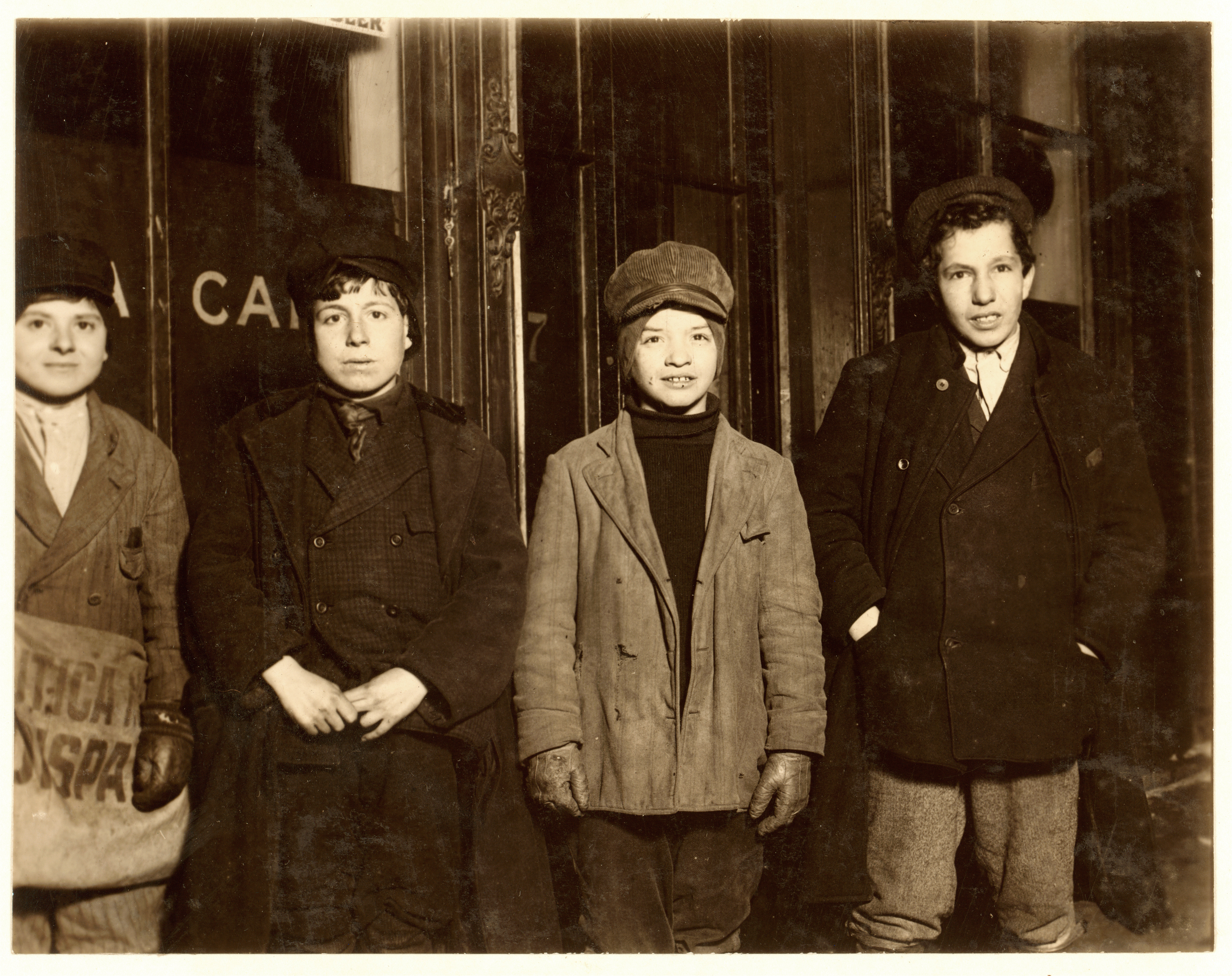
Newsboys for one of the precursors of The Observer-Dispatch in 1910, photographed by Lewis Hine

Eliasaph Dorchester founded the weekly Utica Observer in 1817. The paper briefly moved to Rome, New York and published under the name of the Oneida Observer, but returned to Utica after. The paper consolidated with the Utica Democrat in 1852, bringing with it long-time editor Dewitt C. Grove, who simultaneously served as mayor of Utica from 1860 to 1862. The Observer's facilities were destroyed in 1884 by a fire. Construction began in 1914 on a new office for the Observer, which was completed in 1915. The two-story building was expanded to three stories in 1930, with the name "Utica Observer-Dispatch" engraved in the stone above the third story windows.

In 1922 the paper was purchased by Frank E. Gannett, founder of the Gannett Company. Gannett purchased the Herald-Dispatch at the same time and combined the two, creating the Utica Observer-Dispatch. Gannet also purchased the Utica Daily Press in 1935. The Utica Daily Press and the Utica Observer-Dispatch merged in 1987, and were renamed to the current Observer-Dispatch. Gannett owned the newspaper until 2007, when it was purchased by GateHouse Media. GateHouse Media's parent company merged with Gannett in 2019, returning the Observer-Dispatch to Gannett once more.

In the late 1990s and early 2000s, the O-D had a weekly Bosnian language column serving the Bosnian American population in Utica.

The company added digital delivery of news and information in January 2000 with the launch of uticaOD.com. It began online video publication in 2006.

In 2004, the Observer-Dispatch purchased the Mid York Weekly newspaper, serving Hamilton, New York, and seven weekly Pennysaver publications, which are mailed throughout Oneida and Herkimer counties.

The paper ceased printing its Saturday edition starting in March 2022. Also in March, the Observer-Dispatch building was purchased by a real estate investment group, and eventually occupied by a cannabis dispensary.

On October 23, 2023, the paper switched from carrier to postal delivery via the U.S. Postal Service.

== Awards ==
The Utica Daily Press and the Utica Observer-Dispatch were jointly awarded the 1959 Pulitzer Prize for Public Service:

For their successful campaign against corruption, gambling and vice in their home city and the achievement of sweeping civic reforms in the face of political pressure and threats of violence.
