= Matilda Robbins =

Russian-born American socialist labor organizer (1887–1963)

Matilda G. Robbins
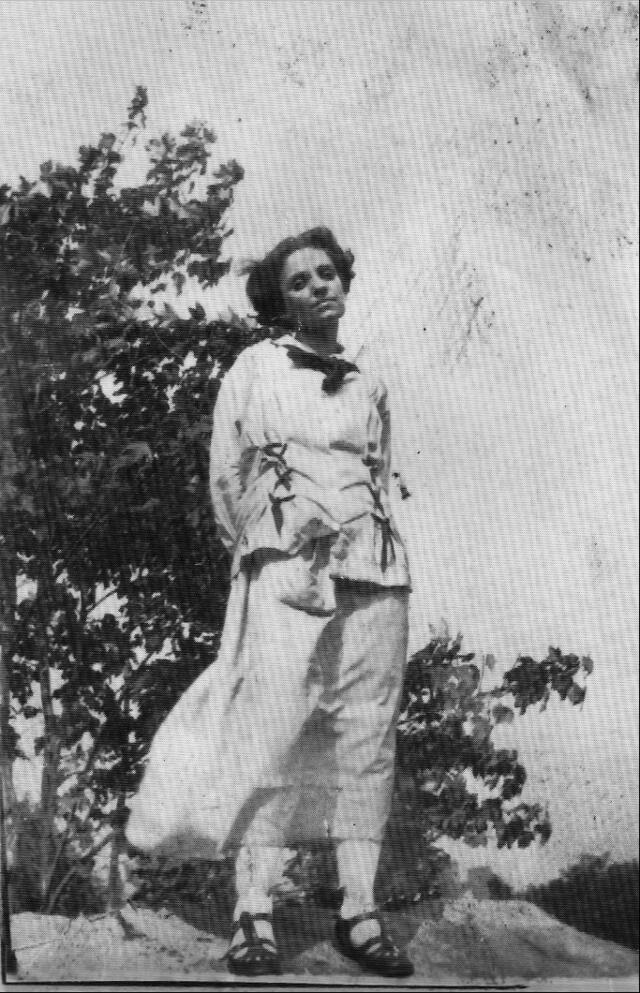
- Born: Tatiana Gitel Rabinowitz; 1887; Lityn, Russian Empire
- Died: January 9, 1963 (aged 75–76); Oakland, California, U.S.
- Partner: Ben Legere

Matilda Getrude Robbins (1887 – January 9, 1963) was a Russian-born American socialist labor organizer who first connected with the Industrial Workers of the World during the 1912 Bread and Roses strike in Lawrence, Massachusetts.

== Early life ==
Tatiana Gitel Rabinowitz (According to the ship's manifest where names of entering immigrants are listed, Matilda's original given name was Taube (Yiddish or German for 'dove'; however, she claimed a Russian given name, Tanya.) was born in Lityn, Ukraine. She moved to New York with her family at age 13, in 1900. Her name was anglicized to Matilda Gertrude Robbins in the process of immigration.

== Career ==
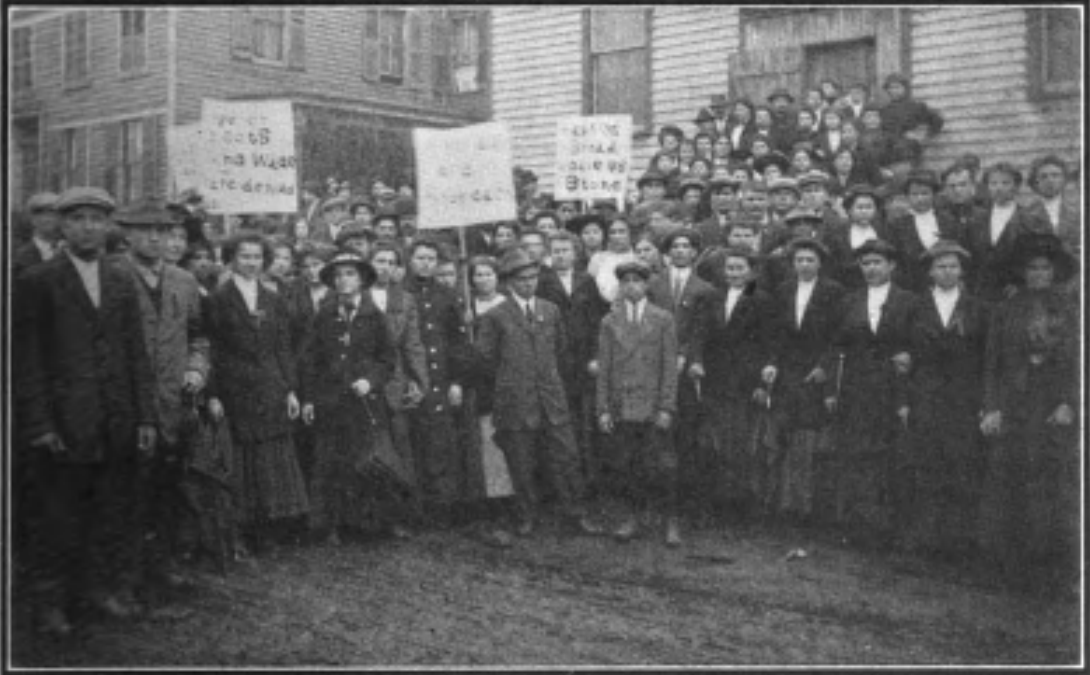
Rabinowitz, front row, fourth from left, during the 1912 Little Falls textile strike

Robbins started working as a teenager in a shirtwaist factory, and worked various jobs from age 16 onward. In Bridgeport, Connecticut she made her first connections to the Socialist Party and the Industrial Workers of the World (IWW). Robbins became a key organizer during a strike in Little Falls, New York, running the strike office, organizing a strike kitchen, raising money and legal aid, and fortifying the picket line over the course of fourteen weeks. Robbins and activist Elizabeth Gurley Flynn were then hired by the IWW and spent three years traveling across the United States to assist with labor organizing.

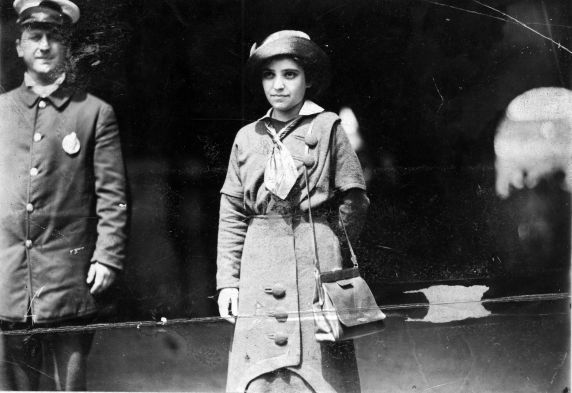
Likely taken after her arrest in Detroit, Michigan. Photograph back reads: "Rabinowitz on the way to the workhouse - Patrol Kindley (illeg.) by police department"

She was one of only two women organizers for the IWW during its early years, along with Flynn. She was arrested for her organizing work in East Liverpool, Ohio, in McKeesport, Pennsylvania, and in Detroit, Michigan, all in 1913. Later she was active in the IWW's Sacco-Vanzetti Defense Committee.

Robbins wrote for the IWW publications for many years after leaving active organizing, and she ran the Socialist Party's Los Angeles office from 1945 to 1947.

== Personal life ==
Robbins had a longtime relationship with another labor organizer, Benjamin J. Legere (1887–1972). They were parents together of a daughter, Vita, born in 1919. Robbins died in 1963, aged 76 years, in Oakland, California. Her granddaughter Robbin Légère Henderson, an artist, prepared illustrations for the 2017 publication of Robbins's memoirs, from a manuscript written in the 1950s.

According to a 2020 Industrial Worker article, Legere was abusive and sometimes violent towards Robbins. They divorced in 1926.
