= James S. Pula =

James S. Pula (born 18 February 1946 in Utica, New York) is a Polish-American historian, professor, author, and Polonia activist.

He is a professor at Purdue University North Central, and specializes in ethnic and immigration studies and 19th-century American history.

He has served as president of the Polish American Historical Association and editor of Polish American Studies: A Journal of Polish American History and Culture. He has a daughter, Marcia, and a son, Michael. With four grandchildren the oldest being Haley.
