= Ben Legere =

Labor organizer

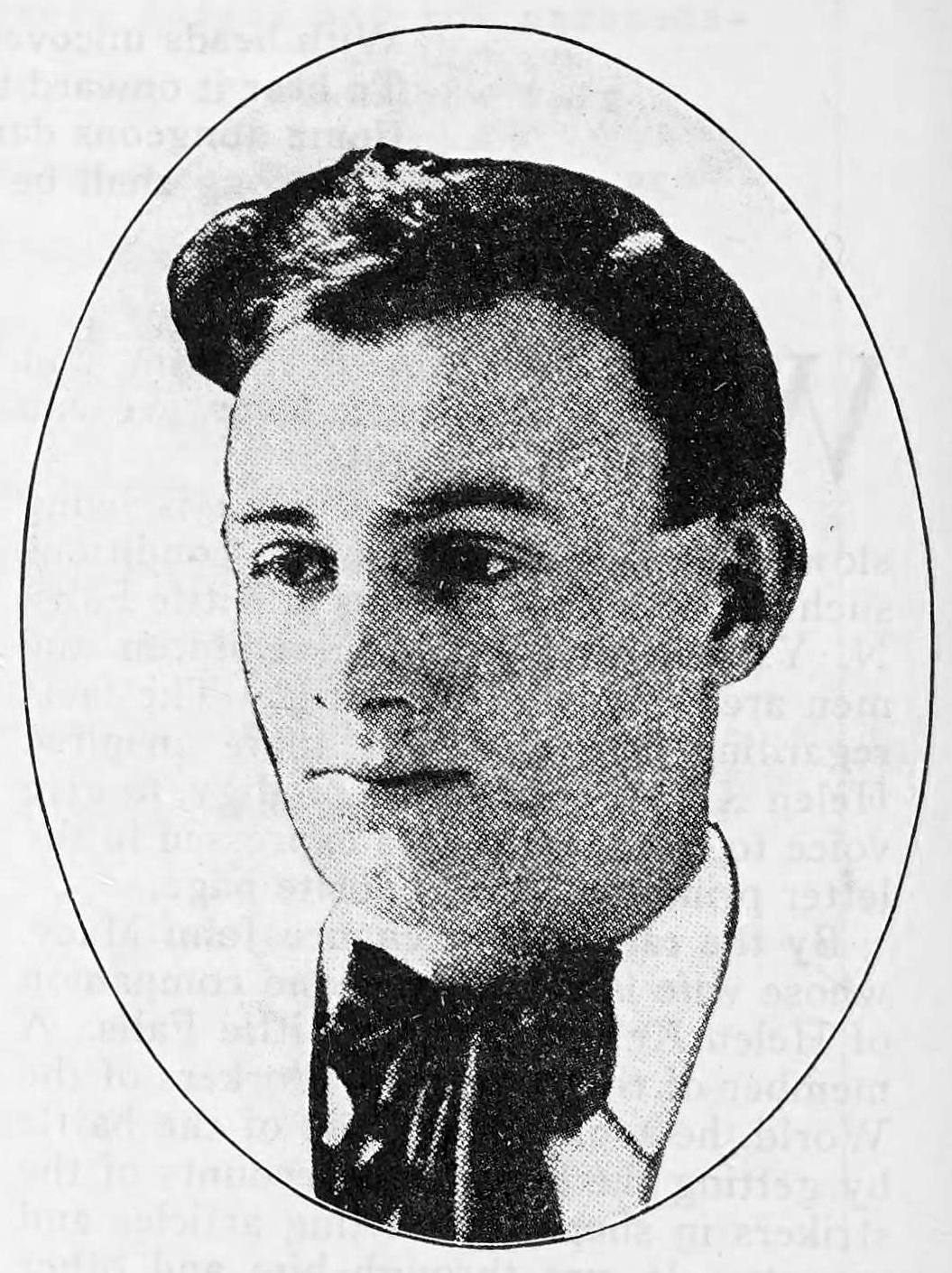
- Legere c. 1913
- Born: May 30, 1887; Taunton, Massachusetts, U.S.
- Died: January 29, 1972 (aged 84); San Francisco, California, U.S.
- Occupation: Labor leader
- Partner: Matilda Robbins

Benjamin J. Legere (May 30, 1887 – January 29, 1972) was a union organizer for the IWW and OBU within New England & Canada during the life of those labor groups.

== Career ==
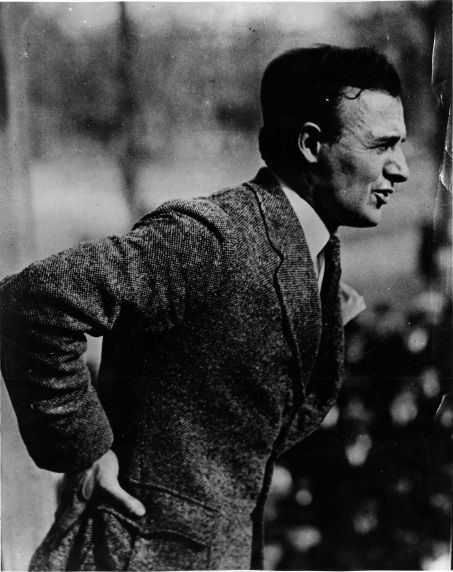
Legere c. 1910s

In the 1900s, Legere lived in Bridgeport, Connecticut. There he worked as a machinist and railroad clerk. He was a member of the Socialist Party's industrial union wing and aided Connecticut textile workers during the spring of 1912. He also late coordinated speaking tours for Ettor-Giovanitti defense committee.

That fall, the IWW sent him to help textile strikers during the 1912–1913 Little Falls textile strike. He was quickly arrested on trumped charges, spending a year in jail until release. He then began a career as a professional actor. While touring Canada in 1919, he saw the unrest that led to the Winnipeg General Strike. He also became the General Executive Board of the Canadian One Big Union (OBU). At some point he ended up being deported to the United States by the Royal Canadian Mounted Police for his beliefs but continued to advocate for the OBU.

At the end of 1920 he formally split with the Amalgamated Textile Workers' Union. This was following the 1920 wage cuts that would lead up to the 1922 New England Textile Strike. After those wage cuts, he came to Lawrence, Massachusetts (the same time he formally split) to organize for a strike. In 1922, he was one of the labor leaders of that textile strike.

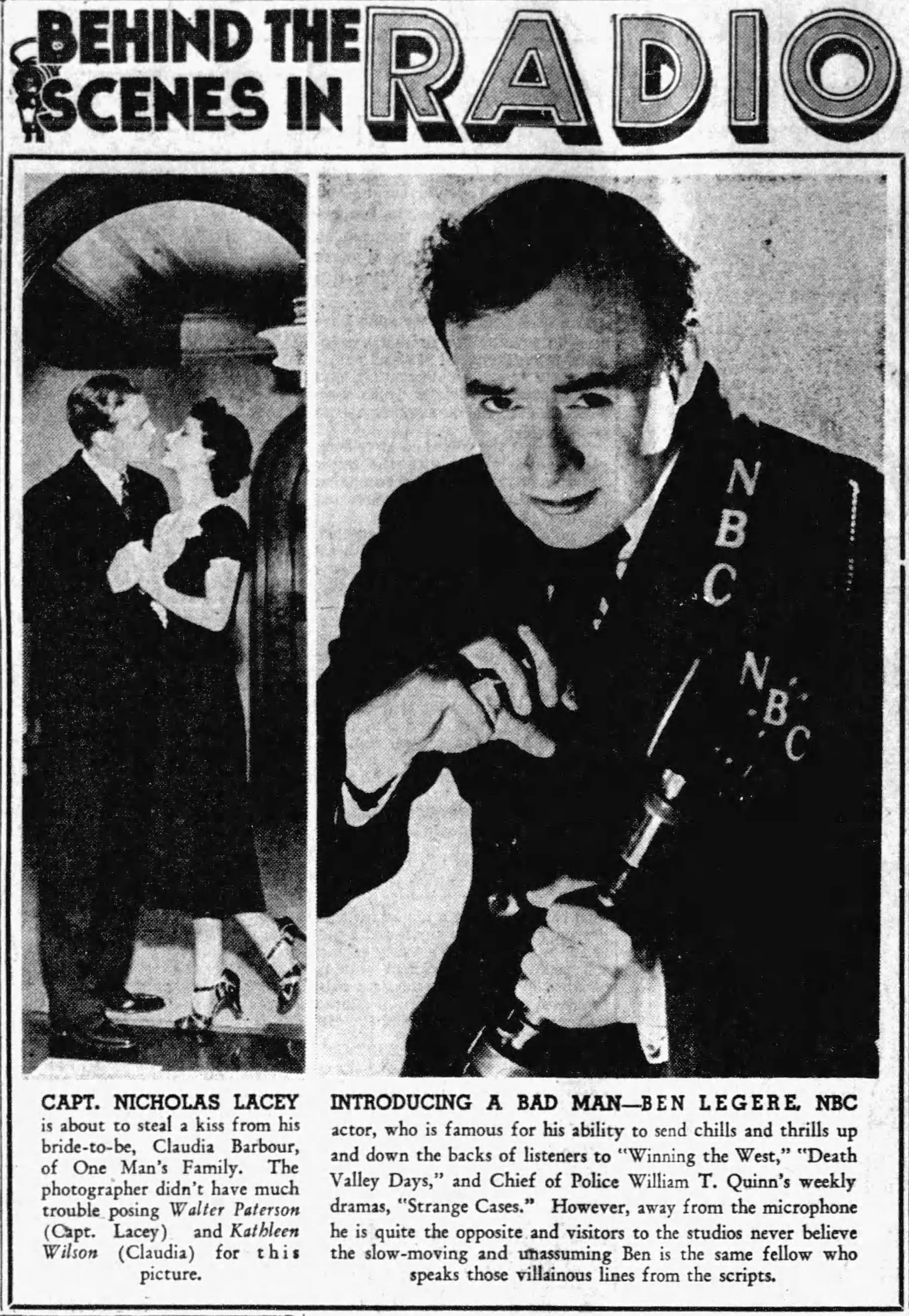
Legere in The San Francisco News, May 24, 1935

In the mid-1920s, Legere moved to the west coast and settled in San Francisco, where he worked in theater and radio as a playwright, actor, director and critic. During the 1934 California gubernatorial election, Legere was a reporter for the "Sinclair-Downey union labor radio." By 1935, he was secretary of the San Francisco council of the California Democratic Party, but broke with the party later that year and unsuccessfully ran for sheriff on the United Labor ticket.

== Personal life ==
Legere, more commonly known as Ben, was born in Taunton, Massachusetts, on May 30, 1887. Legere had a longtime relationship with another labor organizer, Matilda Robbins. They were parents together of a daughter, Vita, born in 1919. Robbins died in 1963, aged 76 years, in Oakland, California. Legere died in San Francisco on January 29, 1972.

According to a 2020 Industrial Worker article, Legere was abusive and sometimes violent towards his wife. They divorced in 1926.
