= Local union =

Locally based trade union organization which forms part of a larger union

A local union (often shortened to local), in North America, or union branch (known as a lodge in some unions), in the United Kingdom and other countries, is a local branch (or chapter) of a usually national trade union. The terms used for sub-branches of local unions vary from country to country and include "shop committee", "shop floor committee", "board of control", "chapel", and "unit," among others.

Local branches are organised to represent the union's members from a particular geographic area, company, or business sector. Local unions have their own governing bodies which represent the interests of the national union while at the same time responding to the desires of their constituents, and organise regular meetings for members. Local branches may also affiliate to a local trades council.

In the United States and Canada, local unions are usually numbered (e.g. CWA Local 2101 in Baltimore, Maryland or ILA Local 273 in Saint John, New Brunswick). In the United Kingdom, they are usually named by geographical location (e.g. Manchester Branch), but may also have a name and a number (e.g. Manchester No.2 Branch) or have a more specific name (e.g. Manchester Fitters Branch) if there is more than one branch in a town. Some unions (e.g. Transport and General Workers' Union) number their branches as well as naming them.

In the British printing industry, union branches are traditionally divided into sub-branches known as "chapels", led by the Father of the Chapel. Each chapel represents members in a single printing works or department of a larger works.
