= 1912 Lawrence textile strike =

Labor strike in Massachusetts, U.S.

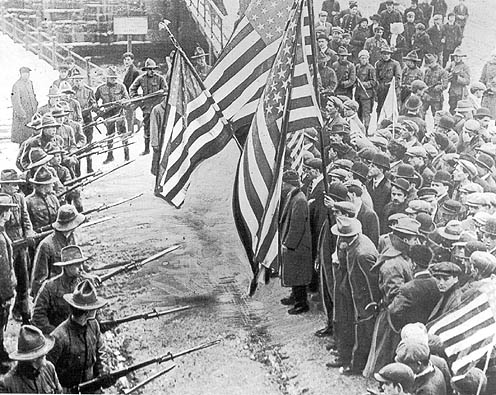
- Massachusetts militiamen with fixed bayonets surround a group of strikers
- Date: January 11 – March 14, 1912
- Location: Lawrence, Massachusetts, U.S.
- Goals: 54-hour week, 15% increase in wages, double pay for overtime work, and no bias towards striking workers
- Methods: Strikes, protests, demonstrations

Parties
Textile workers; Industrial Workers of the World (IWW)	Massachusetts; Mass. State Police; Mass. National Guard; American Woolen Co.

Lead figures
Joseph Ettor; Arturo Giovannitti; Elizabeth Gurley Flynn; Bill Haywood; Angelo G. Rocco	William M. Wood; Gov. Eugene Foss

Number
30,000	

Casualties and losses
Deaths: 3 Injuries: many Arrests: 296	Deaths: Injuries: Arrests: 3

The Lawrence Textile Strike, also known as the Bread and Roses Strike, was a strike action of immigrant workers in Lawrence, Massachusetts, in 1912 led by the Industrial Workers of the World (IWW). Prompted by a two-hour pay cut corresponding to a new law shortening the workweek for women, the strike spread rapidly through the town, growing to more than twenty thousand workers and involving nearly every mill in Lawrence. On January 1, 1912, the Massachusetts government enforced a law that cut mill workers' hours in a single work week from 56 hours, to 54 hours. Ten days later, they found out that pay had been reduced along with the cut in hours.

The strike united workers from more than 51 different nationalities. A large portion of the striking workers, including many of the leaders of the strike, were Italian immigrants. Carried on throughout a brutally cold winter, the strike lasted more than two months, from January to March, defying the assumptions of conservative trade unions within the American Federation of Labor (AFL) that immigrant, largely female and ethnically divided workers could not be organized. In late January, when a striker, Anna LoPizzo, was killed by police during a protest, IWW organizers Joseph Ettor and Arturo Giovannitti were framed and arrested on charges of being accessories to the murder.

IWW leaders Bill Haywood and Elizabeth Gurley Flynn came to Lawrence to run the strike. Together they masterminded its signature move, sending hundreds of the strikers' hungry children to sympathetic families in New York, New Jersey, and Vermont. The move drew widespread sympathy, especially after police stopped a further exodus, leading to violence at the Lawrence train station. Congressional hearings followed, resulting in exposure of shocking conditions in the Lawrence mills and calls for investigation of the "wool trust." Mill owners soon decided to settle the strike, giving workers in Lawrence and throughout New England raises of up to 20 percent. Within a year, however, the IWW had largely collapsed in Lawrence.

The Lawrence strike is often referred to as the "Bread and Roses" strike. It has also been called "the singing strike", or the "strike for three loaves". The phrase "bread and roses" actually preceded the strike, appearing in a poem by James Oppenheim published in The American Magazine in December 1911. A 1915 labor anthology, The Cry for Justice: An Anthology of the Literature of Social Protest by Upton Sinclair, attributed the phrase to the Lawrence strike, and the association stuck. A popular rallying cry from the poem was interwoven with the memory of the strike: "Hearts starve as well as bodies; give us bread, but give us roses!"

== Background ==
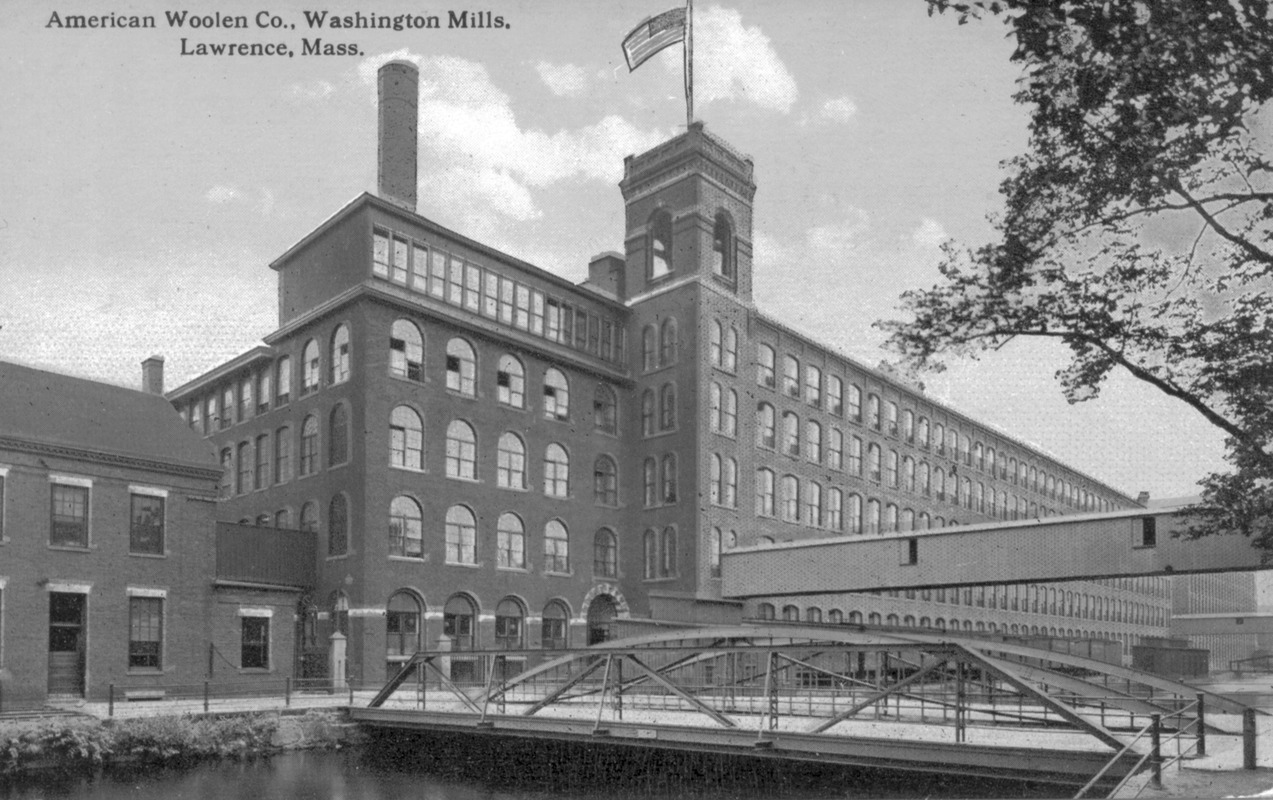
Postcard of American Woolen Co., Washington Mills, Lawrence, Mass.

Founded in 1845, Lawrence was a flourishing but deeply-troubled textile city. By 1900, mechanization and the deskilling of labor in the textile industry enabled factory owners to eliminate skilled workers and to employ large numbers of unskilled immigrant workers, mostly women. Work in a textile mill took place at a grueling pace, and the labor was repetitive and dangerous. About one third of workers in the Lawrence textile mills died before the age of 25. In addition, a number of children under 14 worked in the mills. Half of the workers in the four Lawrence mills of the American Woolen Company, the leading employer in the industry and the town, were females between 14 and 18. Falsification of birth certificates, allowing for girls younger than 14 to work, was common practice at the time. Lawrence had the 5th highest child mortality rate of any city in the country at the time, behind four other mill towns in Massachusetts (Lowell, Fall River, Worcester, and Holyoke).

By 1912, the Lawrence mills at maximum capacity employed about 32,000 men, women, and children. Conditions had worsened even more in the decade before the strike. The introduction of the two-loom system in the woolen mills led to a dramatic increase in the pace of work. The greater production enabled the factory owners to lay off large numbers of workers. Those who kept their jobs earned, on average, $8.76 for 56 hours of work and $9.00 for 60 hours of work.

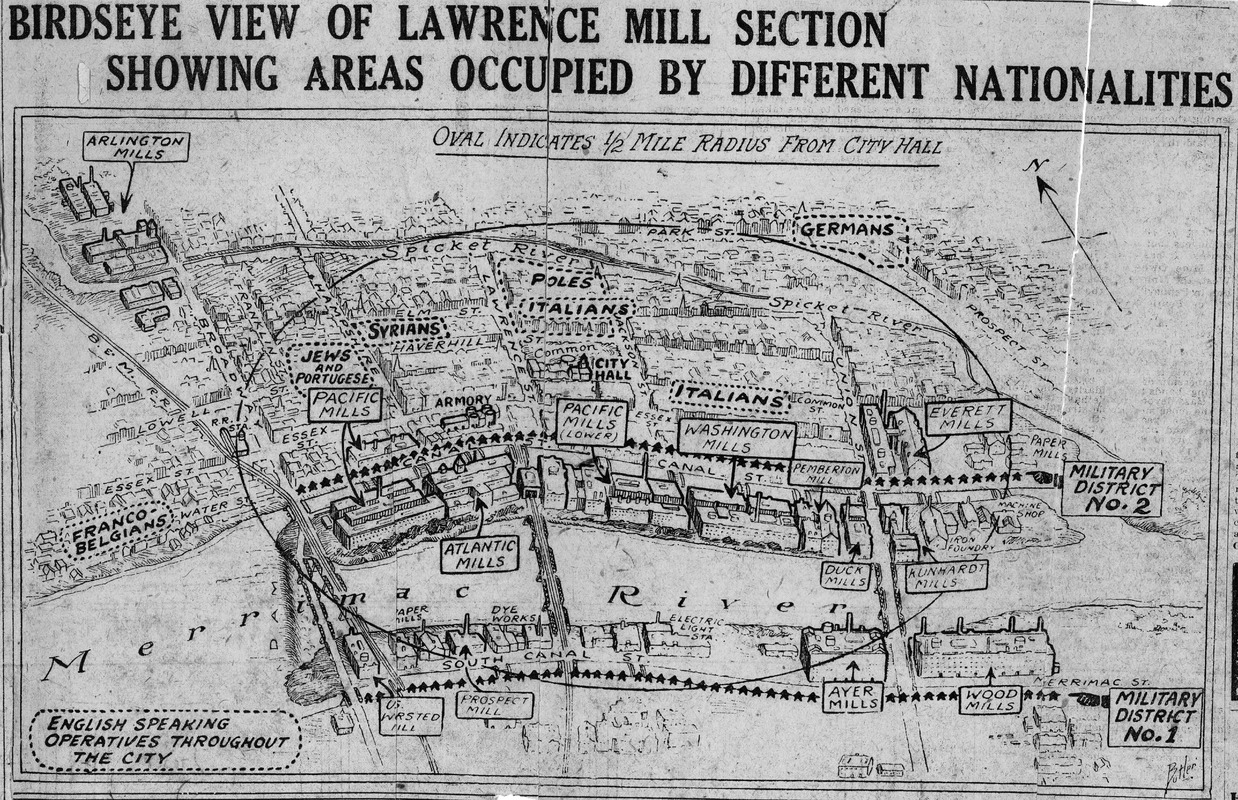
Map of areas occupied by different nationalities in Lawrence in 1910.

Some of the mills, worker housing and part of the town was owned by American Woolen Company president William Wood, who said he could not afford to pay his workers for the two hours per week they were cut, even though the company had made a profit of $3,000,000 (~$75.3 million in 2025) in 1911.

The workers in Lawrence lived in crowded and dangerous apartment buildings, often with many families sharing each apartment. Many families survived on bread, molasses, and beans; as one worker testified before the March 1912 congressional investigation of the Lawrence strike, "When we eat meat it seems like a holiday, especially for the children." Half of children died before they were six, and 36% of the adults who worked in the mill died before they were 25. The average life expectancy was 39.

The mills and the community were divided along ethnic lines: most of the skilled jobs were held by native-born workers of English, Irish, and German descent, whereas French-Canadian, Italian, Jewish, Slavic, Hungarian, Portuguese, and Syrian immigrants made up most of the unskilled workforce. Several thousand skilled workers belonged, in theory at least, to the American Federation of Labor-affiliated United Textile Workers, but only a few hundred paid dues. The Industrial Workers of the World (IWW) had also been organizing for five years among workers in Lawrence but also had only a few hundred actual members.

== Strike ==
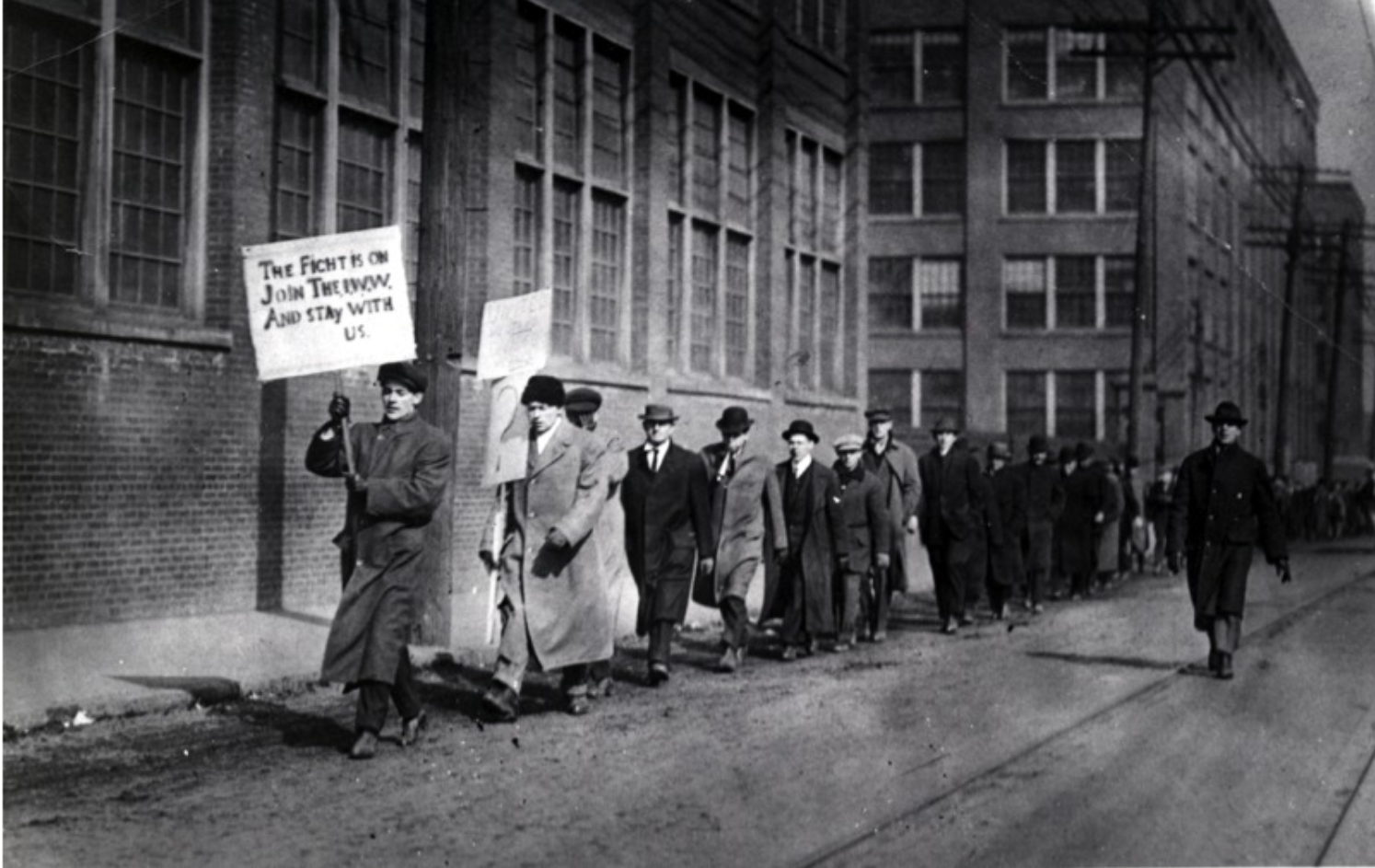
Workers picket the textile mill at the start of the strike.

On January 1, 1912, a new labor law took effect in Massachusetts reducing the working week of 56 hours to 54 hours for women and children. Workers opposed the reduction if it reduced their weekly take-home pay. The first two weeks of 1912, the unions tried to learn how the owners of the mills would deal with the new law. On January 11, a group of Polish women textile workers in Lawrence discovered that their employer at the Everett Mill had reduced about $0.32 from their total wages and walked out.

On January 12, workers in the Washington Mill of the American Woolen Company also found that their wages had been cut. Prepared for the events by weeks of discussion, they walked out, calling "short pay, all out."

Joseph Ettor of the IWW had been organizing in Lawrence for some time before the strike; he and Arturo Giovannitti of the Italian Socialist Federation of the Socialist Party of America quickly assumed leadership of the strike by forming a strike committee of 56 people, four representatives of fourteen nationalities, which took responsibility for all major decisions. The committee, which arranged for its strike meetings to be translated into 25 different languages, put forward a set of demands: a 15% increase in wages for a 54-hour work week, double pay for overtime work, and no discrimination against workers for their strike activity.

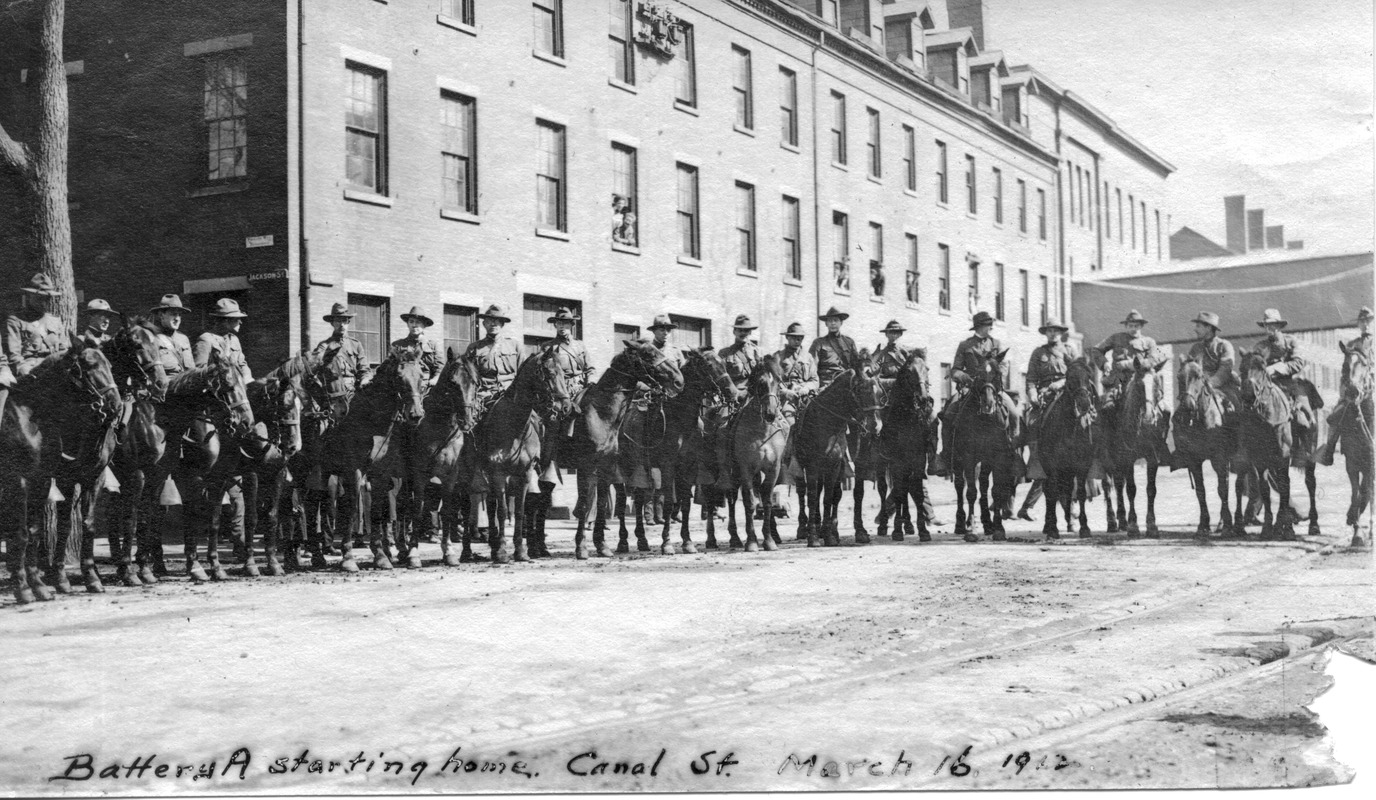
The Massachusetts National Guard mounted on horses during the strike.

The city responded to the strike by ringing the city's alarm bell for the first time in its history; the mayor ordered a company of the local militia to patrol the streets. When mill owners turned fire hoses on the picketers gathered in front of the mills, they responded by throwing ice at the plants, breaking a number of windows. The court sentenced 24 workers to a year in jail for throwing ice; as the judge stated, "The only way we can teach them is to deal out the severest sentences." Governor Eugene Foss then ordered out the state militia and state police. Mass arrests followed.

At the same time, the United Textile Workers (UTW) attempted to break the strike by claiming to speak for the workers of Lawrence. The striking operatives ignored the UTW, as the IWW had successfully united the operatives behind ethnic-based leaders, who were members of the strike committee and able to communicate Ettor's message to avoid violence at demonstrations. Ettor did not consider intimidating operatives who were trying to enter the mills as breaking the peace.

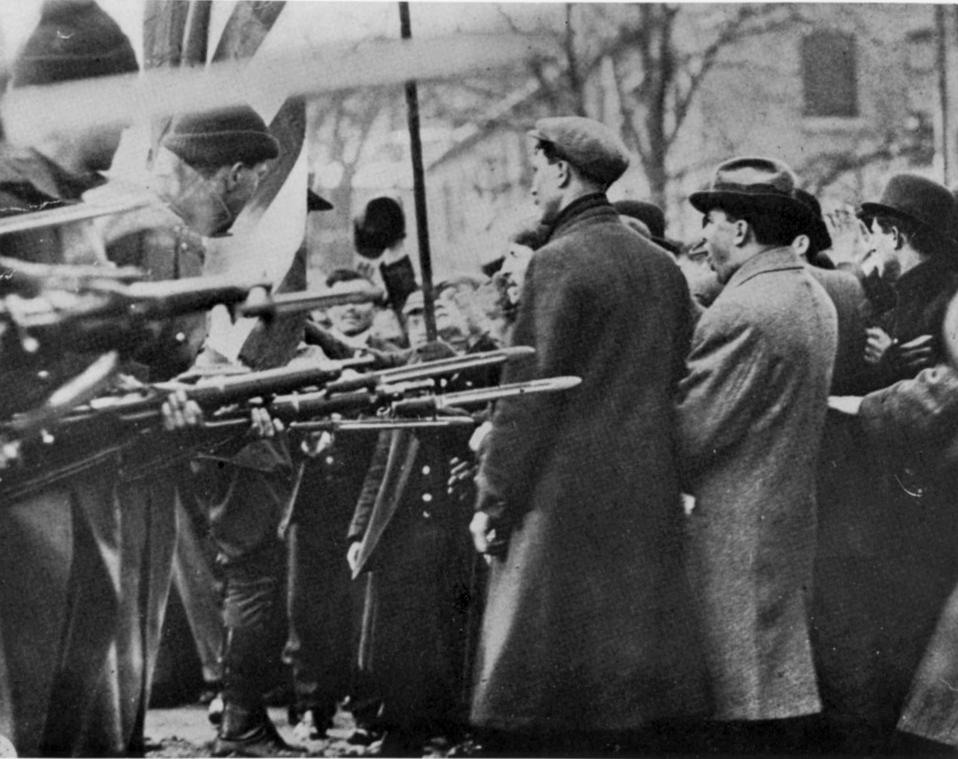
Standoff between the state militia with bayonets and workers.

The IWW was successful, even with AFL-affiliated operatives, as it defended the grievances of all operatives from all the mills. Conversely, the AFL and the mill owners preferred to keep negotiations between separate mills and their own operatives. However, in a move that frustrated the UTW, Oliver Christian, the national secretary of the Loomfixers Association and an AFL affiliate itself, said he believed John Golden, the Massachusetts-based UTW president, was a detriment to the cause of labor. That statement and missteps by William Madison Wood quickly shifted public sentiment to favor the strikers.

A local undertaker and a member of the Lawrence school board attempted to frame the strike leadership by planting dynamite in several locations in town a week after the strike began. He was fined $500 and released without jail time. Later, William M. Wood, the president of the American Woolen Company, was shown to have made an unexplained large payment to the defendant shortly before the dynamite was found.

The authorities later charged Ettor and Giovannitti as accomplices to murder for the death of striker Anna LoPizzo, who was likely shot by the police. Ettor and Giovannitti had been 3 mi (4.8 km) away, where they spoke to another group of workers. They and a third defendant, who had not even heard of either Ettor or Giovannitti at the time of his arrest, were held in jail for the duration of the strike and several months thereafter. The authorities declared martial law, banned all public meetings, and called out 22 more militia companies to patrol the streets. Harvard students were even given exemptions from their final exams if they agreed to go and try to break up the strike.

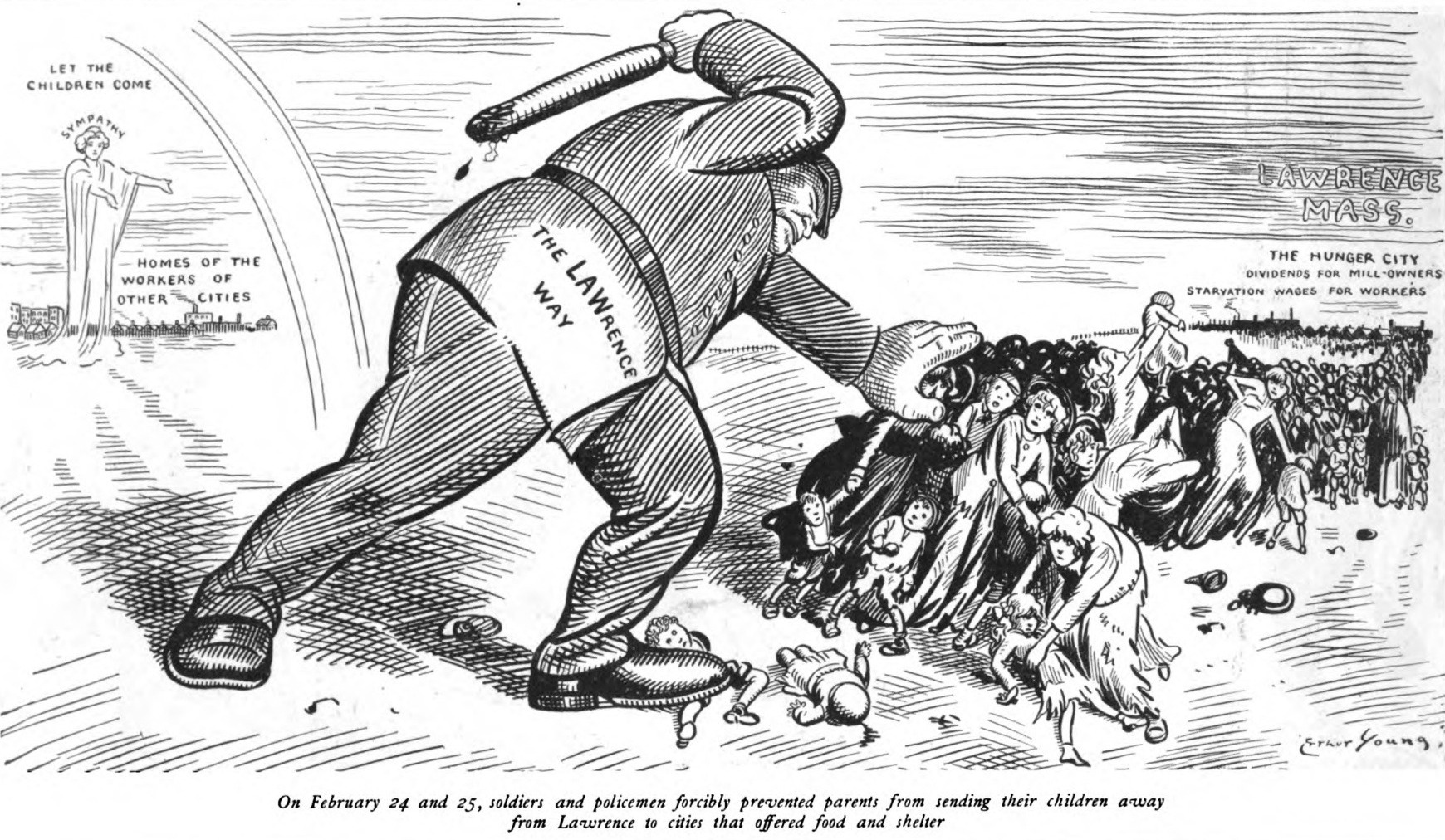
Political cartoon The Lawrence Way by Art Young with the caption: "On February 24 and 25, soldiers and policemen forcibly prevented parents from sending their children away from Lawrence to cities which offered food and shelter."

The IWW responded by sending Bill Haywood, Elizabeth Gurley Flynn, and a number of other organizers to Lawrence. Haywood participated little in the daily affairs of the strike. Instead, he set out for other New England textile towns in an effort to raise funds for the strikers in Lawrence, which proved very successful. Other tactics established were an efficient system of relief committees, soup kitchens, and food distribution stations, and volunteer doctors provided medical care. The IWW raised funds on a nationwide basis to provide weekly benefits for strikers and dramatized the strikers' needs by arranging for several hundred children to go to supporters' homes in New York City for the duration of the strike. When city authorities tried to prevent another 100 children from going to Philadelphia on February 24 by sending police and the militia to the station to detain the children and arrest their parents, the police began clubbing both the children and their mothers and dragged them off to be taken away by truck; one pregnant mother miscarried. The press, there to photograph the event, reported extensively on the attack. Moreover, when the women and children were taken to the Police Court, most of them refused to pay the fines levied and opted for a jail cell, some with babies in arms.

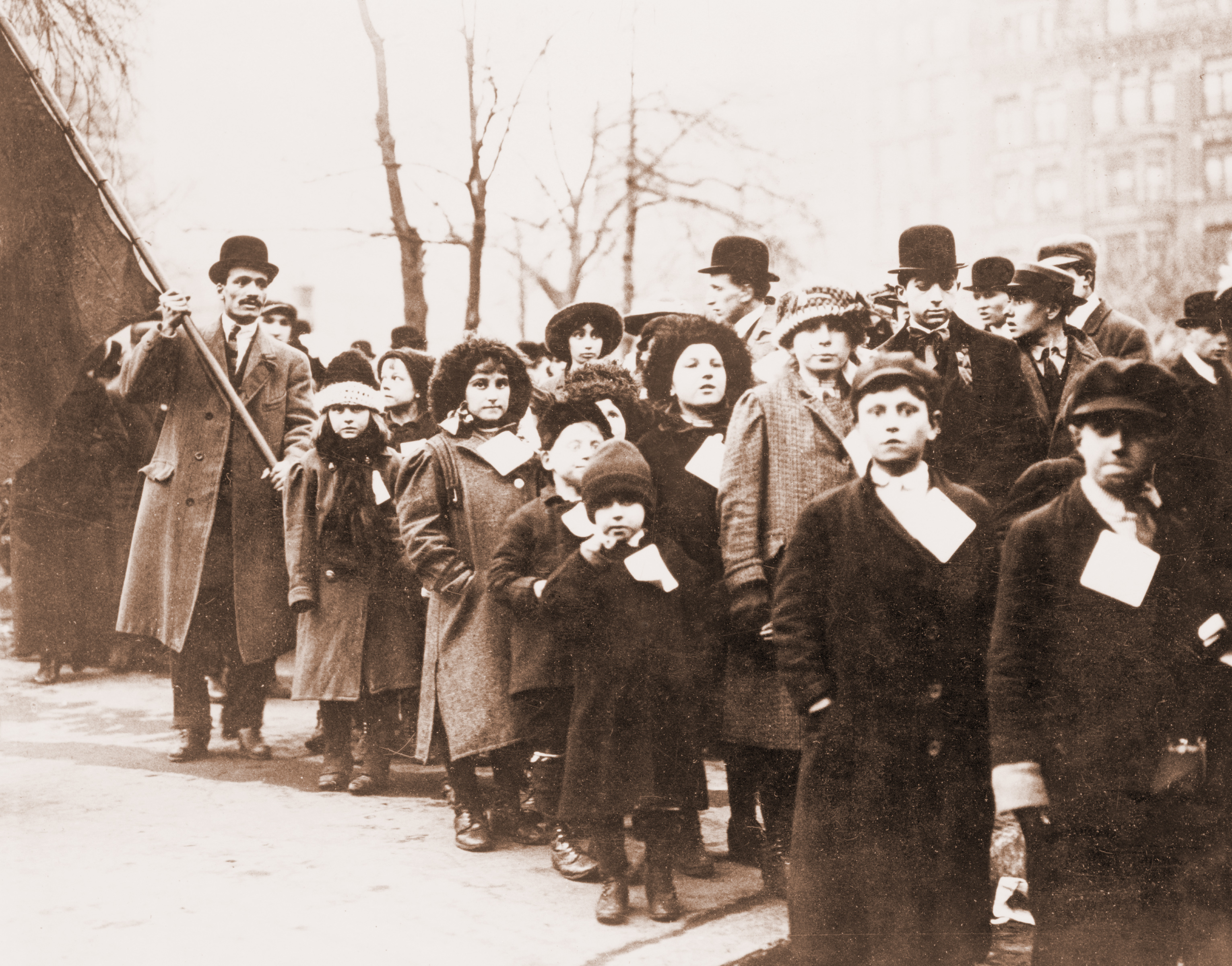
Parents sending their children to live with supporters in other cities.

The police action against the mothers and children of Lawrence attracted the attention of the nation, in particular that of first lady Helen Herron Taft, wife of President William Howard Taft. Soon, both the House and the Senate set out to investigate the strike. In the early days of March, a special House Committee heard testimony from some of the strikers' children, as well as various city, state and union officials. In the end, both chambers published reports detailing the conditions at Lawrence.

The children involved in the police riot were not only the children of striking workers, they were also striking workers themselves. Most of the workers at the mill were women and children. Families were suffering not only from the lost income of adult workers, but also the lost wages of children. Children were used several times during the strike to attract attention to the cause. On February 10, 119 children were sent to Manhattan to live with relatives, or strangers, who were able to feed them to alleviate the financial strain on the striking families. The children were welcomed in NY by cheering crowds that drew national attention. When another group of children were sent to NY, they were paraded down 5th Avenue, drawing even more attention. Embarrassed by the bad publicity, the city marshal tried to deter the next group of children that were being sent to Philadelphia on February 24, with disastrous results. Police attempted to stop the children from boarding the train and as mothers tried to force their children on board, police intervened with clubs and arrested parents and children, the latter being ferried out of the town to an orphanage. The next role that children played in the result of the strike was the testimony they gave about the working conditions in the factories. Most notable was that of Carmela Teoli, a 14-year-old mill worker who testified in front of a Congressional hearing. Teoli had been hospitalized for seven months after the cotton-twisting machine she operated had pulled her scalp off. The company paid her hospital bills, but did not provide her with sick pay. The national sympathy that children elicited changed the outcome of the strike.

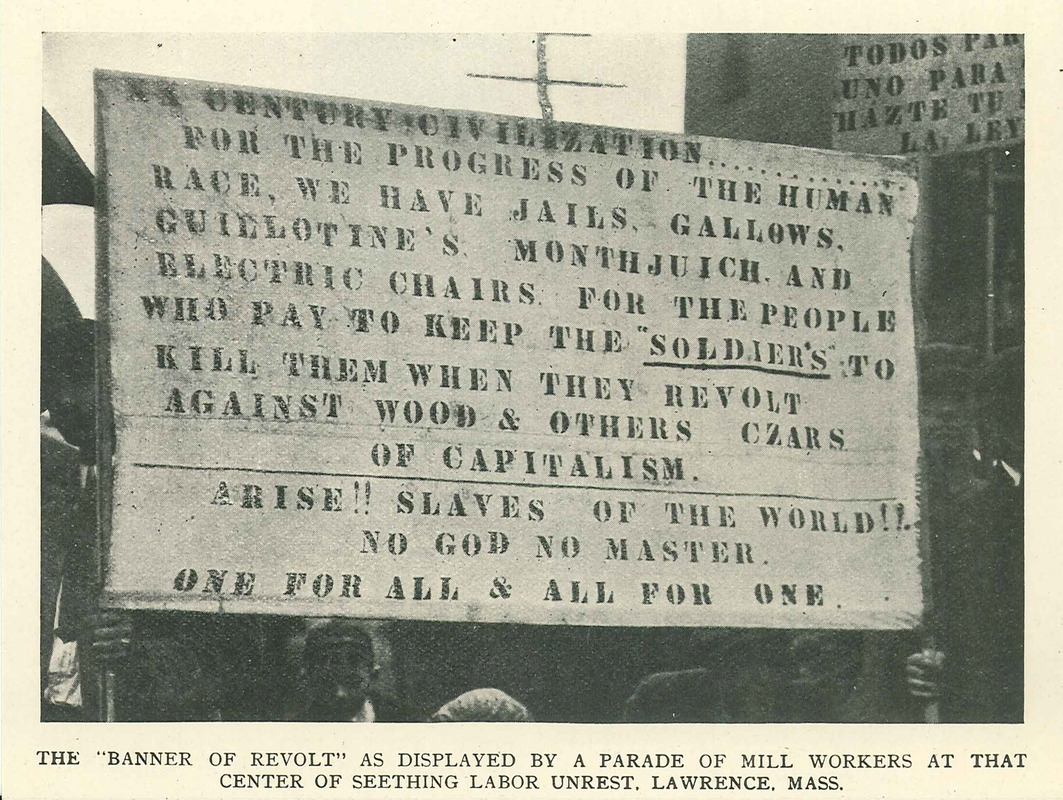

Children of the mill workers were brought to homes of supporters of the Lawrence textile strike. With the aid of Haywood and Flynn, these two individuals organized a way for donations for the children of strikers. In addition, the children began to form strike rallies to demonstrate the hardship and struggle occurring in the Lawrence mill factories. Strikes happened from Vermont all the way to New York City; those children fought to be seen and heard where they went.

The national attention had an effect: the owners offered a 5% pay raise on March 1, but the workers rejected it. American Woolen Company agreed to most of the strikers' demands on March 12, 1912. The strikers had demanded an end to the Premium System in which a portion of their earnings were subject to month-long production and attendance standards. The mill owners' concession was to change the award of the premium from once every four weeks to once every two weeks. The rest of the manufacturers followed by the end of the month; other textile companies throughout New England, anxious to avoid a similar confrontation, then followed suit.

The children who had been taken in by supporters in New York City came home on March 30.

== Aftermath ==
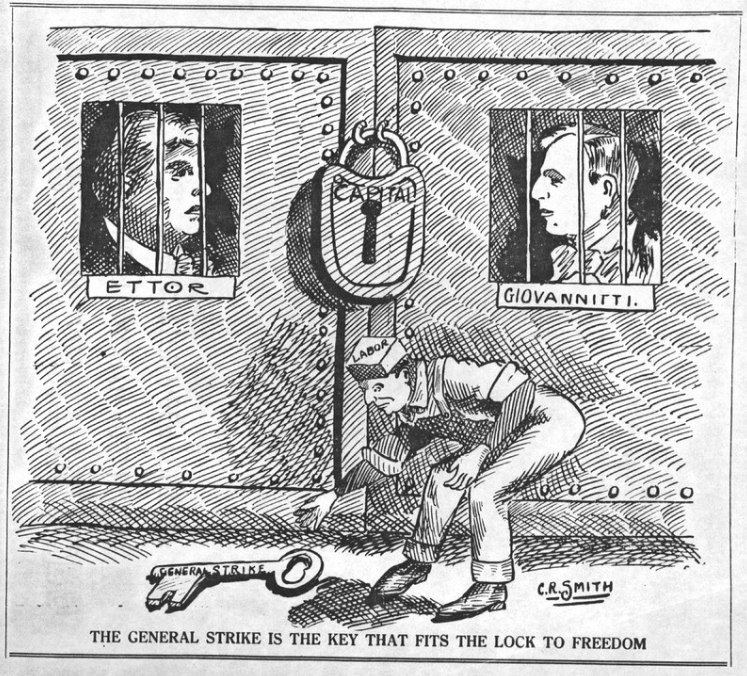
Political cartoon which urges a general strike to free the strike leaders Ettor and Giovannitti.

Ettor and Giovanniti, both members of IWW, remained in prison for months after the strike was over. Haywood threatened a general strike to demand their freedom, with the cry "Open the jail gates or we will close the mill gates." The IWW raised $60,000 for their defense and held demonstrations and mass meetings throughout the country in their support; the Boston authorities arrested all of the members of the Ettor and Giovannitti Defense Committee. On March 10, 1912, an estimated 10,000 protestors gathered in Lawrence demanding the release of Ettor and Giovannitti. Then, 15,000 Lawrence workers went on strike for one day on September 30 to demand the release of Ettor and Giovannitti. Swedish and French workers proposed a boycott of woolen goods from the US and a refusal to load ships going there, and Italian supporters of the Giovannitti men rallied in front of the US consulate in Rome.

In the meantime, Ernest Pitman, a Lawrence building contractor who had done extensive work for the American Woolen Company, confessed to a district attorney that he had attended a meeting in the Boston offices of Lawrence textile companies, where the plan to frame the union by planting dynamite had been made. Pitman committed suicide shortly thereafter when he was subpoenaed to testify. Wood, the American Woolen Company owner, was formally exonerated.

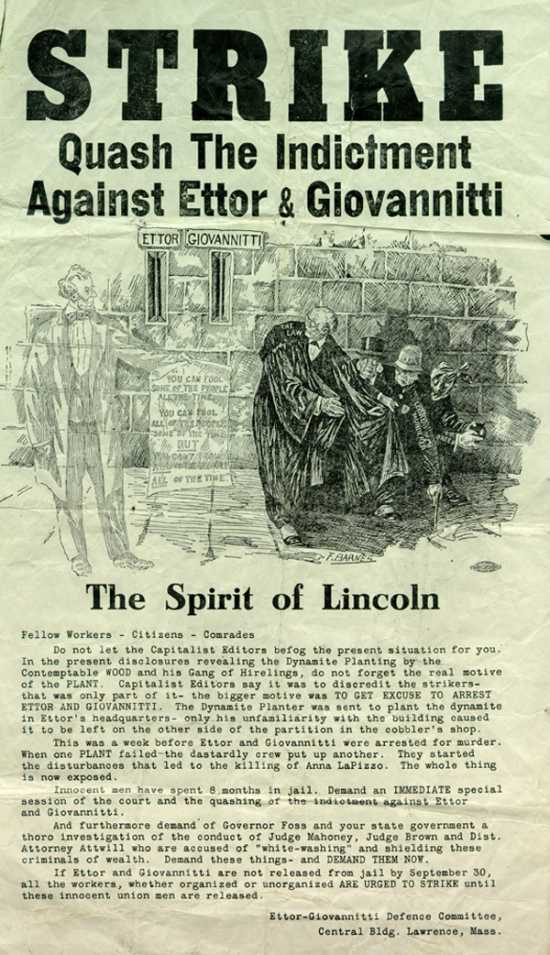
Flyer distributed in Lawrence, Sept. 1912.

When the trial of Ettor and Giovannitti, as well as a third defendant, Giuseppe Caruso, accused of firing the shot that killed the picketer, began in September 1912 in Salem before Judge Joseph F. Quinn, the three defendants were kept in steel cages in the courtroom. All witnesses testified that Ettor and Giovannitti were miles away and that Caruso, the third defendant, was at home and eating supper at the time of the killing.

Ettor and Giovannitti both delivered closing statements at the end of the two-month trial. In Ettor's closing statement, he turned and faced the District Attorney:

Does Mr. Ateill believe for a moment that... the cross or the gallows or the guillotine, the hangman's noose, ever settled an idea? It never did. If an idea can live, it lives because history adjudges it right. And what has been considered an idea constituting a social crime in one age has in the next age become the religion of humanity. Whatever my social views are, they are what they are. They cannot be tried in this courtroom.

All three defendants were acquitted on November 26, 1912.

The strikers, however, lost nearly all of the gains they had won in the next few years. The IWW, disdaining written contracts as encouraging workers to abandon the daily class struggle, thus left the mill owners to chisel away at the improvements in wages and working conditions, to fire union activists, and to install labor spies to keep an eye on workers. The more persistent owners laid off further employees during a depression in the industry.

By then, the IWW had turned its attention to supporting the silk industry workers in Paterson, New Jersey. The Paterson Silk Strike of 1913 was defeated.

== Casualties ==
The strike had at least three casualties:

- Anna LoPizzo, an Italian immigrant, who was shot in the chest during a clash between strikers and police
- John Ramey, a Syrian youth who was bayoneted to death in the back by the militia
- Jonas Smolskas, a Lithuanian immigrant who was beaten to death several months after the strike ended for wearing a pro-labor pin on his lapel

== Conclusion and legacy ==
After the strike concluded, workers received a few of the demands established between mill workers and owners. Some workers went back to work at the mills and "others came and went, trying to find other jobs, failing, returning again to the music of the power loom". Even after the strike was finished, there were many other strikes that occurred in other states involving various mill factories. "On January 12, 1913, the IWW held anniversary celebration in Lawrence" which was one of the last celebrations for a couple of years.

Eugene Debs said of the strike, "The Victory at Lawrence was the most decisive and far-reaching ever won by organized labor." Author Peter Carlson saw this strike conducted by the militant Industrial Workers of the World (IWW) as a turning point. He wrote, "Wary of [a war with the anti-capitalist IWW], some mill owners swallowed their hatred of unions and actually invited the AFL to organize their workers.

On February 9, 2019, Senator Elizabeth Warren officially announced her candidacy for President of the United States at the site of the strike.

== See also ==
- Bread and Roses Heritage Festival in Lawrence
- Carmela Teoli, a teenage mill worker who testified before Congress about being scalped by a machine
- William M. Wood, co-founder of the American Woolen Company
- Ralph Fasanella, an artist who depicted the strike in a series of paintings
- Murder of workers in labor disputes in the United States

== Sources ==
- Cameron, Ardis, Radicals of the Worst Sort: Laboring Women in Lawrence, Massachusetts, 1860–1912 (Urbana: University of Illinois Press, 1993).
- Cole, Donald B. Immigrant City: Lawrence, Massachusetts 1845–1921. Chapel Hill: University of North Carolina Press, 1963.
- Forrant, Robert and Susan Grabski, Lawrence and the 1912 Bread and Roses Strike (Images of America) Arcadia Publishing, 2013.
- Forrant, Robert and Jurg Siegenthaler, "The Great Lawrence Textile Strike of 1912: New Scholarship on the Bread & Roses Strike", Amityville, NY: Baywood Publishing Inc., 2014.
- Watson, Bruce, Bread and Roses: Mills, Migrants, and the Struggle for the American Dream, Penguin Books, 2006.
- Zinn, Howard. A People's History of the United States. Revised Edition. New York: HarperCollins, 2005.
- https://www.celebrategreece.com/links/2185-products/resources/8397-angelo-rocco-the-lawrence-labor-strike-of-1912
