= Arturo Giovannitti =

Italian-American union leader, socialist political activist and poet

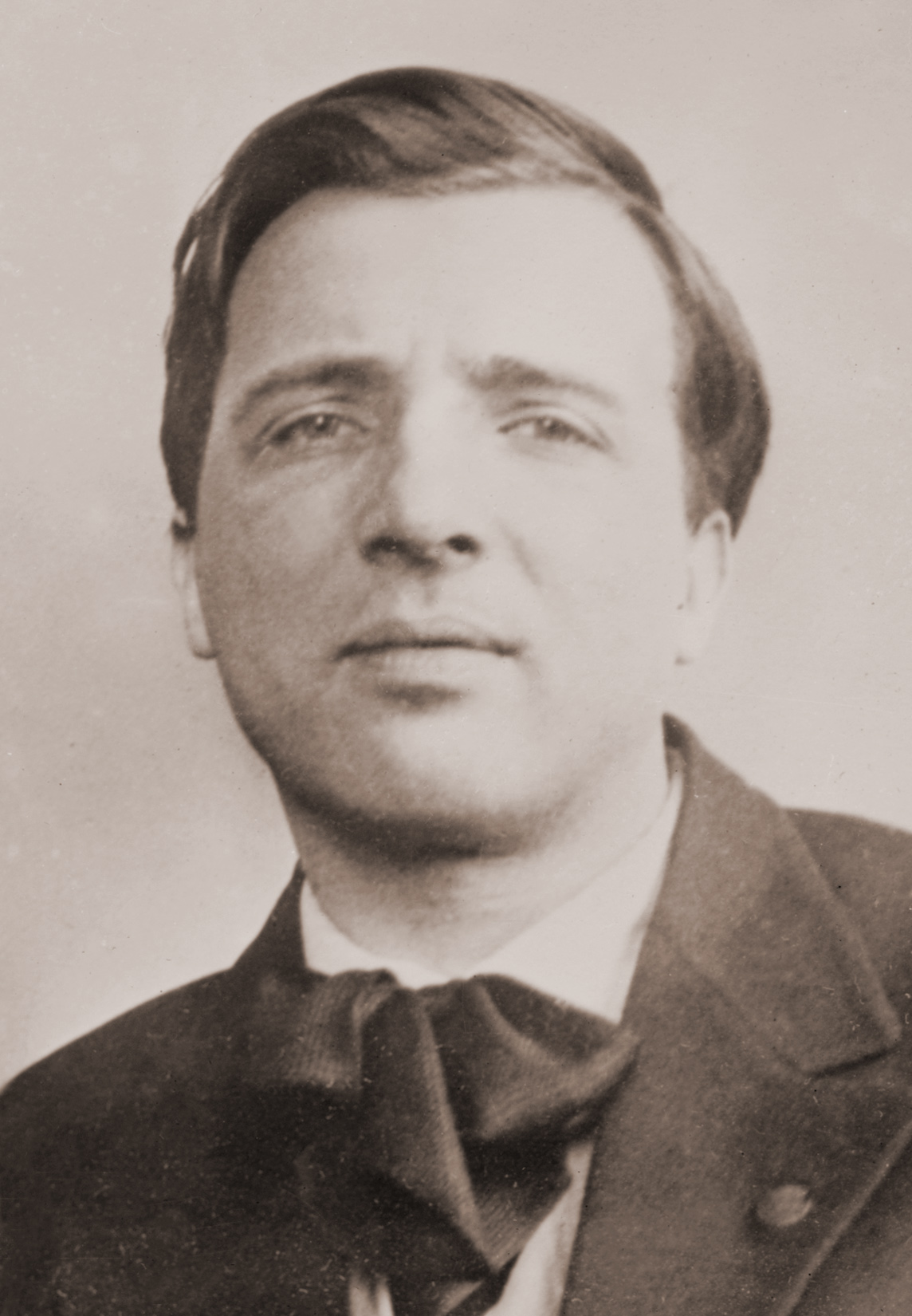
Giovannitti, around his September 1912 trial.

Arturo M. Giovannitti (Italian: [dʒovanˈnitti]; January 7, 1884 – December 31, 1959) was an Italian-American union leader, socialist political activist, and poet. He is best remembered as one of the principal organizers of the 1912 Lawrence textile strike and as a defendant in a celebrated trial caused by that event.

== Early life ==
Arturo Giovannitti was born in 1884 in Ripabottoni, in what is now the Province of Campobasso, Italy, at the time part of the Abruzzi but now part of Molise. He immigrated to Canada in 1900 and, after working in a coal mine and railroad crew, began preaching in a Presbyterian mission. He soon came to the United States, where he studied at Union Theological Seminary. Although he did not graduate, he ran rescue missions for Italians in Brooklyn and Pittsburgh. He also began writing for the weekly newspaper of the Italian Socialist Federation. In 1911, he became the newspaper's editor.

== Political career ==
On January 1, 1912, in accordance with a new state law, the textile mills of Lawrence, Massachusetts, posted new rules limiting the hours of workers to 54 a week, down from the previous 56. It soon became clear that the employers had no intention of adjusting wage rates upwards to make up for the lost work time, and a strike ensued.

On January 12, 1912, the Italian-language branch of the Industrial Workers of the World Local 20 decided to send to New York City for Joe Ettor, the organization's top Italian-language leader, to come to Lawrence and lead the strike. Within a few days, Ettor called his friend Giovannitti to Lawrence to coordinate relief efforts. Giovannitti soon began speaking to Italians. His most noted address was his "Sermon on the Common," which modified Jesus's Beatitudes to decidedly less passive stances, such as "Blessed are the rebels, for they shall reconquer the earth."

On January 29, a striker, Anna LoPizzo, was shot and killed during a police crackdown on an unruly mob. Although Ettor and Giovannitti were three miles from the scene, both were arrested and imprisoned, along with one other striker, on the charge of inciting a riot leading to the loss of life.

While in jail, Giovannitti wrote many poems. By the time of the trial, that fall, several were published in leading journals, bringing him widespread fame. Giovannitti's poem "The Walker", in which he recounted the tormented footsteps of a prisoner, was compared to Walt Whitman and Oscar Wilde.

For not for the Walker, nor for my heart is there a second, a minute, an hour or anything that is in the old clock -- there is nothing but the night, the sleepless night, the watchful, wistful night, and footsteps that go, and footsteps that come and the wild, tumultuous beatings that trail after them forever.

The imprisonment of Ettor and Giovannitti became a cause célèbre, attracting nationwide attention and inspiring activists who called for the guaranteeing of free speech. Workers from across the US contributed to the Ettor-Giovannitti Defense Fund, which eventually totaled $50,000.

The trial of Ettor, Giovannitti, and the co-defendant accused of actually firing the shot that killed the picketer, began on September 30, 1912, in Salem, Massachusetts, before Judge Joseph F. Quinn. As was the custom in capital cases in Massachusetts, the three defendants were kept in an open metal cage in the courtroom. The trial received coverage throughout North America and Europe. Prosecution witnesses quoted from speeches by Ettor and Giovannitti. Ettor: "This town won't be very happy in two days. Something is going to happen... keep the gun shops busy...." Giovannitti (to strikers): "Prowl around like wild animals looking for the blood of the scabs." Yet defense witnesses testified without contradiction that Ettor and Giovannitti were miles away from the scene of the murder while Joseph Caruso, the third defendant in the case, was at home eating supper at the time of the killing.

Giovannitti and Ettor both delivered closing statements at the end of the two-month trial. Giovannitti's speech brought many in the gallery to tears. Though he began by noting it was "the first time in my life that I speak publicly in your wonderful language," he soon spoke eloquently about his love of life:

I am twenty-nine years old. I have a woman that loves me and that I love. I have a mother and father that are waiting for me. I have an ideal that is dearer to me than can be expressed or understood. And life has so many allurements and it is so nice and bright and so wonderful that I feel the passion of living in my heart.

Yet if allowed to go free, he added,

Let me tell you that the first strike that breaks again in this Commonwealth or any other place in America where the work and the help and the intelligence of Joseph J. Ettor and Arturo Giovannitti will be needed and necessary, there we shall go again regardless of any fear and any threat. We shall return again to our humble efforts, obscure, humble, unknown, misunderstood -- soldiers of this mighty army of the working class of the world, which out of the shadows and the darkness of the past is striving towards the destined goal which is the emancipation of human kind, which is the establishment of love and brotherhood and justice for every man and every woman in this earth.

All three defendants were acquitted, on November 26, 1912.

== Subsequent activism ==
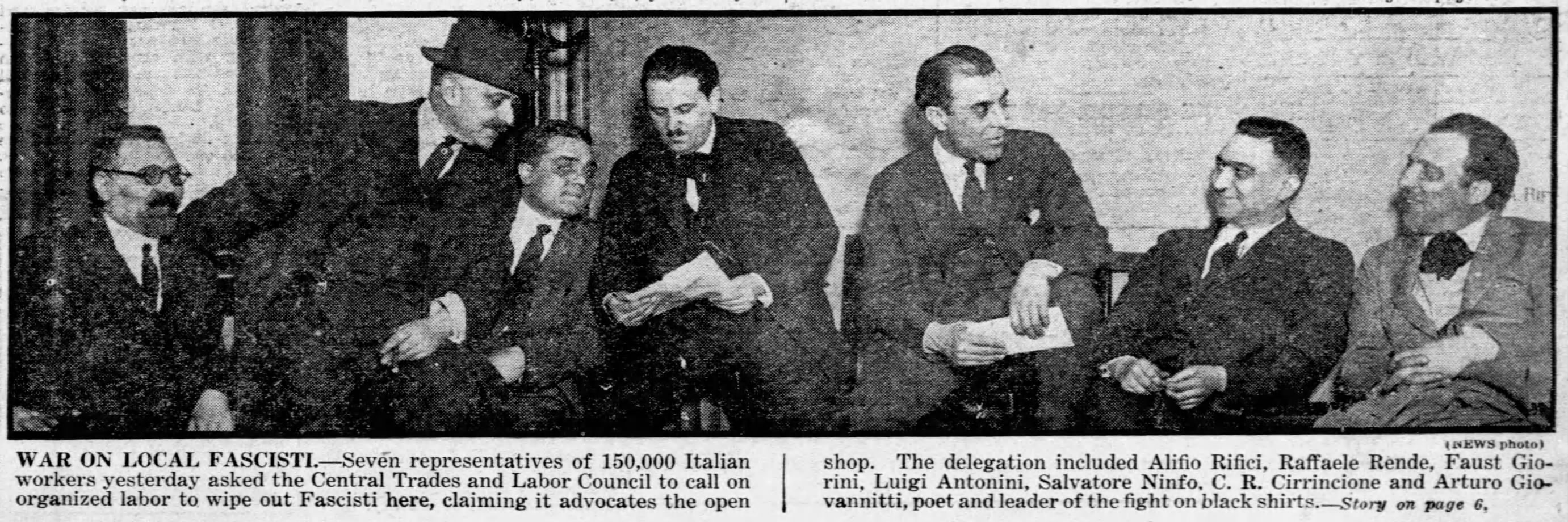
Giovannitti (far left) alongside Luigi Antonini, Salvatore Ninfo, and other anti-fascist Italian labor leaders, 1923

In the wake of the trial, Giovannitti published his first book of poems, Arrows in the Gale, in 1914. In an introduction to the book, Helen Keller wrote: "Giovannitti is, like Shelley, a poet of revolt against the cruelty, the poverty, the ignorance which too many of us accept." But Giovannitti, following ten months in prison, avoided involvement in volatile strikes. Instead, he devoted himself to poetry, editing radical journals and protesting World War I, which claimed two of his brothers.

In 1916, he participated in Percy MacKaye's production of Caliban by the Yellow Sands, translating it into Italian. Throughout the 1920s and 1930s, he appeared at various workers' rallies, charming crowds with his Vandyke beard and flowery Italian and English.

== Death ==
In 1950, Giovannitti was stricken by paralysis in both legs. He remained bedridden until his death in the Bronx, in 1959.

Giovannitti's papers, including a typescript play called The Alpha and the Omega (In Memory of a very Rich Holy Man), are housed at the University of Minnesota.

== Works ==
- Ettor and Giovannitti Before the Jury at Salem, Massachusetts, November 23, 1912. With Joseph J. Ettor. Chicago: Industrial Workers of the World, n.d. [1912].
- Address of the Defendant Arthuro M. Giovannitti to Jury. Salem Court House, November 23, 1912. Boston: Boston School of Social Science, 1912. —reissued with new title, 1913.
- Arrows in the Gale. Introduction by Helen Keller. Riverside, CT: Hillacre Bookhouse, 1914.
- The Cage. Riverside, CT: Hillacre, 1914.
- Come era nel principio (tenebre rosse): Dramma in 3 atti. Brooklyn: Italian IWW Publishing Bureau, 1918.
- "Communism on Trial," in The Red Ruby: Address to the Jury by Benjamin Gitlow. [New York]: Communist Labor Party, n.d. [1920]; pp. 14–15.
- Eugenio V. Debs: Apostolo del socialismo. With Girolamo Valenti. Chicago: Italian Labor Publishing Co., n.d. [c. 1920].
- Parole e sangue. New York: Labor Press, 1938.
- Quando canta il gallo. Chicago, E. Clemente, 1957.
- Collected Poems. Chicago, E. Clemente, 1962.

Translator:

- Émile Pouget, Sabotage. Chicago: Charles H. Kerr & Co., 1913.

== See also ==
- Virgilia D'Andrea
