= Carmela Teoli =

Italian-American labor activist

Carmela Teoli

Carmela Teoli (1897–c. 1970) was an Italian-American mill worker whose testimony before the U.S. Congress in 1912 called national attention to unsafe working conditions in the mills and helped bring a successful end to the "Bread and Roses" strike. Teoli had been scalped by a cotton-twisting machine at the age of 13, requiring several months of hospitalization.

Decades later, a reporter named Paul Cowan revived Teoli's long-forgotten story, generating renewed interest in the history of the strike and prompting discussions on the nature of historical memory.

== Biography ==
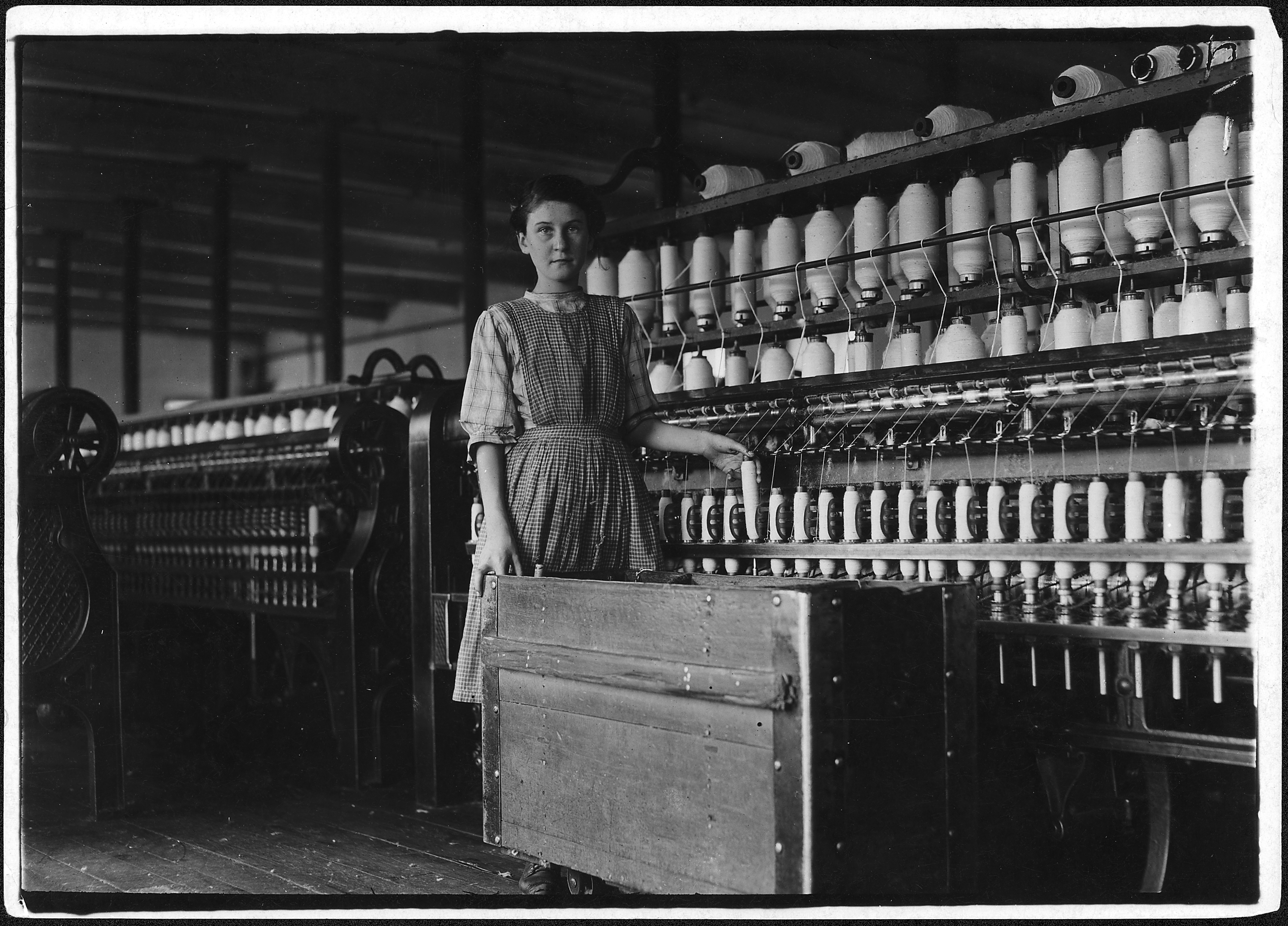
Adrienne Pagnette, a French girl working as a doffer. Winchendon, Massachusetts. Lewis Hine 1911.

Carmela Teoli (also known as Camella Teoli) was born in Rocca d'Evandro, Italy on July 2, 1897 and grew up in Lawrence, Massachusetts. In ''A Place at the Table: Struggles for Equality in America'' by Maria Fleming, Oxford University Press in association with Southern Poverty Law Center (2001), we can read: ''Most of the workers, including Carmela Teoli and her father, were recent immigrants from Europe''. Carmela had one sister and three brothers.

In 1911, when she was 13 years old, a recruiter from the American Woolen Company persuaded her father to let her drop out of school and go to work in the mill. To circumvent child labor laws, the recruiter offered to forge a birth certificate for a bribe of $4, showing that Carmela was 14, old enough to work.

Working conditions in the Lawrence mills were grim: the hours were long, the air was filled with lint, and workers were not paid a living wage. The average life expectancy for mill workers was 39.6; one third of mill workers died before the age of 25.

Teoli went to work as a doffer in the Washington Mill. She had been working for about three weeks when her hair got caught in a machine used to twist cotton into thread, and part of her scalp was torn off. The injury was so severe she had to be hospitalized for seven months. The company paid her medical bills, but did not provide any sick pay. When she returned home in January 1912, the Great Lawrence Textile Strike (also known as the Bread and Roses strike) had just begun. Workers in the Industrial Workers of the World, or "Wobblies", issued a proclamation demanding "the right to live free from slavery and starvation." Teoli joined the strike because, as she explained later, she was not getting enough to eat.

That March, socialist organizer Margaret Sanger arranged for a group of workers to testify before the United States House Committee on Rules, which was investigating the causes of the strike. Significantly, first lady Helen Taft attended the hearing. Several workers addressed the committee: Josephine Lis testified about being charged for a dipper of water at work, and Victoria Winiarczyk told of being shortchanged in her weekly pay; but it was the soft-spoken Carmela Teoli whose testimony made the deepest impression on the committee as she matter-of-factly described what had happened to her. After the hearing, President and Mrs. Taft invited her and the other children from Lawrence to lunch at the White House, and the Tafts donated a thousand dollars to the strike relief fund.

Teoli's story made national headlines. This latest bout of bad publicity put additional pressure on the mill owners to concede to the workers' demands, and a few days later, on March 13, the strike was settled. In addition to the 27,000 Lawrence workers, nearly all textile workers in New England received raises as a result of the strike. According to the Boston Globe, at least 500,000 people had their standard of living raised. A year later, Massachusetts passed the 1913 Child Labor Bill, which mandated shorter hours for children so that they could attend school, and set minimum ages for dangerous jobs.

Teoli went back to work in the mill. She was never promoted, while workers who had not joined the strike were rewarded for their loyalty with better paying jobs.

== Posthumous recognition ==
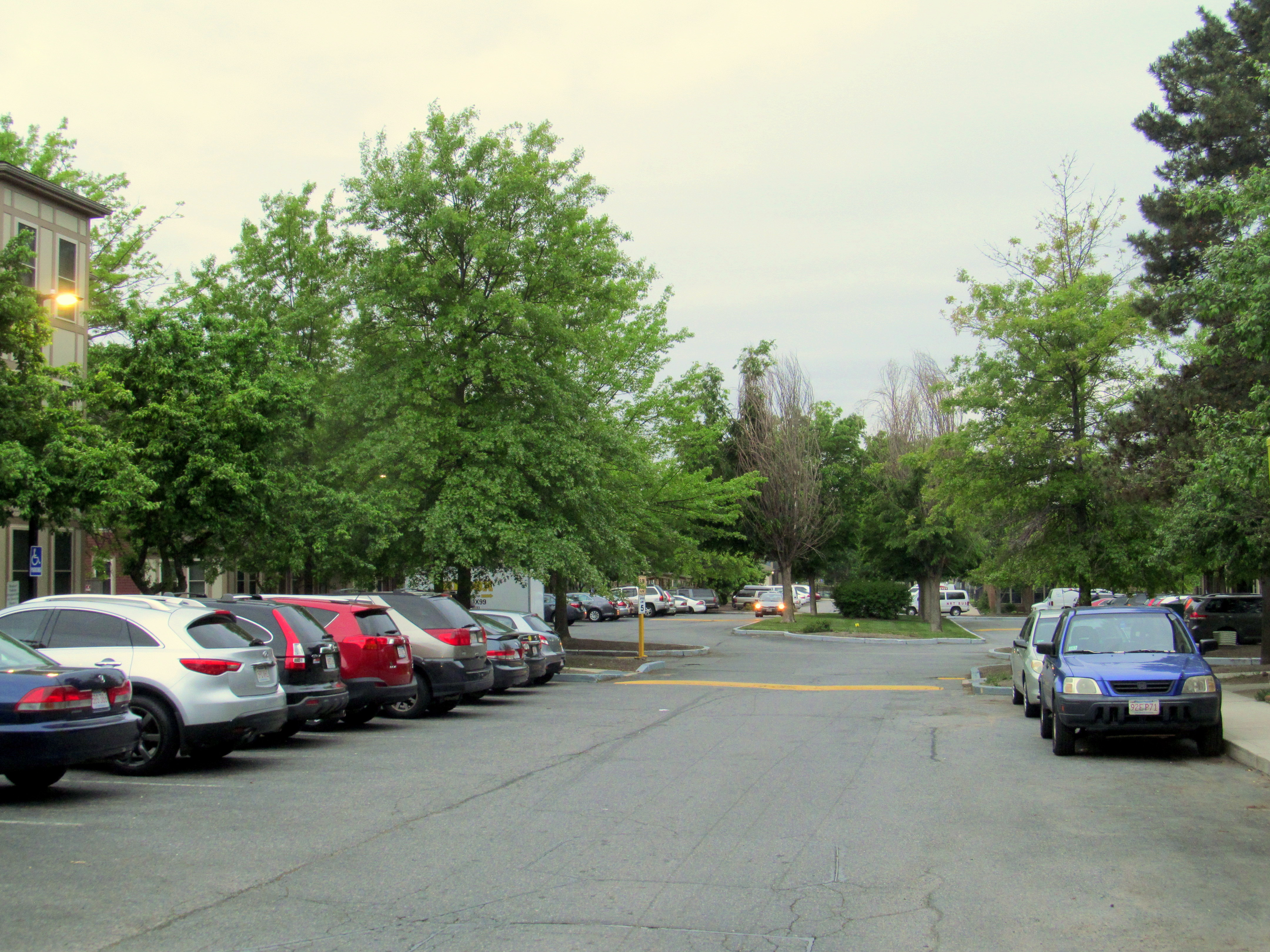
Camella Teoli Way in 2017

In 1976, a Village Voice reporter named Paul Cowan went to Lawrence to research the strike. Hoping to contact Teoli, he learned from her daughter that she had died a few years earlier. The daughter agreed to be interviewed but asked not to be named; Cowan used the pseudonym "Mathilda" for her in his article. For years, Mathilda had helped her mother arrange her hair in a bun to cover up a six-inch bald spot. When Cowan asked her about the strike, he was surprised to find that she knew nothing about her mother's role in it:

But Mathilda knew nothing at all about Camella Teoli's political past—nothing about her trip to Washington, nothing about Mrs. Taft's presence, nothing about the sensational impact her mother had made on America's conscience. Neither, it turned out, did her brother. The subject had never been mentioned in her home.

Cowan's front-page article in the Village Voice in 1979 helped spark renewed interest in the strike among Lawrence residents, many of whom had been hesitant to discuss it. Since 1986, the city of Lawrence has held an annual Bread and Roses Heritage Festival on Labor Day to commemorate the strike. The story of Teoli and the city's "amnesia" has also inspired discussion and writings on the subject of historical memory.

Camella Teoli Way in downtown Lawrence is named in Teoli's honor. Her grandson, Frank Palumbo, Jr., self-published a book about her titled Through Carmela's Eyes in 2011.

== See also ==
- Anna LoPizzo, a Lawrence striker killed during a confrontation with police
