= Joseph F. Quinn =

American judge (1857–1929)

Joseph Francis Quinn (1857–1929) was the first Irish American to become a judge in Massachusetts for any significant period of time. He served on the bench of the Essex County Superior Court after being appointed by Governor Eugene Foss in 1911 until his death in 1929. He lived in Salem and was the son of an immigrant from the days of the Great Famine. He attended the University of Ottawa in Canada due to discrimination against the Irish in the U.S. at the time, graduating in 1881, and went on to be admitted to the bar in Massachusetts in 1884 after attending Boston University School of Law and apprenticing under a local attorney. After working for the local U.S. Attorney, Joseph Quinn started his own thriving practice.

Joseph Quinn was associated with John F. Fitzgerald and Patrick Kennedy (P. J. Kennedy) and other prominent local persons in the greater Boston area. Judge Quinn presided over many prominent cases including the trial of Joseph Ettor and other leaders of the storied "Bread & Roses" Lawrence textile strike in 1912 which became a national cause célèbre and resulted in the defendants' acquittal. While his handling of this historic case was praised, there were many within the radical labor milieu supporting the defendants who believed he, like many in positions of authority at the time, harbored a deep seated conservative bias against them.

The next year Joseph Quinn was the judge in the widely publicized trial of William Dorr of Stockton, California, who was convicted and sentenced to death for having traveled all the way back East to Lynn, Massachusetts in order to murder millionaire George Marsh as part of a scheme to inherit his money through an unwitting California niece. Dorr was executed in the electric chair in 1914.
