= Anna LoPizzo =

Italian immigrant striker killed during the Lawrence Textile Strike

Photo, Memorial Day 1912, Lawrence, Massachusetts, at the grave of Anna LoPizzo in Lawrence's Immaculate Conception Cemetery.

Anna LoPizzo was an Italian immigrant worker killed during the Lawrence Textile Strike (also known as the Bread and Roses Strike). Her death was significant to both sides in the struggle. Bruce Watson wrote in his epic Bread and Roses: Mills, Migrants, and the Struggle for the American Dream, "If America had a Tomb of the Unknown Immigrant paying tribute to the millions of immigrants known only to God and distant cousins compiling family trees, Anna LoPizzo would be a prime candidate to lie in it."

== Life ==
LoPizzo, born in Buccheri (Italy SR) 26 November 1878 (Documentation validate) maybe changed her name in Anna LaMonica, lived on Common Street in Lawrence, Massachusetts.

== Death ==
On January 29, 1912, officer Oscar Benoit fired on a group of striking workers, hitting and killing LoPizzo. This was affirmed by nineteen witnesses.

In the book Roughneck, Peter Carlson writes:

At the barricades, pickets and police began to push and shove each other. The police advanced, packing the retreating marchers so tight that they could no longer move, and then began clubbing. Some strikers fought back. A policeman received a stab wound. A police sergeant ordered his men to draw their weapons and fire.

The IWW offered its own account a year after the strike, based upon trial proceedings:

[On] January 29, a striker, Annie LoPizzo, was killed on the corner of Union and Garden Streets, during police and military interference with lawful picketing. She was shot by a bullet said to have been fired by Police Officer Oscar Benoit, though Benoit and Police Officer Marshall claim it was fired from behind Benoit by a personal enemy of the latter, following an altercation.

== The charges and the trial ==
The death of Anna LoPizzo was used by the authorities during the Lawrence Strike as a means of disrupting and pressuring the union.

Joseph Ettor and Arturo Giovannitti, both IWW organizers, were arrested for the murder although they were two miles away at the time of her death. Police claimed that they had been "inciting and procuring the commission of the crime in [pursuit] of an unlawful conspiracy", thus making them "accessories before the fact". The two men were imprisoned without bail until trial. A third man, Joseph Caruso, was later arrested for the murder. However:

Three witnesses—his landlord, his child's god-father and his wife—helped Caruso to establish a complete alibi; he was at home eating supper when Annie Lo Pizzo was alleged to have been shot by him... Caruso said he was not a member of the I.W.W., but would join as soon as he got out [of the jail].

Bill Haywood returned to Lawrence to take control of the strike effort.

The trial of Caruso, Ettor and Giovannitti was held on September 30, keeping the two organizers out of action for eight months. At trial, Ettor and Giovannitti were locked in metal cages. The district attorney referred to them as "social vultures" and "labor buzzards". Yet they were not accused of the murder for which they were arrested. All three were acquitted.

== Significance of Anna LoPizzo's death ==
Anna LoPizzo's death on the picket line gave authorities a chance to remove the two main organizers from action for the duration of the strike, but it also became a rallying cry for the workers to demand justice. A few days after LoPizzo's death, "a group of enraged Italian women happened upon a lone police officer on an icy bridge. After stripping him of his gun, club and badge, they sliced the officer's suspenders and took off his pants--a humiliation technique popular with the disorderly women of Lawrence--and dangled the officer over the freezing river".

In another protest following LoPizzo's death, "a 22-year-old Syrian immigrant named Annie Kiami stepped in front of the crowd," called the police "Cossacks," and "wrapped an American flag around her body and dared them to shoot holes in [it]". The protesting women quickly gained a reputation as radicals.

The Lawrence strike was ultimately successful because the workers stayed united in their demands. Business writers began to question employers' and the local authorities' tactics relating not only to the strike, but specifically relating to the handling of Anna LoPizzo's death. One writer concerned about the success of the IWW's organizing tactics was Arno Dosch, who wrote in the magazine The World's Work:

The efforts that have been made by employers and by governmental authorities to repress the movement have been worse than useless. Every move that has been made against the I. W. W. has had the effect of winning sympathy... The trial of the three agitators, Mr. Ettor, Mr. Giovannitti, and Mr. Caruso, for the murder of a woman whose death was indirectly due to the strike, was a tactical error. Mr. Ettor won the support of millions of people when he said, "I have been tried here not for my acts, but for my views."

Before the Lawrence Strike and the trial for the death of Anna LoPizzo, many businessmen categorically refused to recognize any unions. After the strike, the American Federation of Labor was courted by some employers, if only as a bulwark against the radical and militant Industrial Workers of the World.

The foreboding on the part of employers resulted from their fears about what this new labor organization, the IWW, actually represented. Thompson quoted Harry Fosdick in the June issue of Outlook in 1912 as saying "Wages have been raised, work has been resumed, the militia has gone, and the whirring looms suggest industrial peace; but behind all this the most revolutionary organization in the history of American industry is building up an army of volunteers. The I.W.W. leaves behind as hopelessly passé, the methods of the American Federation of Labor.

Some believed that the success of the strikers called for other measures. Fosdick quoted a Boston lawyer who stated, "The strike should have been stopped in the first twenty-four hours. The militia should have been instructed to shoot. That is the way Napoleon did it".

== Commemoration ==
In 2000 a headstone was finally placed at LoPizzo's grave in Immaculate Conception Cemetery. It was carved with the Bread and Roses symbol of grain stalks and a rose. After being displayed at Lawrence Heritage State Park as part of the annual Bread and Roses festival, it was placed on her grave on September 14.

== See also ==
- Anti-union violence
- Lawrence Textile Strike
- Industrial Workers of the World
- Big Bill Haywood
- Bread and Roses
- Murder of workers in labor disputes in the United States
