= Bruce Watson (writer) =

American writer

- Born: Bruce Edward Watson; August 17, 1953 (age 73); Peoria, Illinois
- Occupation: Writer
- Writing career
- Genre: Nonfiction
- Subjects: American culture and history
- Website: www.theattic.space

Bruce Edward Watson (born August 17, 1953) is an American writer who specializes in American culture and history. He has written six books as well as feature articles, humorous essays, and book reviews for Smithsonian Magazine, American Heritage, and other publications. Watson publishes a blog called The Attic that highlights true stories "for a kinder, cooler America."

== Biography ==
Watson was born on August 17, 1953, in Peoria, Illinois, and grew up in Orange County, California. He studied creative writing at Pomona College from 1971 to 1973. He received a B.A. in journalism in 1976 from the University of California, Berkeley, an elementary education credential from California State University San Francisco in 1981, a M.Ed. in elementary education, specializing in math, science, and instructional technology from the University of Massachusetts Amherst in 1990, and a M.A. in American history from the University of Massachusetts Amherst in 1995. He has taught at Deerfield Academy, the University of Massachusetts Amherst, Bard College, and Hampshire College.

Since January 20, 2017, Watson has published a blog, The Attic. Watson conceived the site as a non-political response to the intensely partisan politics. “I was tired of all the anger,” he said. “It seemed like it was driving so much of the coverage and content in magazines and newspapers. At the same time, it felt like something was really being lost with our history. You have to know your country, know the past to move past all the anger.”

Watson received The Bread and Roses Hall of Fame award in 2017.

== Works ==
Title	Publisher	Date of Publication	Notes
The Man Who Changed How Boys and Toys Were Made	Viking	2002	
Bread and Roses: Mills, Migrants, and The Struggle for the American Dream	Viking	2005	New York Public Library's 25 Books to Remember in 2005.
Sacco and Vanzetti: The Men, The Murders, and The Judgment of Mankind	Viking	2007	Mystery Writers of America Edgar Award nominee, True Fact/Crime category The Washington Post, Top 10 Books of the Year
Freedom Summer: The Savage Season That Made Mississippi Burn and Made America a Democracy	Viking	2010	The San Francisco Chronicle Top 100 Books of the Year
Jon Stewart: Beyond the Moments of Zen	New World City	2012	
Stephen Colbert: Beyond Truthiness	New World City	2014	
Light: A Radiant History from Creation to the Quantum Age	Bloomsbury	2016	Los Angeles Times Book Prize nominee
Hearth and Soul: A History of the Jones Library at One Hundred	Levellers Press	2019	
