= Are They Going to Hang My Papa? =

"Are They Going To Hang My Papa?"

Song
- Written: 1907
- Published: 1907
- Songwriter(s): Owen Spendthrift

"Are They Going To Hang My Papa?" is a labor song in support of Bill Haywood, Charles Moyer and George Pettibone, then on trial for the murder of Frank Steunenberg. It is written from the viewpoint of Haywood's daughter, "little Henrietta". The miners were acquitted.

The author, "Owen Spendthrift", is usually thought to be a pseudonym, but the name is also found as the author of the words to a Scott Joplin song, "When Your Hair is Like the Snow", also written in 1907.
