= Bill Haywood =

American labor organizer (1869–1928)

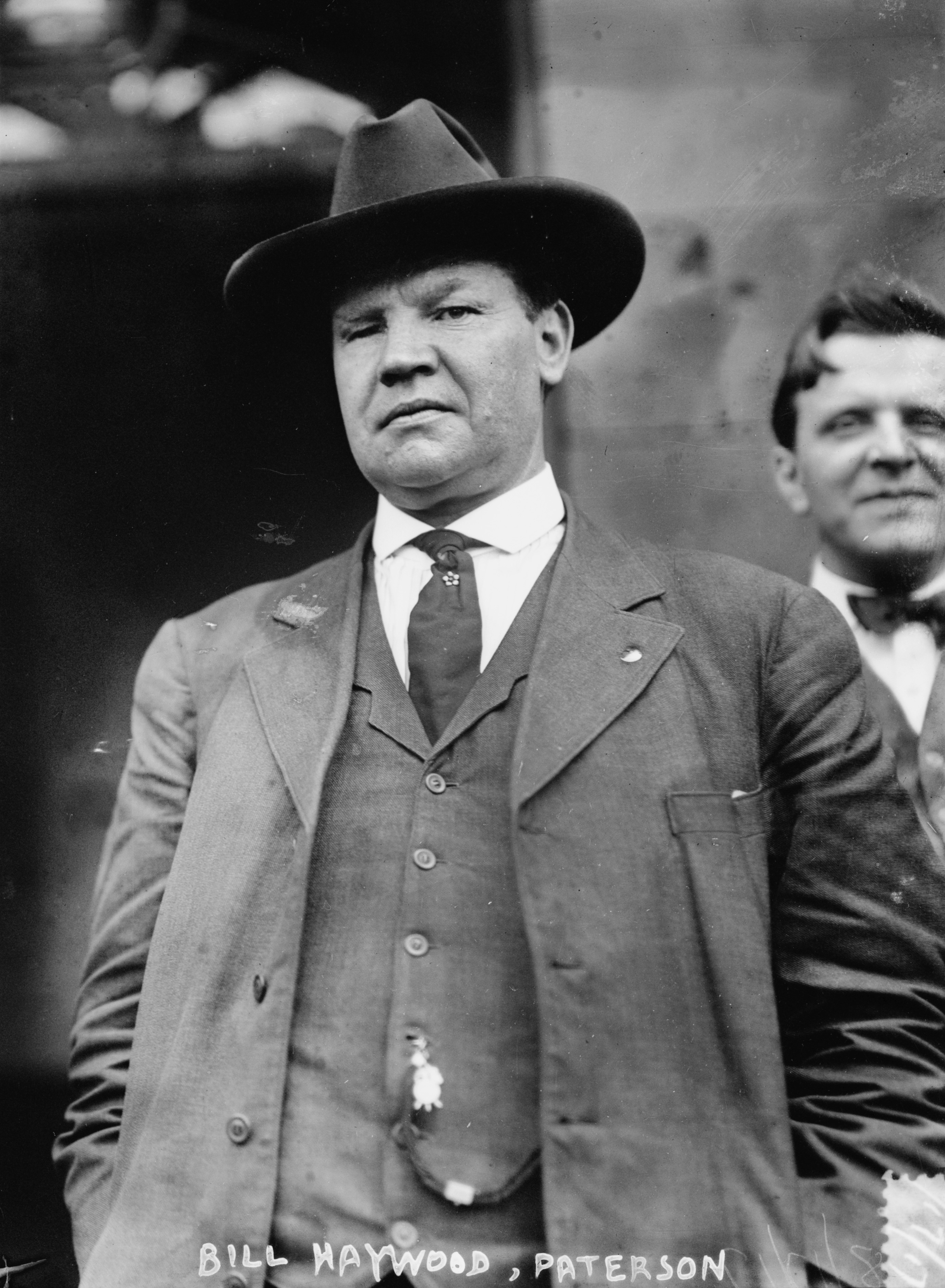
- Haywood c. 1913

3rd and 5th General Secretary-Treasurer of the Industrial Workers of the World
- In office February 1918 – December 1918
- Preceded by: Fred Hardy (acting)
- Succeeded by: Peter Stone
- In office January 1915 – September 1917
- Preceded by: Vincent St. John
- Succeeded by: Fred Hardy (acting)

Personal details
- Born: William Richard Haywood; February 4, 1869 Salt Lake City, Utah Territory, U.S.
- Died: May 18, 1928 (aged 59) Moscow, Soviet Union
- Resting place: Kremlin Wall Necropolis
- Party: Socialist (until 1913); Communist (from 1920)
- Spouse: Nevada Jane Minor (m. 1889; died 1920)
- Children: 2
- Occupation: Labor leader and activist
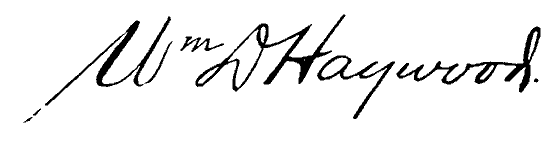
- Signature

William Dudley Haywood (February 4, 1869 – May 18, 1928), nicknamed "Big Bill", was an American labor organizer and founding member and leader of the Industrial Workers of the World (IWW) and a member of the executive committee of the Socialist Party of America. During the first two decades of the 20th century, Haywood was involved in several important labor battles, including the Colorado Labor Wars, the Lawrence Textile Strike, and other textile strikes in Massachusetts and New Jersey.

Haywood was an advocate of industrial unionism, and syndicalism, a labor philosophy that favors organizing all workers in an industry under one union, regardless of the specific trade or skill level; this was in contrast to the craft unions that were prevalent at the time, such as the AFL. He believed that workers of all ethnicities should be united, and favored direct action over political action.

Haywood was often targeted by prosecutors due to his alleged support for property violence. An attempt to prosecute him in 1907 for his alleged involvement in the murder of Frank Steunenberg failed, but in 1918 he was one of 101 IWW members jailed during the First Red Scare. He was sentenced to twenty years. In 1921, while out of prison during an appeal of his conviction, Haywood fled to the Soviet Union, where he spent the remaining years of his life and where he died in 1928. Paul Freeman, John Reed, Charles Ruthenberg, William Z. Foster and Haywood are the only five Westerners to be buried at the Kremlin Wall Necropolis.

== Biography ==
=== Early life ===
Haywood was born in 1869 in Salt Lake City, Utah Territory. His father, a former Pony Express rider, died of pneumonia when Haywood was three years old. His mother, Elizabeth, was an Episcopalian.

At age nine, Haywood injured his right eye while whittling a slingshot with a knife, permanently blinding that eye. He never had his damaged eye replaced with a glass eye; when photographed, he would turn his head to show his left profile. After his uncle Richard arranged for Haywood to work as an indentured laborer on a farm, a job Haywood disliked, he changed his name from William Richard to William Dudley after his father. At age 15, with very little formal education, Haywood began working in the mines. After brief stints as a cowboy and a homesteader, he returned to mining in 1896. High-profile events such as the Haymarket Massacre in 1886 and the Pullman Strike in 1894 fostered Haywood's interest in the labor movement.

=== Western Federation of Miners involvement ===
In 1896, Ed Boyce, president of the Western Federation of Miners (WFM), spoke at the Idaho silver mine where Haywood was working. Inspired by his speech, Haywood signed up as a WFM member, thus formally beginning his involvement in America's labor movement. He immediately became active in the WFM, and by 1900 he had become a member of the union's General Executive Board. In 1902, he became secretary-treasurer of the WFM, the number two position after President Charles Moyer.

The following year, the WFM became involved in the Colorado Labor Wars, a struggle centered in the Cripple Creek mining district in 1903 and 1904, and took the lives of 33 union and non-union workers. The WFM initiated a series of strikes designed to extend the benefits of the union to other workers. The defeat of these strikes led to Haywood's belief in "One Big Union" organized along industrial lines to bring broader working class support for labor struggles.

=== Foundation of the Industrial Workers of the World ===
Late in 1904, several prominent labor radicals met in Chicago to lay down plans for a new revolutionary union. A manifesto was written and sent around the country. Unionists who agreed with the manifesto were invited to attend a convention to found the new union which was to become the Industrial Workers of the World (IWW).

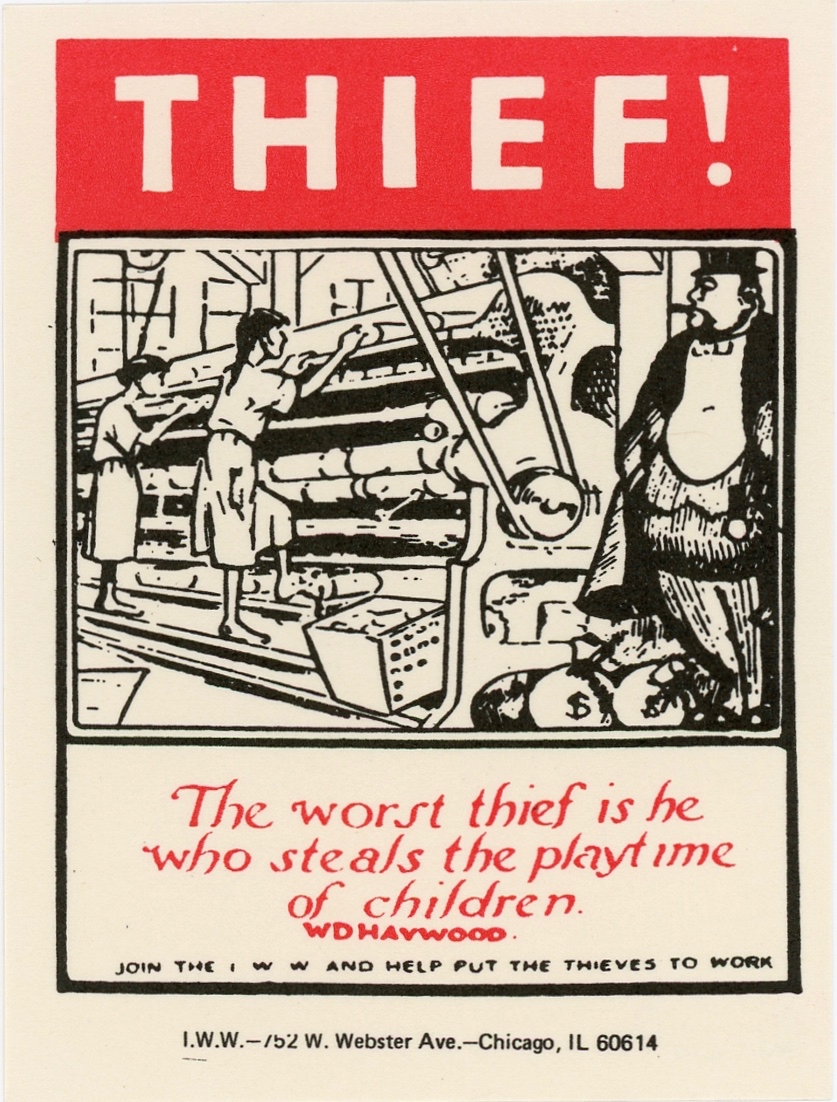
Industrial Workers of the World stickerette "Thief!"

At 10 a.m. on June 27, 1905, Haywood addressed the crowd assembled at Brand's Hall in Chicago. In the audience were two hundred delegates from organizations all over the country representing socialists, anarchists, miners, industrial unionists and rebel workers. Haywood opened the IWW's first convention with the following speech:

Fellow Workers, this is the Continental Congress of the working-class. We are here to confederate the workers of this country into a working-class movement that shall have for its purpose the emancipation of the working-class from the slave bondage of capitalism. The aims and objects of this organization shall be to put the working-class in possession of the economic power, the means of life, in control of the machinery of production and distribution, without regard to capitalist masters.

Other speakers at the convention included Eugene Debs, leader of the Socialist Party of America; Mary Harris "Mother" Jones, an organizer for the United Mine Workers of America; and Lucy Parsons, a major labor organizer whose husband was hanged in relation to the Haymarket affair. After its foundation, the IWW would become aggressively involved in the labor movement.

=== Murder trial ===
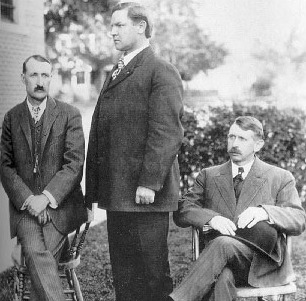
1907 photo of defendants Charles Moyer, Bill Haywood, and George Pettibone

On December 30, 1905, Frank Steunenberg was killed by an explosion in front of his house in Caldwell, Idaho. A former governor of Idaho, Steunenberg had clashed with the WFM in previous strikes. Harry Orchard, a former WFM member who had once acted as WFM President Charles Moyer's bodyguard was arrested for the crime, and evidence was found in his hotel room. Famed Pinkerton detective James McParland, who had infiltrated and helped to destroy the Molly Maguires, was placed in charge of the investigation.

Before the trial, McParland ordered that Orchard be placed on death row in the Boise penitentiary, with restricted food rations and under constant surveillance. After McParland had prepared his investigation, he met with Orchard over a "sumptuous lunch" followed by cigars. The detective reportedly told Orchard that he could escape hanging only if he implicated the leaders of the WFM. In addition to using the threat of hanging, McParland promised food, cigars, better treatment, possible freedom, and even a possible financial reward if Orchard cooperated. The detective obtained a 64-page confession from Orchard in which the suspect took responsibility for a string of crimes and at least seventeen murders.

=== Extradition ===
Of the four men named by Orchard as having a part in Steunenberg's murder, Jack Simpkins had fled, and the other three were known to be in Denver, Colorado. The prosecution feared that if they knew that Orchard was cooperating with the prosecution, the other three would also flee. At McParland's urging, the three were arrested in Denver on February 17, 1906.

Although none of the three had set foot in Idaho while Orchard was stalking Steunenberg and planning his murder, under Idaho law, conspirators were considered to be legally present at the scene of the crime. Using this provision, the local county prosecutor in Idaho drew up extradition papers for Haywood, Moyer, and George Pettibone, which falsely alleged that they had been physically present in Idaho at the time of the murder.

McParland arrived in Denver on Thursday, February 15, and presented the extradition papers to Colorado Governor Jesse Fuller McDonald, who, by prior arrangement with Idaho Governor Frank R. Gooding, accepted them immediately. McParland had planned the arrests for early Sunday morning, when a special train would be ready to take the prisoners to Idaho. The prosecution plans were upset when Moyer went to the Denver train station on Saturday evening carrying a satchel, evidently to leave town. The police arrested him before he could board a train. Moyer's arrest caused the police to move up the arrests of Haywood and Pettibone. The train would not be ready until Sunday morning and so the prisoners were taken to the Denver city jail, but were forbidden from communicating to lawyers or families. Since reporters began nosing around the jail anyway, the prisoners were secretly taken to the Oxford Hotel, near the train station, where they were again held incommunicado. On Sunday morning, the three men were put on the special train, guarded by Colorado militia, which sped out of Denver through Wyoming, and by nightfall they were in Idaho. To thwart any attempts to free the prisoners, the train sped through the principal towns, and stopped for water and to change engines and crew only at out-of-the-way stations.

Trade union members regarded the incident as a kidnapping that occurred to extradite them to Idaho before the courts in Denver could intervene. The extradition was so extraordinary that the president of the AFL, Samuel Gompers, directed his union to raise funds for the defense. However, the United States Supreme Court denied a habeas corpus appeal, ruling that the arrest and extradition were legal, with only Justice Joseph McKenna dissenting.

While in jail in Idaho, Haywood was put forth by the Socialist Party of Colorado as their candidate in the 1906 Colorado gubernatorial election. He finished with over 16,000 votes, just under eight percent.

=== Trial ===
Haywood's trial in Boise began on May 9, 1907, with famed Chicago defense attorney Clarence Darrow defending him. The government had only the testimony of Orchard, the confessed bomber, to implicate Haywood and the other defendants, and Orchard's checkered past and admitted violent history were skillfully exploited by Darrow during the trial, though he did not lead Orchard's cross-examination. During the trial, Orchard admitted that he had acted as a paid informant of the Mine Owners' Association, in effect working for both sides. He also admitted to accepting money from Pinkerton detectives, and had caused explosions during mining disputes before he had met Moyer or Haywood.

After Darrow's final summation, the jury retired on July 28, 1907. After deliberating nine hours, the jury returned on July 29 and acquitted Haywood. During the subsequent trial of Pettibone, Darrow conducted a powerful cross-examination against Orchard before falling ill and withdrawing from the trial, leaving Orrin N. Hilton of Denver to head the defense. After a second jury acquitted Pettibone, the charges against Moyer were dropped.

Despite his radical views, Haywood emerged from the trial with a national reputation. Eugene Debs called him "the Lincoln of Labor." Along with his colorful background and appearance, Haywood was known for his blunt statements about capitalism. "The capitalist has no heart," he often said, "but harpoon him in the pocketbook and you will draw blood." Another time, he began a speech by noting, "Tonight I am going to speak on the class struggle and I am going to make it so plain that even a lawyer can understand it." Yet Haywood also had a flair for dangerous hyperbole that, when quoted in newspapers, was used to justify wholesale arrests of IWW strikers. "Confiscate! That's good!" he often said. "I like that word. It suggests stripping the capitalist, taking something away from him. But there has got to be a good deal of force to this thing of taking."

When the WFM withdrew from the IWW in 1907, Haywood remained a member of both organizations. His murder trial had made Haywood a celebrity, and he was in demand as a speaker for the WFM. But his increasingly radical speeches became more at odds with the WFM, and in April 1908, the union announced that they had ended Haywood's role as a WFM representative. Haywood left the WFM and devoted all his time to organizing for the IWW.

=== Lawrence Textile Strike ===
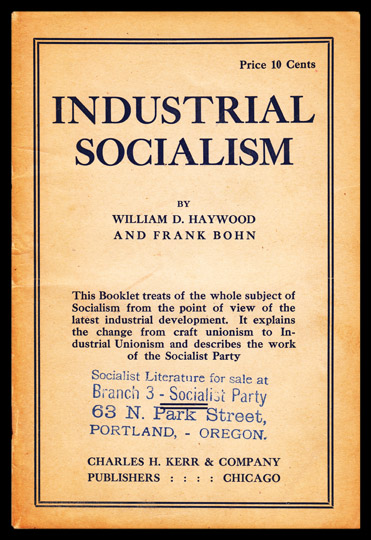
Haywood was the co-author of a popular exposition of the principles of industrial unionism published by Charles H. Kerr & Co. in 1911.

Haywood had left the WFM by the time the Lawrence Textile Strike garnered national attention. On January 11, 1912, textile mill workers in Lawrence, Massachusetts, left their jobs in protest of lowered wages. Within a week, twenty thousand workers were on strike. Authorities responded by calling out police, and the strike quickly escalated into violence. Local IWW leaders Joseph Ettor and Arturo Giovannitti were jailed on charges of murdering Anna LoPizzo, a striker whom nineteen witnesses later said was killed by police gunfire, and martial law was declared. In response, Haywood and other organizers arrived to take charge of the strike.

Over the next several weeks, Haywood personally masterminded or approved many of the strike's tactical innovations. Chief among these was his decision to send strikers' hungry children to sympathetic families in New York, New Hampshire, and Vermont. After hearing from immigrants how European strikers had used this tactic during prolonged strikes, Haywood decided to take the gamble in Lawrence, a first in American labor history. He and the IWW used announcements in socialist newspapers to solicit host families, then screened strikers to see who might be willing to send their children into the care of strangers. On February 10, 1912, the first group of "Lawrence Strike Children" bid tearful goodbyes to their parents and, with chaperones to guide them, boarded a train for New York. The children arrived safely in New York that evening where they were taken to a meeting hall. They were soon lavished with food and clothes and would stay in New York another seven weeks. Despite their excellent treatment, officials in Lawrence and elsewhere were shocked by the move. "I could scarcely believe that the strike leaders would do such a thing as this," Lawrence mayor Michael Scanlon said. "Lawrence could have very easily cared for these children."

On February 24, when strikers attempted to send still more children away, police were ready. During a melée, women and children were forcibly separated, police lashed out with clubs, and dozens of strikers and their children were jailed. National outrage resulted. The New York World wrote, "The Lawrence authorities must be blind and the mill owners mad." The New York Tribune called the police response "as chuckle-headed an exhibition of incompetence to deal with a strike situation as it is possible to recall". The incident led to a congressional hearing and the attention of President William Howard Taft. Nationwide publicity pressured the mill owners into cooperating with the strikers; on March 12, the owners agreed to all the demands of the strikers, officially ending the strike.

However, Haywood and the IWW were not yet finished in Lawrence; despite the success of the strike, Ettor and Giovannitti remained in prison. Haywood threatened the authorities with another strike, saying, "Open the jail gates or we will close the mill gates." Legal efforts and a one-day strike on September 30 did not prompt the authorities to drop the charges. Haywood was indicted in Lawrence for misuse of strike funds, a move that kept him from returning to the city and eventually led to his arrest on the Boston Common. However, on November 26, Ettor and Giovannitti were acquitted, and upon their release were treated to a massive demonstration of public support.

=== Socialist Party of America involvement ===
For many years, Haywood was an active member of the Socialist Party of America. Haywood had always been largely Marxist in his political views, and campaigned for Debs during the 1908 presidential election, traveling by train with Debs around the country. Haywood also represented the Socialist Party as a delegate to the 1910 congress of the Second International, an organization working towards international socialism. In 1912, he was elected to the Socialist Party National Executive Committee.

However, the aggressive tactics of Haywood and the IWW, along with their call for abolition of the wage system and the overthrow of capitalism, created tension with moderate, electorally-oriented leaders of the Socialist Party. Haywood and the IWW focused on direct action and strikes, which often led to violence, and were less concerned with political tactics. When Haywood was quoted speaking at public meetings in New York City to the effect that he had never advocated the use of the ballot by the workers but had instead favored the tactics of direct action, an initiative recalling Haywood from the NEC was launched by the State Executive Committee of the Socialist Party of New York. In February 1913 the recall of Haywood was approved by a margin of more than 2-to-1. Following his defeat, Haywood left the ranks of the Socialist Party, joined by thousands of other IWW members and their sympathizers.

=== Other labor involvement ===
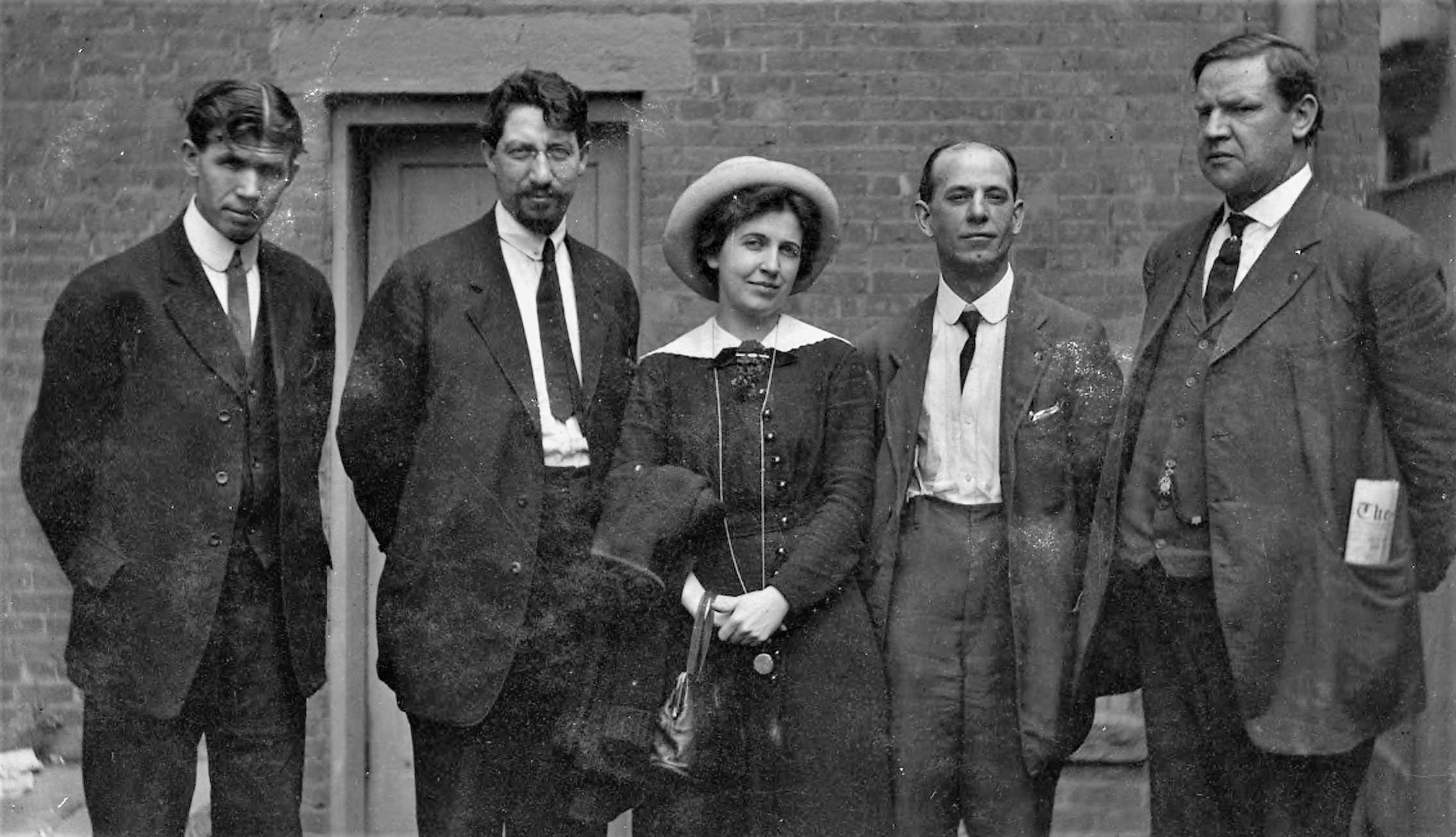
1913 photo of Paterson silk strike leaders Patrick L. Quinlan, Carlo Tresca, Elizabeth Gurley Flynn, Adolph Lessig, and Haywood

In 1913, Haywood was involved in the Paterson silk strike. He and approximately 1,850 strikers were arrested during the course of the strike. Despite the long holdout and fundraising efforts, the strike ended in failure on July 28, 1913.

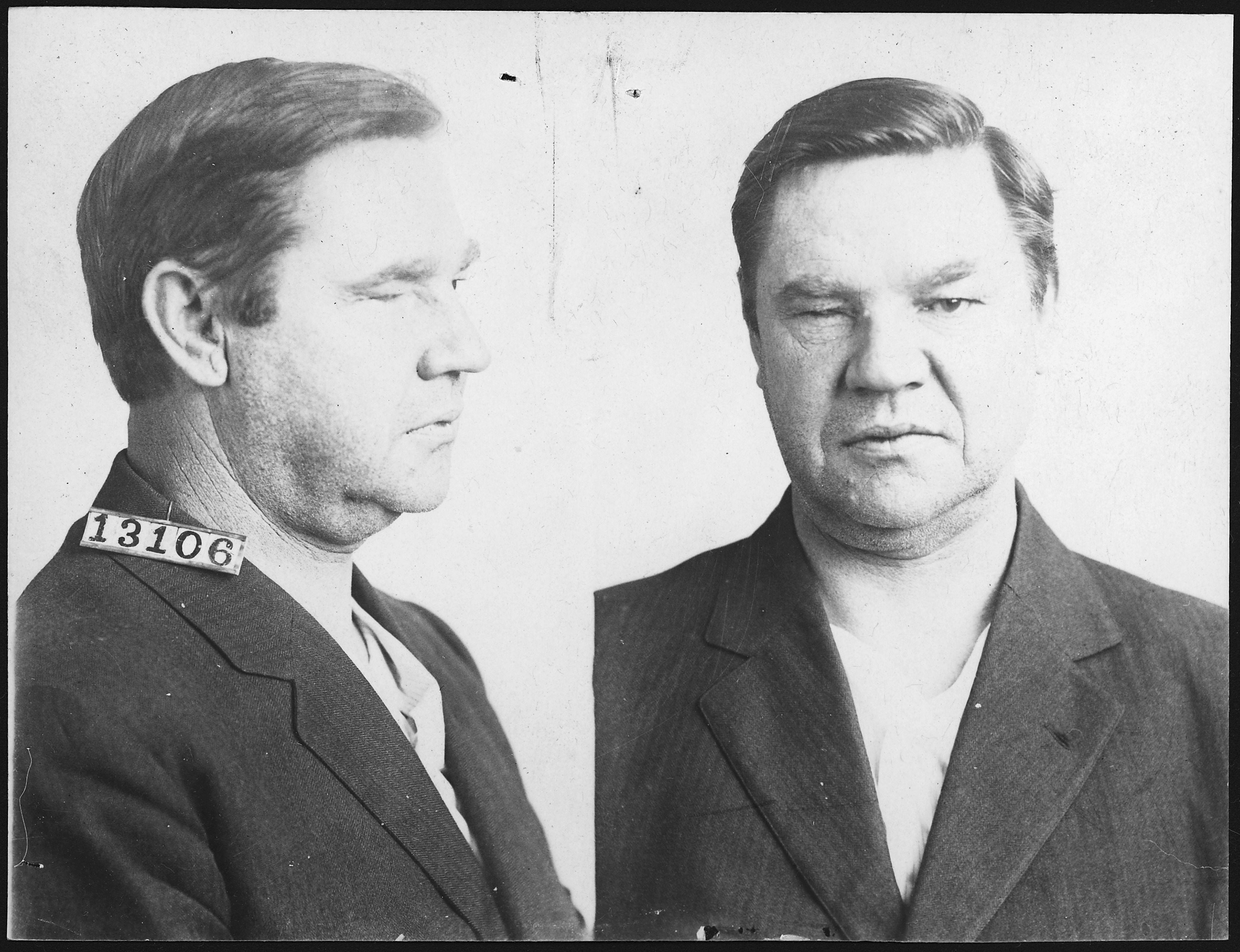
William Haywood mug shot at the United States Penitentiary, Leavenworth in 1918

While in Paris in 1913 he heard about the Dublin lockout in Ireland. He collected 1000 francs in aid of the workers and travelled to Dublin.

In January 1915, Haywood replaced Vincent St. John as General Secretary-Treasurer of the IWW, which he held until October 1917. He returned to the position of GST from February 1918 until December of the same year when he was replaced by Peter Stone.

=== Espionage trial ===
Haywood and the IWW frequently clashed with the government during their labor actions. The onset of World War I gave the federal government the opportunity to take action against Haywood and the IWW. Using the newly passed Espionage Act of 1917 as justification, the Department of Justice raided forty-eight IWW meeting halls on September 5, 1917. The Department of Justice, with the approval of President Woodrow Wilson, then proceeded to arrest 165 IWW members for "conspiring to hinder the draft, encourage desertion, and intimidate others in connection with labor disputes."

In April 1918, Haywood and 100 of the arrested IWW members began their trial, presided over by Judge Kenesaw Mountain Landis. The trial lasted five months, the longest criminal trial up to that time; Haywood himself testified for three days. All 101 defendants were found guilty, and Haywood (along with fourteen others) was sentenced to twenty years in prison.

Despite the efforts of his supporters, Haywood was unable to overturn the conviction. On March 31, 1921, he skipped bail while out on appeal and fled to the Russian SFSR. IWW officials were taken by surprise that Haywood had jumped bail, with his own attorney declaring that, "Haywood has committed hara-kiri so far as the labor movement is concerned if he has really run away. He will be disowned by the IWW and all sympathizers." A bond in the amount of $15,000 posted by millionaire supporter William Bross Lloyd was forfeited as a result of Haywood's flight.

=== Life in Soviet Russia ===
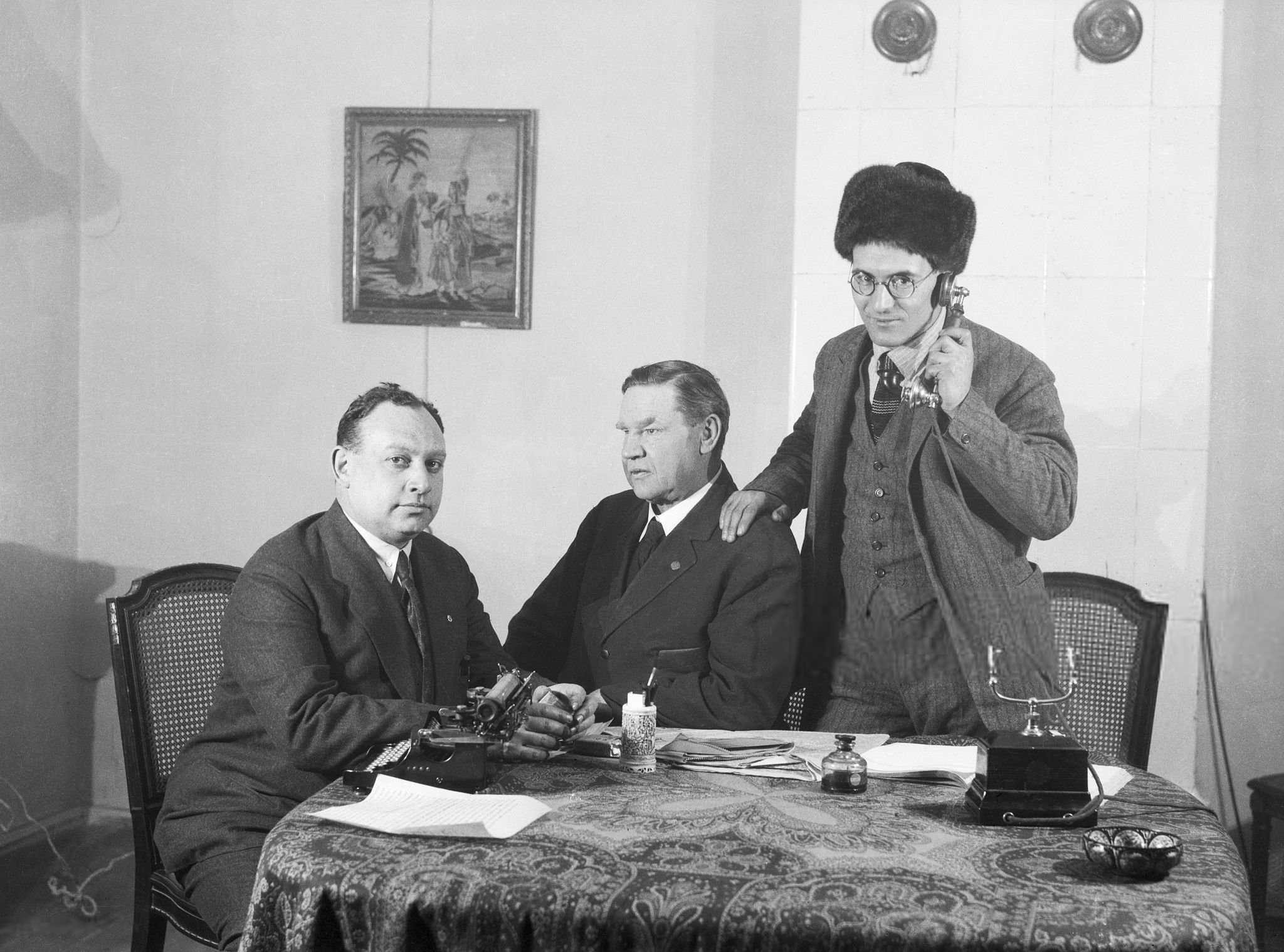
Haywood (center) with William Shatoff (left) and George Andreytchine in Soviet Russia, February 24, 1922.

In Soviet Russia, Haywood became a labor advisor to Lenin's Bolshevik government, and served in that position until 1923. Haywood also participated in the founding of the Kuzbass Autonomous Industrial Colony. Various visitors to Haywood's small Moscow apartment in later years recalled that he felt lonely and depressed, and expressed a desire to return to the U.S. In 1926 he took a Russian wife, even though she did not speak English and he did not speak Russian at the time of their marriage.

=== Death ===
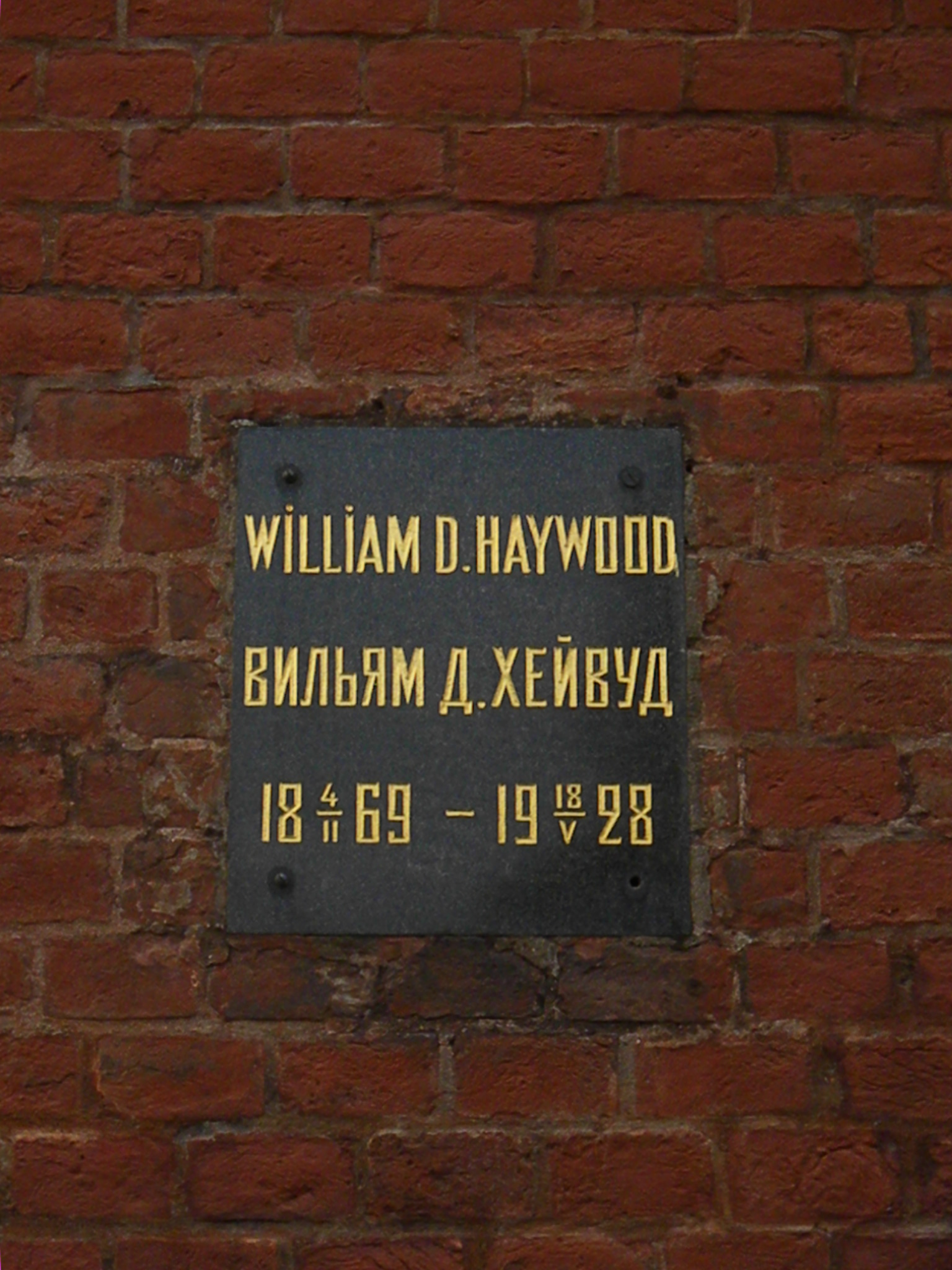
Plaque indicating Haywood's interment in the Kremlin Wall

On May 18, 1928, Haywood died at age 59 in a Moscow hospital from a stroke brought on by alcoholism and diabetes. Half of his ashes were buried in the Kremlin wall; an urn containing the other half of his ashes was sent to Chicago and buried near the Haymarket Martyrs' Monument.

== Haywood's labor philosophy ==
=== Industrial unionism ===
Even before Haywood first became an official with the WFM, he was convinced that the system under which working people toiled was unjust. He described the execution of the Haymarket leaders in 1887 as a turning point in his life, predisposing him toward membership in the largest organization of the day, the Knights of Labor. Haywood had watched men die in unsafe mine tunnels, and had marched with Coxey's Army. Haywood had suffered a serious hand injury in the mines, and found that his only support came from other miners. When Haywood listened to Ed Boyce of the WFM addressing a group of miners in 1896, he discovered radical unionism and welcomed it.

Haywood also shared Boyce's skepticism of the role played by the AFL. He criticized labor officials who were, in his view, insufficiently supportive of labor militants. For example, Haywood recalled with disdain the opening remarks of Samuel Gompers when the AFL leader appeared before Illinois Governor Richard Oglesby on behalf of the Haymarket prisoners:

I have differed all my life with the principles and methods of the condemned.

Gompers was an advocate of craft unionism, the idea that workers should be separated into unions according to their skills. The AFL disdained to organize workers who were not skilled. Furthermore, in 1900, Gompers became the first vice-president of the National Civic Federation, which was "dedicated to the fostering of harmony and collaboration between capital and organized labor". But Haywood had become convinced by the experiences of striking railroad workers that a different union philosophy, some form of industrial unionism, was necessary for workers to obtain justice. This had become apparent in 1888 when the craft-organized locomotive firemen kept their engines running, helping their employers to break a strike called by the railroad engineers.

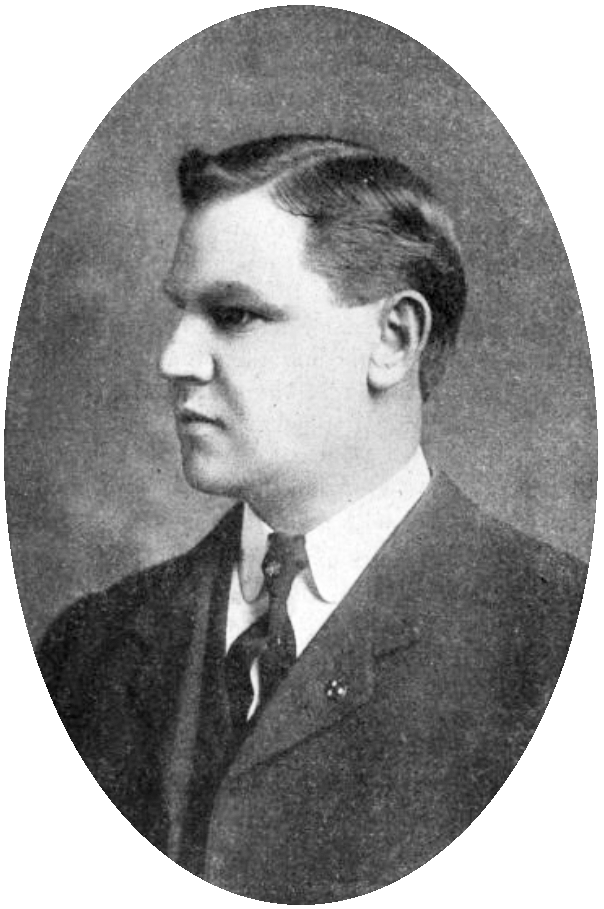
Haywood from Emma Langdon's The Cripple Creek Strike

Debs had been head of the locomotive firemen's union, but he resigned to create the American Railway Union (ARU), organized industrially to include all railroad workers. In June 1894, the ARU voted to join in solidarity with the ongoing Pullman Strike. Railroad traffic throughout the nation was "largely paralyzed. The effectiveness of the industrial form of unionism was evident from the start." The strike was eventually crushed by massive government intervention that included 2600 Deputy U.S. Marshals, and 14,000 state and federal troops in Chicago alone. Debs attempted to seek help from the AFL, asking that AFL railroad brotherhood affiliates present the following proposition to the Railway Managers' Association:

...that the strikers return to work at once as a body, upon the condition that they be restored to their former positions, or, in the event of failure, to call a general strike.

Observing that the ARU was defenseless, AFL officials viewed the plight of the rival organization as an opportunity to bolster the railway brotherhoods, which the AFL was courting, and instructed all AFL affiliates to withhold help. In spite of what Haywood perceived as "treachery" and "double-cross" by the AFL leadership — the ARU members had put their own organization at risk for others, but the AFL refused to even help them try to end the strike in a draw — the power of workers crossing their trade lines and jurisdictional boundaries to join together in a fight against capital greatly impressed him. He described the revelation of such power as "a great rift of light".

For Haywood, industrial union principles were later confirmed by the defeat of the WFM in the 1903–05 Cripple Creek strike due — he believed — to insufficient labor solidarity. The WFM miners had sought to extend the benefits of union to the mill workers who processed their ore. Since the government had crushed the ARU, the railroad workers were again organized along craft lines, similar to the AFL. Those same railroad unions continued to haul the ore from mines that were run by strike breakers, to mills that were run by strike breakers. "The railroaders form the connecting link in the proposition that is scabby at both ends," Haywood complained. "This fight, which is entering its third year, could have been won in three weeks if it were not for the fact that the trade unions are lending assistance to the mine operators." The obvious solution, it seemed to Haywood, was for all of the workers to join the same union, and to take collective action in concert against the employers. The militants of the WFM referred to the AFL as the "American Separation of Labor," a criticism that was later echoed by the IWW.

=== Haywood's revolutionary imperative ===
"[The mine owners] did not find the gold, they did not mine the gold, they did not mill the gold, but by some weird alchemy all the gold belonged to them!"

— Haywood, William D. The Autobiography of Big Bill Haywood. New York: International Publishers, 1929, p. 171

Haywood's industrial unionism was much broader than formulating a more effective method of conducting strikes. Haywood grew up a part of the working class, and his respect for working people was genuine. He was quickly angered by the arrogance of employers "who had never ... spoken to a workingman except to give orders." Having met Debs during his WFM days, Haywood had also become interested in the former railway leader's new passion, socialism. Haywood subscribed to the belief, and with Boyce, formulated as a new motto for the WFM, that:

Labor produces all wealth; all wealth belongs to the producer thereof.

Haywood observed how the government frequently took the side of business to defeat the tactics and the aspirations of the miners. During an 1899 organizing drive in Coeur d'Alene, Idaho, with pay cuts as a motivating issue, the company hired spies and then fired organizers and pro-union miners. Some frustrated miners responded with violence and when two men were killed, martial law was declared. As they had done in a strike in Coeur d'Alene seven years earlier, soldiers acted as strike breakers. They rounded up hundreds of union members without formal charges and put them in a filthy, vermin-infested warehouse without sanitation services for a year. They were so crowded that the soldiers locked the overflow of prisoners in boxcars. One local union leader was imprisoned for 17 years.

Haywood considered the brutal conditions in Coeur d'Alene a manifestation of class warfare. In 1901 the miners agreed at the WFM convention that a "complete revolution of social and economic conditions" was "the only salvation of the working classes".

In the WFM's 1903–1904 struggle in Colorado, with martial law once again in force, two declarations uttered by the National Guard and recorded for posterity further clarified the relationship of the mine operator's enforcement army—provided courtesy of the Colorado governor—to the workers. When union attorneys asked the courts to free illegally imprisoned strikers, Adjutant General Sherman Bell declared, "Habeas corpus be damned, we'll give 'em post mortems." Reminded of the Constitution, one of Bell's junior officers declared coolly, "To hell with the Constitution. We're not going by the Constitution."

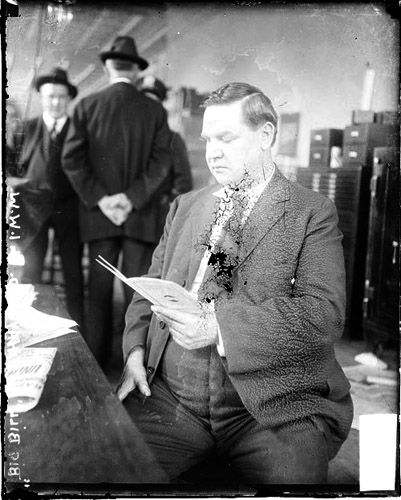
Haywood at a convention in Chicago (1917)

General Bell had been the manager of one of the coal mines in Cripple Creek where the strike was taking place. It wasn't any surprise to Haywood that soldiers seemed to be working in the interests of the employers; he had seen that situation before. But when the Colorado legislature acknowledged the complaints of organized labor and passed an eight hour law, the Colorado supreme court declared it unconstitutional. So the WFM took the issue to the voters, and 72 percent of the state's voters approved the referendum. But the Colorado government ignored the results of the referendum.

To members of the WFM, it became clear that government favored the companies, and only direct action by organized workers could secure the eight-hour day for themselves. When miners in Idaho Springs and Telluride decided to strike for the eight-hour day, they were rounded up at gunpoint by vigilante groups and expelled from their communities. Warrants were issued for the arrest of the law-breaking vigilantes, but they were not acted upon.

Haywood complained that John D. Rockefeller was "wielding more power with his golf sticks than could the people of Colorado with their ballots." It appeared to Haywood that the deck was stacked, and no enduring gains could be won for the workers short of changing the rules of the game. Increasingly, his industrial unionism took on a revolutionary flavor. In 1905 Haywood joined the more left-leaning socialists, labor anarchists in the Haymarket tradition, and other militant unionists to formulate the concept of revolutionary industrial unionism that animated the IWW. Haywood called this philosophy "socialism with its working clothes on".

Haywood favored direct action. The socialist philosophy — which WFM supporter the Rev. Fr. Thomas J. Hagerty called "slowcialism" — did not seem hard-nosed enough for Haywood's labor instincts. After the Boise murder trial, he had come to believe,

It is to the ignominy of the Socialist Party and the Socialist Labor Party that they have so seldom joined forces with the I.W.W. in these desperate political struggles.

While Haywood continued to champion direct action, he advocated the political action favored by the socialists as just one more mechanism for change, and only when it seemed relevant. At an October 1913 meeting of the Socialist Party, Haywood stated:

I advocate the industrial ballot alone when I address the workers in the textile industries of the East where a great majority are foreigners without political representation. But when I speak to American workingmen in the West I advocate both the industrial and the political ballot.

The "industrial ballot" referred to the direct action methods (strikes, slowdowns, etc.) of the IWW.

Haywood seemed most comfortable with a philosophy arrived at through the hard-scrabble experiences of the workers. He had the ability to translate complex economic theories into simple ideas that resonated with working people. He distilled the voluminous work of Karl Marx into a simple observation, "If one man has a dollar he didn't work for, some other man worked for a dollar he didn't get." While Haywood respected the work of Marx, he referred to it with irreverent humor. Acknowledging his scars from dangerous mining work, and from numerous fistfights with police and militia, he liked to say, "I've never read Marx's Capital, but I have the marks of capital all over me."

Haywood demonstrated his Marxist roots when, confronted by the Commission on Industrial Relations with an argument about the sanctity of private property, he responded that a capitalist's property merely represented "unpaid labor, surplus value." But the forum also gave Haywood an opportunity to compare the philosophy of the IWW with that of Marx and the socialist parties. Reminded by the Commission that socialists advocated ownership of the industries by the state, Haywood remembered in his autobiography that he had drawn a clear distinction. All of industry should be owned "by the workers", he observed.

=== Racial unity in the labor movement ===
Much of Haywood's philosophy relating to socialism, preferring industrial unionism, his perception of the evils of the wage system, and his attitude about corporations, militias, and politicians seems to have been held in common with his WFM mentor Ed Boyce. Boyce also called for legislation to forbid employment of aliens. Unlike Boyce and many other labor leaders and organizations of the time, Haywood believed that workers of all ethnicities should organize into the same union. According to Haywood, the IWW was "big enough to take in the black man, the white man; big enough to take in all nationalities – an organization that will be strong enough to obliterate state boundaries; to obliterate national boundaries."

Haywood criticized the U.S. government's attempts to turn whites against blacks during the 1899 Coeur d'Alene labor confrontation. Haywood wrote: "it was a deliberate attempt to add race prejudice ... race prejudice had been unknown among the miners." In 1912, Haywood spoke at a convention for The Brotherhood of Timber Workers in Louisiana; at the time, interracial meetings in the state were illegal. Haywood insisted that the white workers invite the African American workers to their convention, declaring:

You work in the same mills together. Sometimes a black man and a white man chop down the same tree together. You are meeting in a convention now to discuss the conditions under which you labor. Why not be sensible about this and call the Negroes into the Convention? If it is against the law, this is one time when the law should be broken.

Ignoring the law against interracial meetings, the convention invited the African American workers. The convention would eventually vote to affiliate with the IWW.

== Works ==
- Industrial Socialism With Frank Bohn. Chicago: Charles H. Kerr & Co., 1911.
- The General Strike. Chicago: Charles H. Kerr & Co., n.d. [1911]. Speech of March 16, 1911.
- One Big Union or Transformed AF of L? Debate with Morris Hillquit. Serialized in Chicago Daily Socialist, Jan. 18–25, 1912.
- Speech of William D. Haywood on the Case of Ettor and Giovannitti, 1912.
- Bill Haywood Remembers the 1913 Paterson Strike
- With Drops of Blood the History of the Industrial Workers of the World Has Been Written. n.c. (Chicago): Industrial Workers of the World, n.d. (1919).
- Raids! Raids!! Raids!!! n.c. (Chicago): Industrial Workers of the World, n.d. (Dec. 1919).
- Bill Haywood's Book: The Autobiography of Big Bill Haywood. New York: International Publishers, 1929. Reissued as The Autobiography of Big Bill Haywood.

== See also ==
- Industrial Workers of the World
- Western Federation of Miners
- 1913 Paterson Silk Strike
- International Labor Defense
- Are They Going To Hang My Papa?
