= Charles Moyer =

American labor leader

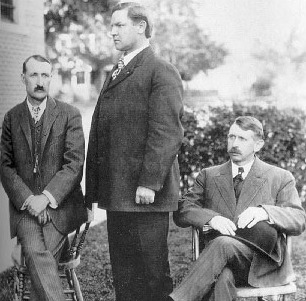
1907 photo of (l-r) Charles Moyer, Bill Haywood, and George Pettibone

Charles H. Moyer (1866 – June 2, 1929) was an American labor leader and president of the Western Federation of Miners (WFM) from 1902 to 1926. He led the union through the Colorado Labor Wars, was accused of murdering an ex-governor of the state of Idaho, and was shot in the back during a bitter copper mine strike. He also was a leading force in founding the Industrial Workers of the World, (IWW) although he later denounced the organization.

== Early life ==
Little is known about Moyer prior to 1893. He was born near Ames, Iowa. Moyer's parents, William and Maria Drew Moyer, were natives of Pennsylvania who migrated to Indiana by 1852 and on to Iowa by 1860. Charles was the youngest of five brothers and two sisters who survived their mother who died at the age of thirty-nine-years-old in 1870. In 1870, one of the sisters, a sixteen-year-old, had assumed the task of housekeeping for the family and care of Charles who was a sickly infant and youth. He attended public school but left after the fourth grade.

Moyer headed West in 1872 and found work as a cowboy in Wyoming. He returned East in 1885 and settled in Chicago, Illinois. He committed robbery, and served a year in the Illinois State Penitentiary. After his release, Moyer became a miner at the Homestake Mine in Lead, South Dakota, and joined the Lead City Miners' Union. In 1893, the Lead City Miners' Union was one of several unions which formed the Western Federation of Miners.

Moyer was elected to the Executive Board of the WFM in 1900. After President Ed Boyce declined to run again in 1902, Moyer was elected his successor.

== WFM presidency ==
Moyer was strongly committed to industrial unionism, and pushed the WFM to organize both underground and surface miners as well as all ancillary mine workers.

=== Colorado Labor Wars ===
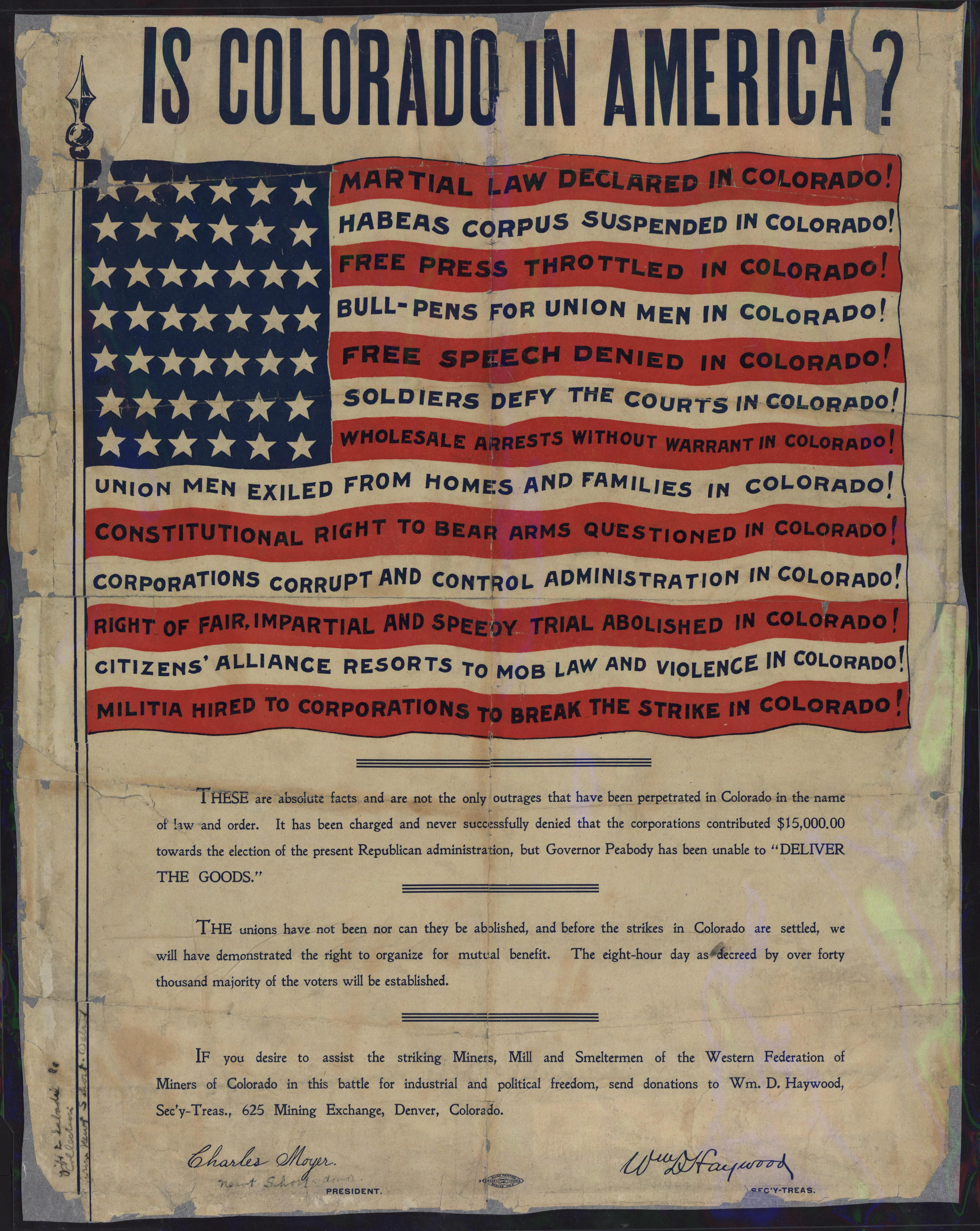
The poster "Is Colorado in America?", with signature by Charles Moyer (bottom, left), which led to his arrest in 1904.

Moyer's push for industrial union organizing involved the union in what came to be known as the Colorado Labor Wars. In August 1902, the WFM organized mill workers in Colorado City, Colorado. The employers planted a labor spy in the union, and 42 union members were fired. Negotiations over the dismissals dragged on into 1903. On February 14, 1903, the WFM struck. The employers claimed a riot was in progress, and Governor James Peabody called out the Colorado militia to suppress the strike. Miners in Cripple Creek and Telluride also struck, and the militia was deployed in those cities as well. Mass arrests began in September 1903 which finally broke the strike.

One of those arrested was Moyer. He had gone to Telluride to protest the mass arrests and deportation of miners. While there, he lent his signature to a WFM poster decrying the arrests. Moyer was arrested on March 28, 1904, for desecrating the American flag. He was released on bail, but re-arrested the following day on the orders of Adjutant General Sherman Bell of the state militia on charges of "military necessity". When Moyer successfully petitioned for a writ of habeas corpus, the Colorado State Attorney General and the local district attorney refused to release him. Moyer appealed to the Colorado Supreme Court On June 6, 1904, the court ruled in In re Moyer, 35 Colo. 163, that it could not question the governor's finding that insurrection existed in Colorado and that Moyer had not been arrested or imprisoned in violation of his rights. Moyer appealed to the U.S. District Court for the District of Missouri, and obtained a writ of habeas corpus on July 5, 1904. Alarmed by the writ, Governor Peabody revoked the finding of insurrection the same day and ordered Moyer released by 3:45 p.m. (before the federal writ could be served). Moyer was released, but his case continued to the U.S. Supreme Court. On January 18, 1909, the U.S. Supreme Court reaffirmed the decision of the Colorado Supreme Court in Moyer v. Peabody, 212 U.S. 78. Writing for the majority, Justice Oliver Wendell Holmes Jr. refused to question the governor's assertion of facts which led to the declaration of martial law or grounds for Moyer's arrest. Concluding that the governor's good faith would protect a person's constitutional rights, Holmes held that Moyer's civil liberties had not been infringed.

=== Radicalization ===
The state's use of military power to crush union organizing drives convinced Moyer that no single union could be effective or successful. He concluded that only "one big union" linked to a strong political party could effectively counteract the anti-union power of the state and employers. Moyer subsequently became a strong supporter of the Socialist Party of America.

In January 1905, Moyer participated in a conference in Chicago to consider whether the Socialist Party would be an effective vehicle for labor's goals. It was at this conference that the delegates decided to form a new union, the Industrial Workers of the World (IWW). When the IWW was formed in Chicago on June 27, 1905, Moyer immediately affiliated the WFM with the new labor federation.

=== The Haywood trial ===
In 1906, Moyer was implicated in the assassination of Frank Steunenberg, ex-Governor of Idaho. On December 30, 1905, Steunenberg, who had clashed with the WFM during several strikes, was killed by an explosion at his home in Caldwell, Idaho. Harry Orchard, a former WFM member who had once acted as Moyer's bodyguard, was arrested for the crime. Using coercion and intimidation (including restricted food rations and threats of immediate execution), Pinkerton agent James McParland wrung a 64-page confession from Orchard. The confession named Moyer and other WFM leaders as the instigators of the bombing plot.

But Moyer was in Colorado, not Idaho. Idaho authorities were concerned that Orchard's confession would not be enough to persuade a judge to issue extradition papers. Acting in concert with law enforcement leaders, McParland perjured himself to convince a judge to issue the extradition papers against Moyer, falsely representing that Moyer had been in Idaho at the time of the murder, and was a fugitive from justice (under Idaho law, conspirators were considered to be present at the scene of the crime.) McParland arrived in Denver on Thursday, February 15, and presented the extradition papers to Colorado Governor McDonald, who, by prior arrangement with the governor of Idaho, accepted them immediately. But they waited until Saturday evening to arrest Haywood, Pettigrew, and Moyer, then held the three overnight in the Denver Jail, and refused requests by the three to contact lawyers and family. Early Sunday morning the prisoners were put on a special train, and guarded by Colorado militia, were sped to Idaho. Although the events were very controversial, the extradition was ultimately upheld by the US Supreme Court.

Haywood and Pettibone were acquitted in separate trials, after which charges against Moyer were dropped.

=== Conservatism ===
His experiences with the IWW led Moyer to the conclusion that the federation was too radical. Moyer was especially disturbed by the IWW's refusal to ally with or endorse any political party, which had been the key to Moyer's support for the creation of the IWW. In 1908, Moyer led the WFM out of the IWW, taking most of the IWW's membership (which belonged to the WFM) with him. Concerned that the WFM's reputation for radicalism was making it difficult to reach collective bargaining agreements, Moyer re-affiliated his union with the conservative American Federation of Labor (AFL) in 1911.

Moyer pushed for more traditional labor union policies in his last decade in office. He forced the union's locals to agree to contracts which expired after a set period of time. He pushed resolutions through the WFM convention committing the union to the same limited legislative goals favored by the AFL such as the eight-hour day, a ban on child labor, and controls on immigration. He also withdrew his support for the Socialist Party and adopted the policy of nonpartisanship advocated by Samuel Gompers.

WFM membership declined sharply from 1911 to 1916. In part, this was due to the continuing intense opposition from mine owners in the West. But conflict with the IWW also led to significant membership losses. Historian Vernon H. Jensen has asserted that the IWW had a "rule or ruin" policy, under which it attempted to wreck local unions which it could not control. From 1908 to 1921, Jensen and others have written, the IWW attempted to win power in WFM locals which had once formed the federation's backbone. When it could not do so, IWW agitators undermined WFM locals, which caused the national union to shed nearly half its membership. Paul Brissenden noted WFM dissatisfaction with the IWW in Jerome, Arizona in 1913, attributing some of the friction to the fact that the WFM was becoming more conservative, accepting contracts with employers and affiliating with the AFL, while the IWW was becoming more revolutionary. (The IWW would not begin to accept contracts with employers until 1938.)

The greatest animosity between the two organizations occurred in Butte, and resulted in the Butte, Montana labor riots of 1914. When Moyer went to Butte to mediate differences between the WFM loyalists and a dissident faction sympathetic to the IWW, he barely escaped from the WFM union hall before dissidents destroyed the building with dynamite. Moyer hid from the mob until he left town before dawn the next morning.

Historian Melvyn Dubofsky, however, offers a different perspective. In Minnesota, for example, the miners went on strike in 1916 to abolish the contract system, to secure a minimum wage, and to end exploitation by the company. They approached the AFL and the WFM, both of which failed to respond. Dubofsky notes, "IWW headquarters had been advised of employee discontent on the eve of the [strike] ... and the IWW instantly had organizers on the spot." Dubofsky states that the walkout occurred without IWW involvement, and he describes the evidence for this as "incontrovertible". The IWW was approached for help and, according to Dubofsky, the IWW "achieved its aims not by coercion but by giving the striking miners leadership, funds, and publicity."

With the companies and the press accusing the IWW of sending "outside agitators", M.E. Shusterich, one of the Mesabi Range strike leaders, attempted to "set the record straight":

"This strike was not started by the I.W.W., but has been underway the past six years. We have appealed to every labor official in Minnesota to have the miners on the range organized, but we have been shuttled back and forth between the Western Federation of Miners and other organizations who passed us on again until finally the miners took things into their own hands and went out without organization."

According to Marxist historian Philip S. Foner, the issues of socialism and industrial unionism — and more specifically, the AFL vs. the IWW — had been debated by the Minnesota miners since the WFM's Mesabi Range strike of 1907. Foner concluded that in the 1916 strike, "Most of the Range Finns ... backed the I.W.W."

Whatever the reasons for the decline, the WFM was particularly hard hit in the copper mining industries of Michigan and Arizona, and in the WFM's stronghold around Butte, Montana.

In 1916, Moyer led a successful movement to change the union's name to the International Union of Mine, Mill, and Smelter Workers (colloquially known as "Mine Mill").

== Copper Country Strike of 1913-1914 ==
=== Organization of workers ===
The Western Federation of Miners began to heavily increase its presence in the Copper Country in 1912. Moyer warned WFM organizer Thomas Strizich on March 25, 1913, against calling a strike prematurely:

I was much pleased to hear of the progress being made in the way of organizing in Michigan and sincerely trust that the men there will realize the importance, in fact the absolute necessity, of deferring action that may precipitate a conflict with the employers until they have practically a thorough organization.

=== Initial involvement in the strike ===
When the Copper Country miners went out on strike on July 23, 1913, Moyer was at a conference in Europe, and so Vice President Charles E. Mahoney had to assume control of the strike until his return to the Copper Country.

On August 22, soon after Moyer returned to Denver, he asked American Federation of Labor (AFL) President Samuel Gompers for financial aid for the Michigan strikers. Six days later the AFL Executive Council endorsed the strike; it did not assess affiliates but suggested an immediate appropriation of at least five cents per member. On that same day on which Moyer wrote to Gompers, the WFM sent $25,000 to Michigan, bringing the total to only $36,000 which had to suffice until September 12.

On Sunday afternoon, August 31, a crowd of 2,700, 800 of them women and children, marched in sweltering heat to pack the Palestra, a "colossal oven," where Moyer encouraged them to continue early morning picketing, telling them they had the right to peacefully persuade men to stay away from work. The WFM Executive Board fully sanctioned their strike, he told them. He had told reporters that the WFM had all kinds of money, piles and stacks of it. He assured the strikers that benefits would be forthcoming: the WFM had $161,000 "in cash here"; an assessment of $2 had been levied for September on each WFM member—90,000 of them, Moyer had said, doubling the actual membership figure. The $161,000 had included the loans he hoped to procure, but he did not tell them that. Rather, he depicted a financially secure WFM, ready and able to finance the strike, a characterization that was most unreal. The strikers passed resolutions calling for a Senate investigation, protesting the militia, and denouncing the deputies.

A Mining Gazette reporter termed Moyer's speech a refreshing change from the "radical . . . viciously inflammatory" oratory of Miller and Mahoney. Were there "a few more conservative talkers such as Moyer there might be a chance, many people believe, for the federation to accomplish something, for the other class of verbal bombs is reacting against the organization," the reporter stated. Moyer was long-winded and not an effective orator, he continued, but he really made "a nice little argument from the WFM point of view." Moyer said that he favored having the militia in the district but that "the governor should order them to disarm all these thugs and gunmen, load them on trains and dump them without the confines of the state." The reporter commented that "in this statement Moyer has the approval of a great many people on both sides of the strike question."

=== Meeting with Ferris and Darrow ===
Moyer cut short his visit to the strike zone to confer with Governor Woodbridge N. Ferris on September 3. Joining him was Clarence Darrow, who had previously defended Moyer, Haywood, and Pettibone in the Steunenberg murder case. Moyer and Darrow asked the governor to again try to arbitrate the strike. The strikers would not insist on mentioning the WFM in any settlement, but would insist on the right to organize and select representatives. Ferris was skeptical, saying it resembled his earlier rejected proposals: "When James MacNaughton says that he will let grass grow in the streets before he will ever treat with the Western Federation of Miners or its representatives, I believe what he says." Moyer countered: "I'm not willing to admit yet that James MacNaughton will not recognize organized labor before he dies."

Moyer and Darrow gave Ferris affidavits claiming Waddell men were serving as deputies. He read the telegram he had sent James A. Cruse reminding him of the residency requirement for deputies, and he said: "Cruse knows what the law is but in Keweenaw County we have a sheriff that can take care of absolutely nothing. Sheriff Hepping [sic] cannot even take care of his cat." Neither Moyer nor Darrow had criticized Ferris for sending in the militia. Moyer claimed to the governor that almost all "of the 16,000 men on strike now belong to the WFM." At Ferris's urging, Darrow accompanied Moyer back to Calumet.

=== Return to Michigan's Copper district ===
Moyer returned to the district for a day with Darrow and then went to Chicago to confer with Duncan McDonald of the Illinois division of the United Mine Workers of America about a $100,000 loan. It was approved by the union's executive board and the money was made available in late September. Moyer also obtained a $25,000 loan from the United Brewery Workers of America, and contributions to the WFM's Michigan Defense Fund rose to $18,074 in September.

In mid-September Moyer returned to the district once more, to confer with the Department of Labor investigators. He and John Brown Lennon, AFL treasurer, spoke to a crowd of 2,000 at the Palestra on September 14. Moyer emphasized that any proposal for ending the strike must recognize the WFM.

=== December of 1913 ===
Tensions grew following the Jane-Dally murders. Special Houghton County Prosecutor George E. Nichols warned Moyer that he would hold him accountable if strikers attacked the Alliance parades. Moyer was said to have acted "promptly and creditably in joining with the prosecutor in an effort to prevent anything of that kind." The night before the meetings, Moyer told strikers at Red Jacket to avoid violence, and that the Alliance was looking for any opportunity to make trouble. Organizers Thomas Strizich, Yanko Terzich, Mor Oppman and Ben Goggin translated his message to the strikers.

Moyer notified U.S. Representative William Josiah MacDonald and AFL officials that mine operators and the Alliance had announced on December 10 that they would give all representatives of organized labor from outside the state twenty-four hours to leave and that "if they fail to do so, they [would] be sent out of the district in a manner most convenient and effective." Moyer urged the AFL to give this the greatest publicity and call it to the immediate attention of President Woodrow Wilson. Moyer also wired Governor Ferris that "operators and others, calling themselves law and order citizens, threaten to deport from this district or remove by the quickest possible means of citizens of other states against whom no charges have been made other than that they dare to represent labor." Ferris then advised Nichols at once that "citizens must not commit violence on any citizen of Michigan or of any other state . . . protection must be given to all alike." He commanded him to consult with military authorities and to see that peace and dignity were maintained.

Moyer's return to the Michigan copper district in the wake of the Jane-Dally murders marked his fifth trip to the Copper Country during the strike and his first since October. It would be his longest stay. Local newspapers printed names of "outside labor agitators" still within the district. As the grand jury started its work, Judge Orrin N. Hilton of Denver arrived to reinforce the WFM's legal staff. Moyer, one of the first witnesses before the jury, testified for two days. The jury got possession of the books and records of the Calumet WFM local, but the Ahmeek leaders, alike those over at South Range, claimed that their books had been sent to Denver.

Sheriff Cruse placed notices in the local newspapers reviewing lawlessness, disorder, and intimidation and stating that Moyer had been notified that the right to work must be respected, and that every man who wanted to work would be protected. Law officers appeared to be especially vigilant of activities of the strike leaders. Goggin was "run out of Laurium" after witnesses identified him as being involved in the beating of Calumet men in Laurium some time previous. On December 10 Judge Patrick Henry O'Brien granted a writ of injunction to WFM attorneys restraining members of the Alliance from interfering with WFM organizers, members, or officers. The Houghton Trades and Labor Council wired Ferris on December 11 saying that it feared bloodshed from the Alliance and asked for an immediate federal investigation of the situation.

=== After the Italian Hall disaster ===
Moyer was in Hancock, Michigan when he learned by telephone of the Italian Hall disaster, He summoned a meeting of the WFM on Christmas Day, where he set up a multilingual committee to consult with families of victims of the disaster about the funeral arrangements. Moyer announced that "the Western Federation of Miners will bury its own dead . . . the American labor movement will take care of the relatives of the deceased. No aid will be accepted from any of these citizens who a short time ago denounced these people as undesirable citizens."

The women of the Citizens' Alliance found themselves rejected in home after home. In one household where distress was acute, the family accepted money only to return it the next day. In most of the homes the people said that they had been told to accept aid only from union members. Moyer later denied making such recommendations but the evidence was unmistakable.

=== "Deportation" ===
The Citizens' Alliance relief committee subsequently decided to appeal to Moyer to come before them and explain the situation. Sheriff Cruse rejected that proposal. The feelings at Calumet were running so high that Cruse believed if Moyer "appeared there even under my protection he would be lynched." Headlines in the Mining Gazette epitomized the feeling: WHILE COPPER COUNTRY MOURNS FOR ITS DEAD, MOYER TRIED TO MAKE CAPITAL OF DISASTER and USES CHILDREN'S DEATHS TO BENEFIT HIS STRIKE. Cruse telephoned Moyer and arranged for a small committee to meet with him the evening of December 26 in Hancock. Cruse wanted a small group so that he could control it if anger got out of hand.

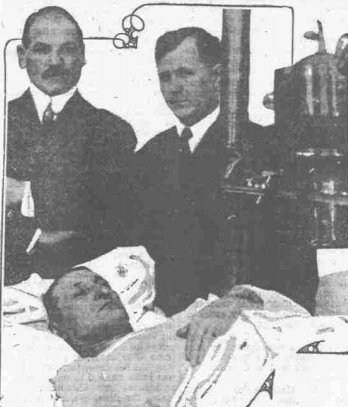
Moyer under X-ray at St. Luke's Hospital in Chicago

Moyer was assaulted — beaten and shot in the back by men in the employ of the mine owners. That evening, detectives from the city of Calumet escorted him, still bleeding, to a local train and "deported him" (e.g., ran him out of town). Moyer sought medical treatment in Chicago. State and Congressional investigations were unable to prove the identity of his assailants, and the crime went unsolved.

== Retirement and death ==
Moyer was unable to reverse the decline in Mine Mill's membership. After a bitter internal struggle, Moyer and his entire executive board resigned in 1926.

Moyer lived in relative obscurity until his death. He died in Pomona, California, on June 2, 1929.

== Notes ==
Trade union offices
Preceded by Ed Boyce	President, Western Federation of Miners; 1902 - 1926	Succeeded by John Sheridan
Preceded by Department founded	President of the Mining Department; 1912	Succeeded by John Phillip White
