= 1912 New York City waiters' strike =

American campaign

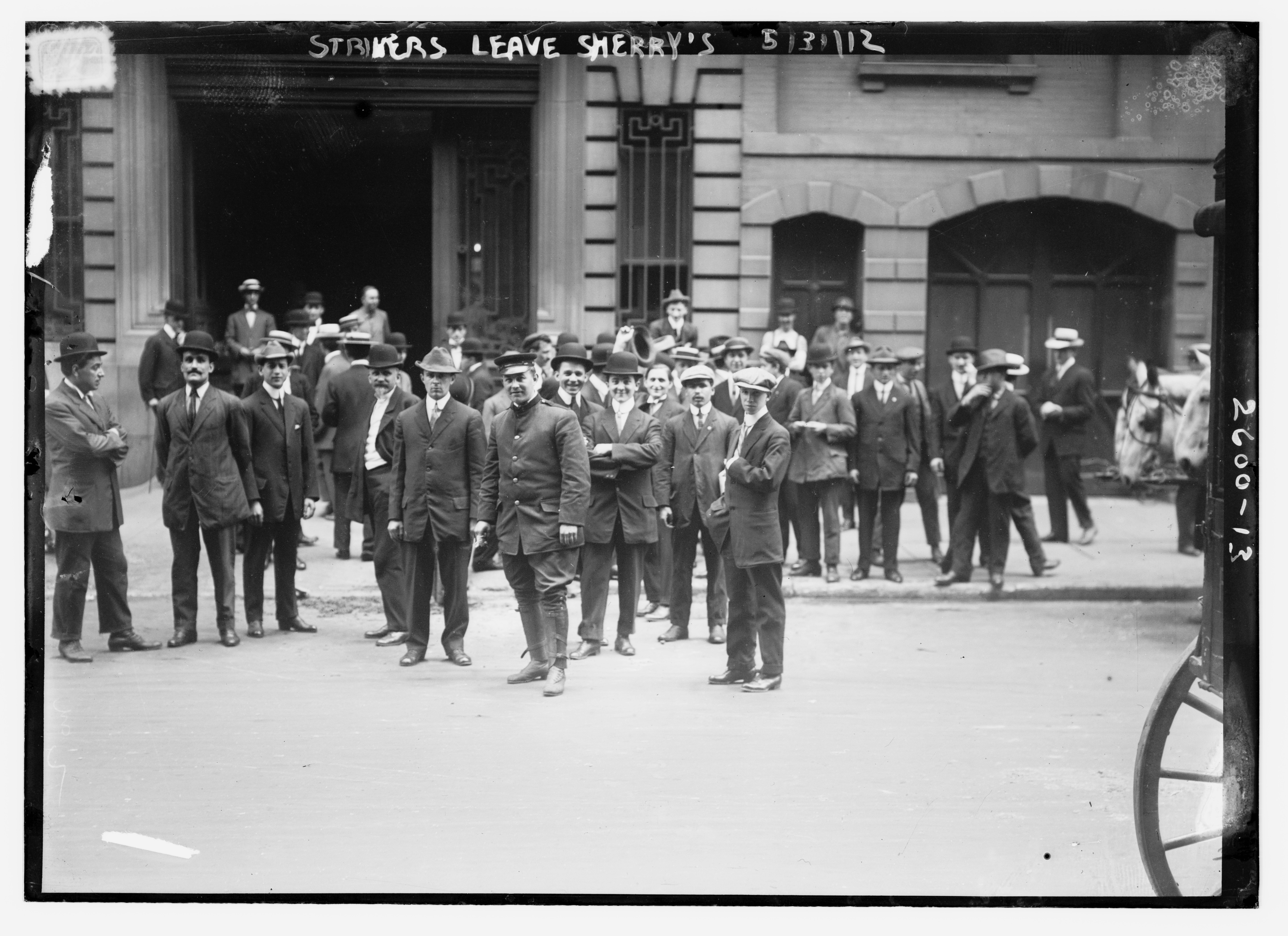
- New York City waiters' strike outside of Sherry's restaurant in Manhattan, 1912.
- Date: May 7 – June 25, 1912
- Location: New York City

Parties
Industrial Workers of the World (IWW); Hotel Workers' International Union	Hotel Men's Association

Lead figures
Joseph James Ettor; Strike leader (IWW); Elizabeth Gurley Flynn; Strike leader (IWW)	

The 1912 New York City waiters' strike began on May 7, 1912, at the Belmont Hotel and was the first general strike for waiters and hotel workers in New York City history. That day over 150 hotel workers walked out as a sign of protest against their poor working conditions. The strike was organized by Joseph James Ettor and Elizabeth Gurley Flynn of the Industrial Workers of the World (IWW) in conjunction with the Hotel Workers' International Union. At the height of the strike there were 54 hotels and 30 restaurants and other establishments without their staff. This amounted to 2,500 waiters, 1,000 cooks, and 3,000 other striking hotel workers. The strike continued through the rest of May but police began reprimanding protestors, making many of them go back to work. The strike officially ended on June 25, 1912.

== Rise of Strike ==
On May 7, 1912, a group of 150–300 waiters and other hotel staff walked out in the middle of a meal service at the Belmont Hotel in New York City. Upon leaving the Belmont Hotel, workers held signs and communicated their demands to the public, before being dispersed by police. The main demands for the hotel workers were:

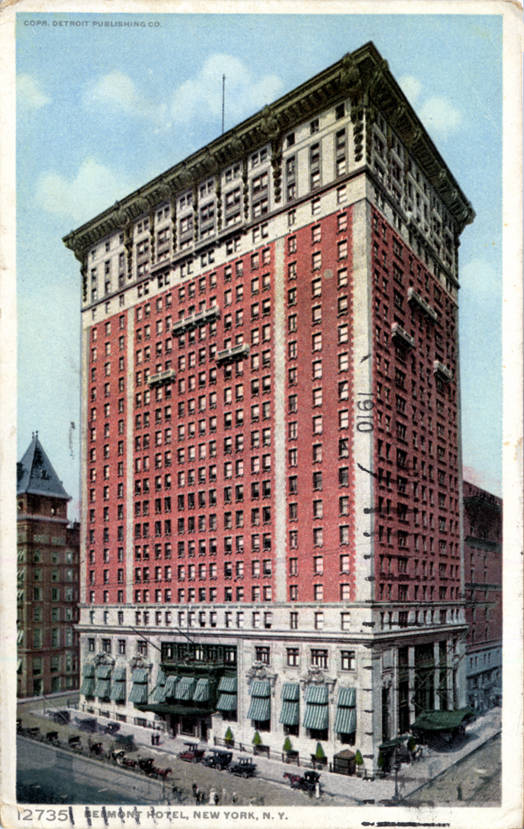
The Belmont Hotel where the strike started.

One day off per week,
A higher minimum wage,

$10 a week for established waiters,
$7 a week for bus boys and porters,
$5 a week for hotel maids,

Sanitary lockers and restrooms for hotel employees,
No fines for hotel workers who belonged to a union,
No unjust discrimination against employees due to union affiliation.

After this initial walkout, many other hotel employees started following suit. The IWW then created the Hotel Workers’ International Union. The next day the state labor employment bureau announced that the strike had ended, but the union announced that they were still on strike due to the unsatisfactory treatment of waiters who were union members. By May 15, 1912, around 150 employees from the Waldorf Astoria and the Vanderbilt also walked out to join the waiters’ strike.

On May 15 the a representative from the state labor employment bureau met with a member of the Hotel Workers' International Union to discuss the strike, and on May 17 a list of demands was created for the hotel workers. The New York Labor Bulletin stated that the union demanded one day off a week, a maximum ten-hour workday, sanitary lockers, overtime pay, and no fines for being a union member. On May 23, 1912, six of New York City's leading hotels with union affiliated employees had their thousands of waiters, bus boys, cooks, and other hotel staff walk out of their respective hotels. The union members scheduled to meet with the Hotel Men's Association on May 24, 1912, to discuss the terms of the end of the strike, however four days prior to the meeting the Hotel Men's Association cancelled stating that it could not meet due to a disturbance that happened at a union rally the previous Sunday.

== The IWW and the Hotel Workers' International Union ==
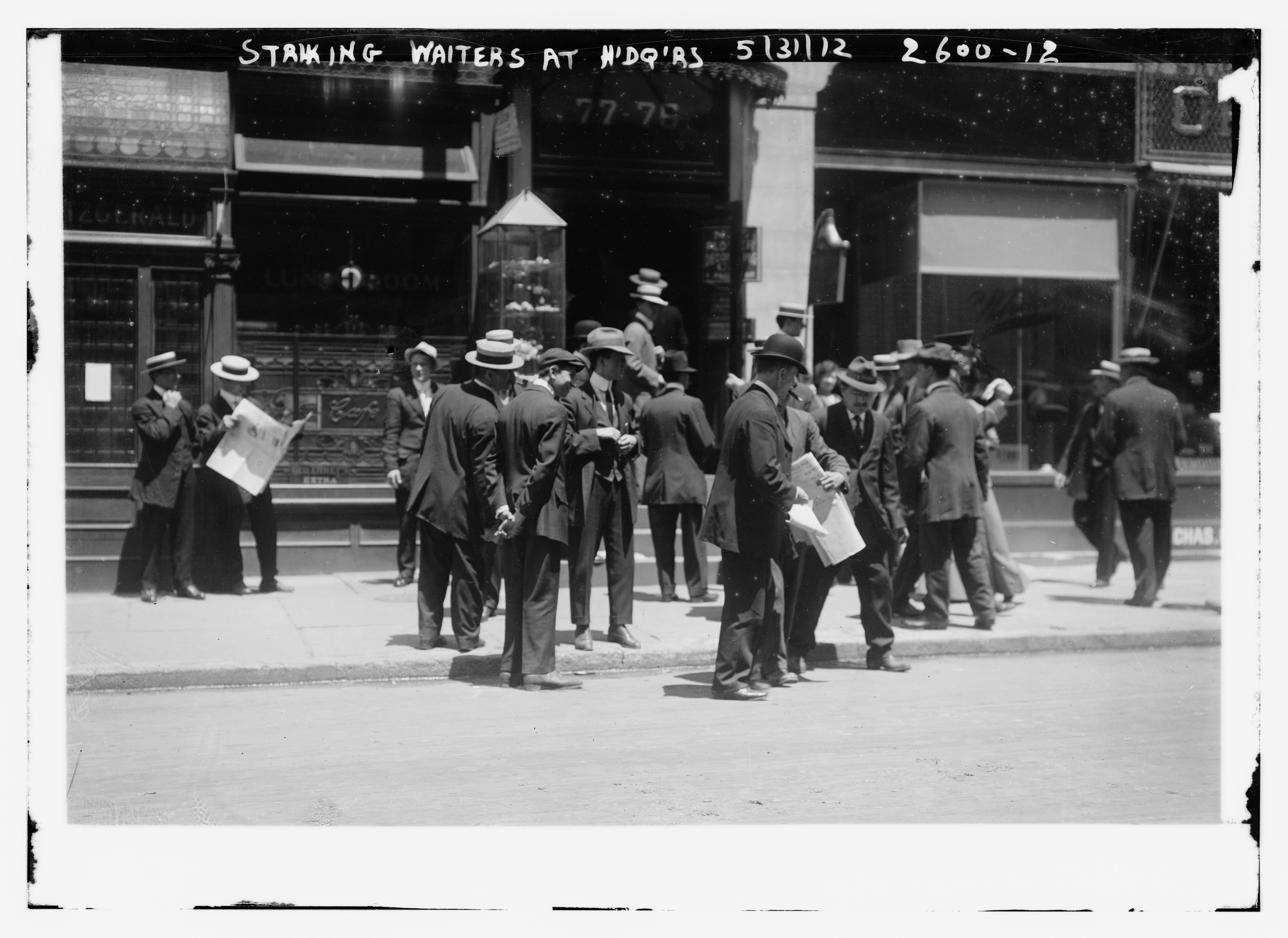
Striking waiters at headquarters, May 31, 1912.

In 1912 the IWW had been very successful in its organizing, and created the Hotel Workers' International Union. Before the IWW became involved in the 1912 New York City waiters' strike, the only union in place for hotel workers was the Hotel and Restaurant Employees and Bartenders International Union, which had about 2,000 members, most of whom were bartenders in local bars. Many waiters could not even afford the high membership dues that were required for the union, which effectively kept out lower-class workers who found themselves working in higher-class establishments.

This union was originally going to fight against the Hotel Men's Association; however, it was very disorganized, had trouble mobilizing its members, and excluded many of the workers who wanted to participate in the strike. In an attempt to accommodate lower-class waiters, the Hotel and Restaurant Employees and Bartenders International Union tried to make a waiter specific branch to their union called Local 5. However, when organizers continued to run into issues with the union attached to Local 5, another union was created by Joseph Estler, a former Local 5 organizer, in conjunction with the IWW to further the rights of hotel waiters and other hotel employees called the Hotel Workers' International Union. Joseph Ettor, a leader of the IWW took charge of the 1912 strike. But when the 1912 strike ultimately failed, the IWW withdrew their support leaving only a select few behind to help lead the Hotel Workers' International Union, mainly Ettor and Elizabeth Gurley Flynn, who led the 1913 New Year's strike for the union.

== Backlash ==
By May 30, 1912, waiters and other hotel workers had left over 17 establishments, including Sherry's, Mouquin's, Vanderbilt, Waldorf, Prince George, Breslin, Rector's, the Hotel Knickerbocker, Bustanoby's, and the Plaza. Hotel owners continued to ignore the demands of the union members, stating that they would only deal with their workers when they came back on their own, without the union. Union members observed that higher-class eating and hotel establishments rarely ever accommodated outside labor organizations. By this time, the Hotel Workers’ International Union was receiving major harassment from the police and media outlets. The Herald is quoted saying, “It is inconceivable that any properly managed establishment could afford to do anything that would place the control of its servants in the hands of an irresponsible union”.

The Hotel Men's Association refused to comply with the demands set by the union. Instead, they imported their labor from neighboring cities and colleges, and also began employing workers of color to fill the void left by the striking hotel workers. The president of the Hotel Men's Association stated that he would close all his hotels before succumbing to the demands of any organization. When union members heard that workers of color were coming to replace their jobs, they became allies with the Colored Waiters’ Association. The Hotel Workers’ International Union told the Hotel Men's Association that if they hired workers of color that they would only join the strike. However, many hotels had already started employing black males, such as the Plaza and the Majestic.

== End of strike ==
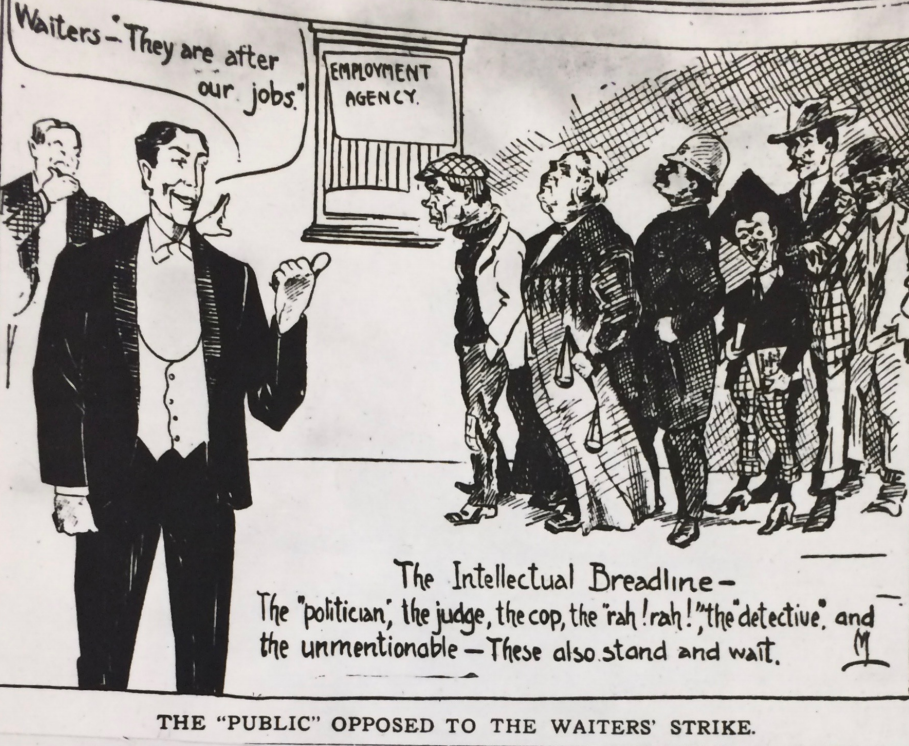
Cartoon criticizes upper-class society for acting as strikebreakers.

May brought the hotel workers' strike to its most rousing numbers, but it quickly began to dwindle in June. Since workers of color and local college students were hired as strikebreakers, many workers feared they would not have a job to return to and went back to the hotels, despite the poor working conditions. On June 11, 1912, the state labor bureau called a meeting between the Hotel Men's Association and the Hotel Workers' International Union to negotiate terms to end the strike, but the Hotel Men's Association ultimately refused to acknowledge them as a union.

The strike ended soon after, on June 25, 1912, after many of the strikers had already gone back to work. Police had been showing brutality against strikers, deterring many from coming back to picket. In addition, management from various hotels had agreed to some of the demands of the union; however, they refused to recognize the union. This brought most of the workers back, to the detriment of the union itself. The more intense strikers found that they did not have a job to go back to since many were blacklisted from the industry. The entire strike, although only lasting from May 7, 1912, to June 25, 1912, cost 117,000 days in lost working time for hotel staff in New York City. This concluded the 1912 strike; however, hotel workers continued to strike in 1913, 1918, 1929, and 1934. Hotel workers did not receive adequate representation until the Hotel Trades Council (now the New York Hotel and Motel Trades Council) was formed in 1938.

== See also ==
- 1853 New York City waiters' strike
