= Joseph James Ettor =

American labor leader

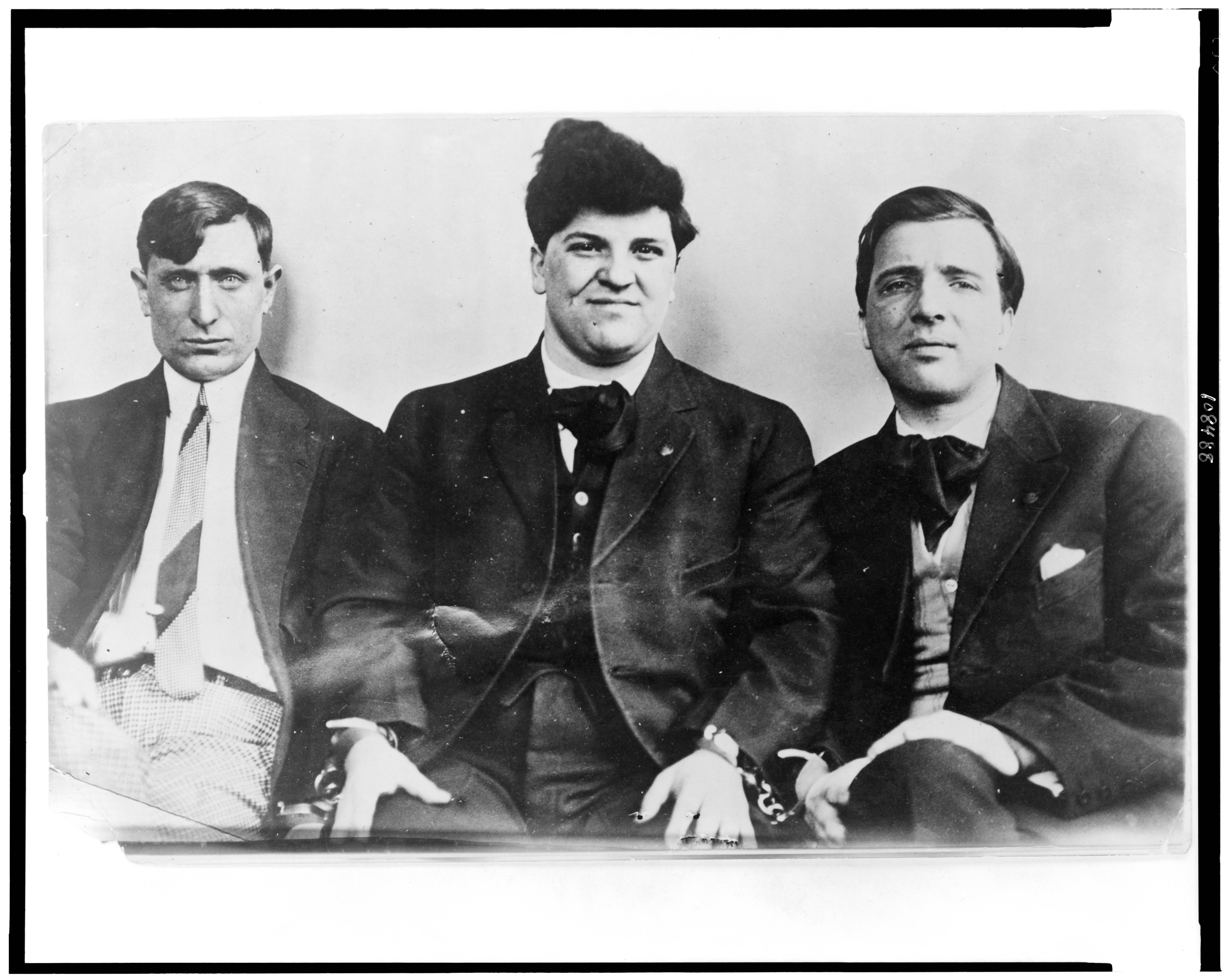
J.J. Ettor (center), flanked by Joseph Caruso and Arturo Giovannitti, his co-defendants in the 1912 Lawrence trial

Signature of Ettor, ca. 1913.

Joseph James "Smiling Joe" Ettor (1885–1948) was an Italian-American trade union organizer who, in the middle-1910s, was one of the leading public faces of the Industrial Workers of the World. Ettor is best remembered as a defendant in a controversial trial related to a killing in the seminal Lawrence Textile Strike of 1912, in which he was acquitted of charges of having been an accessory.

== Biography ==
=== Early years ===
Joseph James Ettor, known to his friends as "Joe" or "Smiling Joe," was born on October 6, 1885, in New York City, the son of a laborer who had emigrated to America from Italy. Ettor went to work at the age of 12 selling newspapers. He later worked as a waterboy on a railroad, as a saw-filer in a lumber mill, as a barrel-maker, as a shipyard worker, and in a cigar factory.

=== Union career ===
Joe Ettor went to work for the Industrial Workers of the World (IWW) in 1906 as an organizer, continuing in that capacity for the next decade. An outstanding and inspirational public speaker who was fluent in Italian and English, Ettor's earliest organizing work on behalf of the IWW took place in the Western United States, where he had worked unionizing miners and migrant laborers. He also had cut his teeth organizing foreign-born workers in the steel mills and shoe factories of the East. Ettor was active in the 1907 lumber strike in Portland, Oregon, the 1909 McKees Rocks Strike and another lesser-known steel strike later that year in Bethlehem, Pennsylvania, a strike of Pennsylvania coal miners in 1909–10, and a Brooklyn shoe factory strike in 1910–11.

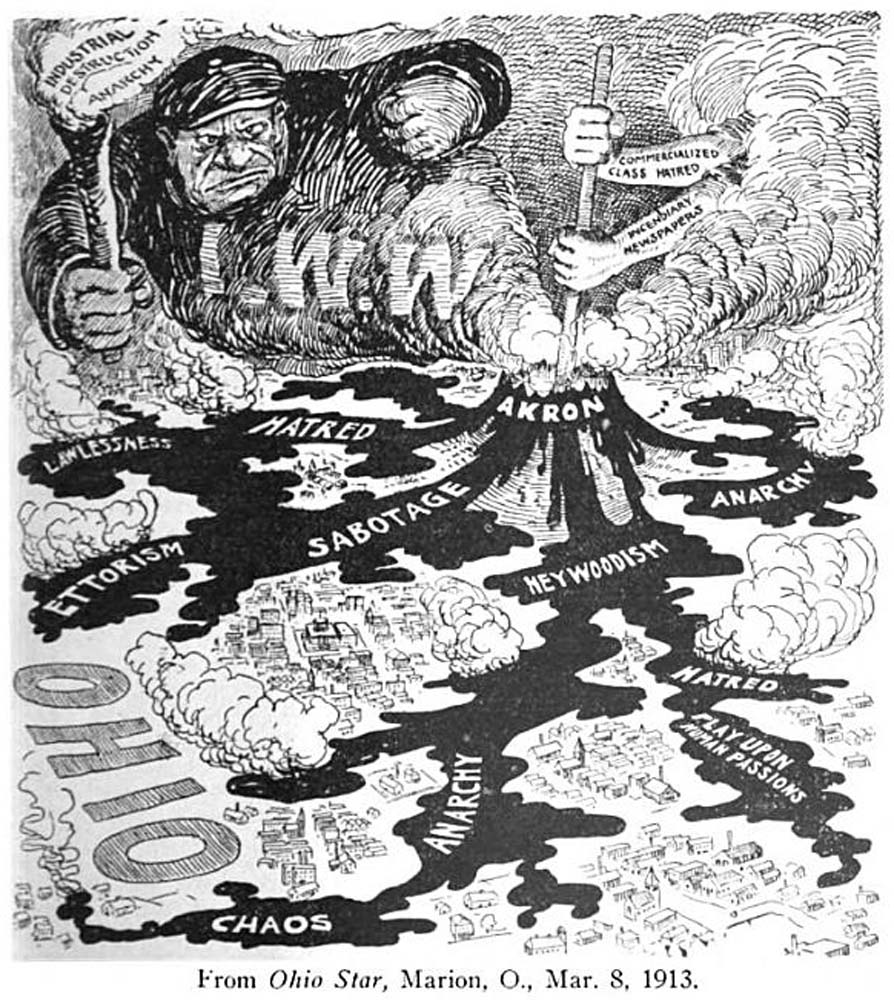
Employers feared "Ettorism". This 1913 anti-union cartoon from The American Employer depicts an IWW organizing drive as "a volcano of hate stirred into active eruption at Akron, by alien hands, which pour into the crater the disturbing acids and alkalis of greed, class hatred and anarchy. From the mouth of the pit rise poisonous clouds of suspicion, malice and envy to pollute the air, while from the cracked and breaking sides of the groaning mountain flow streams of lava of murder, anarchy and destruction, threatening to engulf in their path the fair cities and fertile farms of Ohio."

In 1908, Ettor was named to the governing General Executive Board of the IWW, remaining in that capacity until 1914.

On January 1, 1912, in accordance with a new state law, the textile mills of Lawrence, Massachusetts, posted new rules limiting the hours of workers to 54 a week, down from a standard of 56 previously in effect. It soon became clear that the employers had no intention of adjusting wage rates upwards to compensate for the lost work time, and a strike ensued.

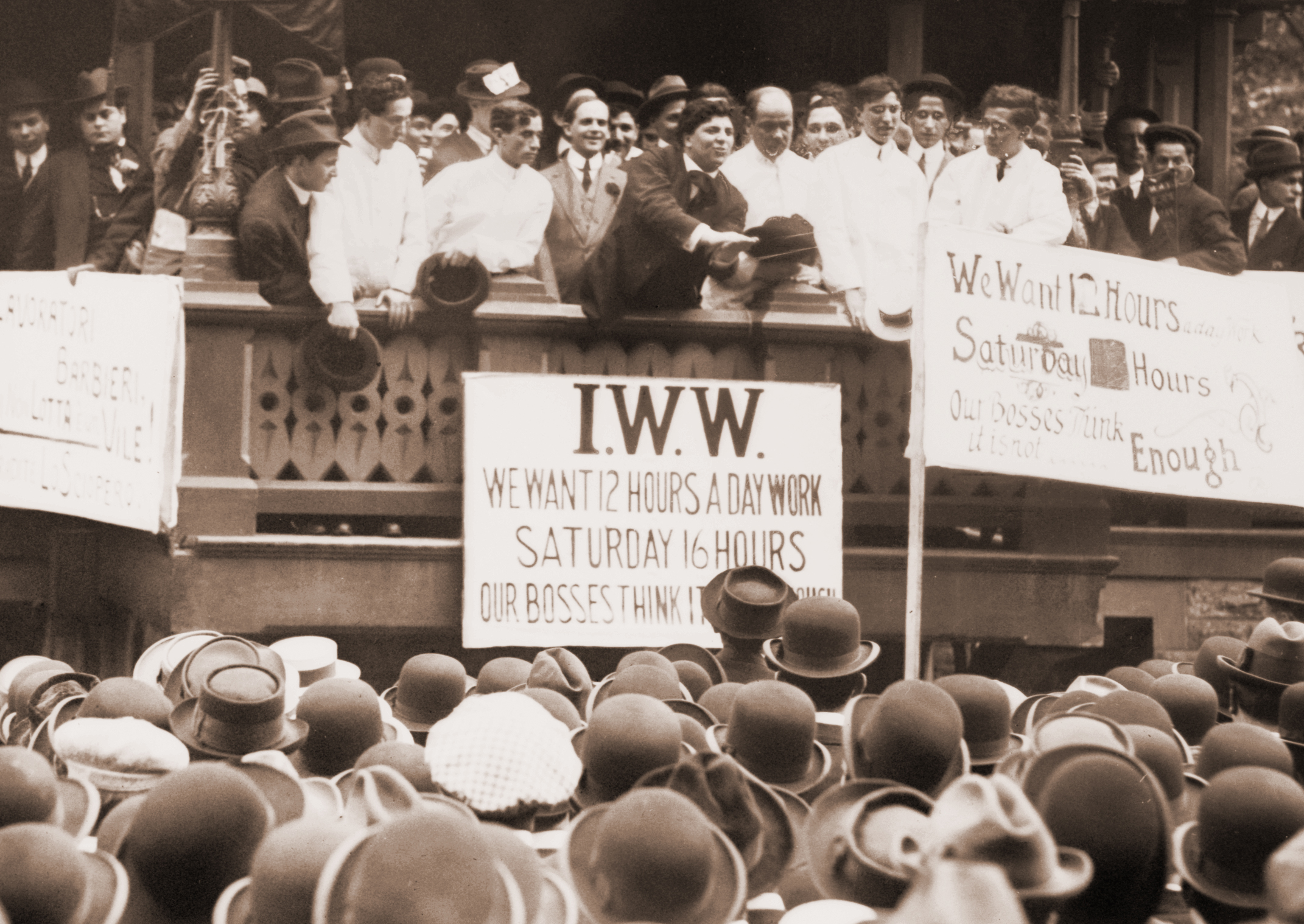
Joe Ettor addresses striking Brooklyn barbers in Union Square, New York City, May 17, 1913.

On January 12, 1912, the Italian language branch of IWW Local 20 decided to send to New York City for Joe Ettor, the organization's top Italian language leader, to come to Lawrence and lead the strike. Ettor arrived with Arturo Giovannitti, secretary of the Italian Socialist Federation, a language federation of the Socialist Party of America and editor of the socialist newspaper Il Proletario [The Proletarian], who was not himself at the time a member of the IWW. Ettor instantly called on all his skills, including his ability to speak five languages, to rally the strikers. On his first afternoon in Lawrence, he addressed thousands of strikers, fostering solidarity and discouraging violence. "All the blood that is spilled in a strike is your blood," he told strikers. Denouncing the mill owners, sympathizing with the toil of textile workers, Ettor called for an even larger walkout. "Monday morning you have got to close the mills that you have caused to shut down, tighter than you have them now." Ettor then set up fourteen strike committees based on nationality, and began meeting daily with everyone from the mayor of Lawrence to the various strikers in committee. Mill owners instantly recognized Ettor's power and tried to discredit him by planting dynamite in a store where he picked up his mail. But the plot was quickly detected and Ettor continued organizing the strike.

During the walkout, which came to be known as the Bread and Roses Strike, IWW striker Anna LoPizzo was shot and killed. Joseph Caruso was charged with the murder and Ettor and Giovannitti, both of whom were giving speeches several miles away from the crime scene, were arrested as accomplices. The three were eventually acquitted in a trial before Salem judge Joseph F. Quinn.

Ettor was one of the leaders of the Waiters strike of 1912 in New York City, and the Brooklyn barbers strike of 1913.

The question of violence was a perennial matter of discussion and debate within the IWW. Some, like Giovannitti, Elizabeth Gurley Flynn, and Vincent St. John, took the position that while the union did not favor violence, it would not shy away from its use if necessary to accomplish the social revolution. Ettor, on the other hand, shared the orientation of "Big Bill" Haywood that the only kind of force to which the organization could lend its name was the use of the general strike for the overthrow of capitalism.

Ettor became a member of the executive council of the IWW. In 1916, he left the IWW along with Flynn after a dispute over the Mesabi range strike.

=== Death and legacy ===
In later years, Ettor ran a fruit orchard in San Clemente, California, where he died in 1948.

== Works ==
- Unionismo industriale e trade-unionismo: Puo' un socialista e industrialista far parte dell' A.F. of L.? : resoconto stenografico del contradittorio tra Joseph J. Ettor ed Arturo Caroti. Debate with Arturo Caroti. Chicago: Industrial Workers of the World, n.d. [1912].
- Industrial Unionism: The Road to Freedom. Chicago : Industrial Workers of the World Pub. Bureau, 1913. —also translated into Swedish.
- Watson, Bruce, Bread and Roses: Mills, Migrants, and The Struggle for the American Dream, Viking, New York, 2005—The only full-length narrative of the 1912 textile strike in Lawrence.

== See also ==
- Lawrence textile strike
