= George Pettibone =

Miner and labor leader

George A. Pettibone
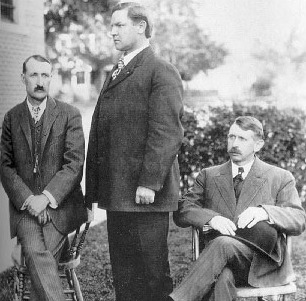
- 1907 photo of (l-r) Charles Moyer, Bill Haywood, and Pettibone
- Born: May 1862; Wellsville, Kansas, US
- Died: August 3, 1908 (age 46); Denver, Colorado, US
- Resting place: Fairmount Cemetery (Denver, Colorado)
- Occupations: Miner, labor leader

George A. Pettibone (May 1862 – August 3, 1908) was an Idaho miner. Pettibone was best known as a defendant in trial of three leaders of the Western Federation of Miners for the 1905 assassination by bombing of Frank Steunenberg, former governor of Idaho.

== Biography ==
Pettibone was convicted of contempt of court and criminal conspiracy in the Coeur d'Alene labor strike of 1892.

He was later implicated in the 1905 assassination of Frank Steunenberg, ex-governor of Idaho, by a confession and testimony from Harry Orchard.

Western Federation of Miners (WFM) general secretary Bill Haywood and WFM president Charles Moyer were also implicated. Haywood was represented by Clarence Darrow, the most renowned defense lawyer of the day, who obtained an acquittal. Pettibone was tried after Haywood, and was defended by Orrin N. Hilton of Denver. Pettibone was also acquitted, and charges against Moyer were dropped.

Pettibone fell ill with cancer during his trial.

After his acquittal he returned home to Denver, Colorado. On August 1, 1908, Pettibone underwent surgery for stomach cancer in Denver. Surgeons pronounced Pettibone terminal following the operation and he died in Denver two days later.

== See also ==
- Charlie Siringo
