= Orrin N. Hilton =

American lawyer

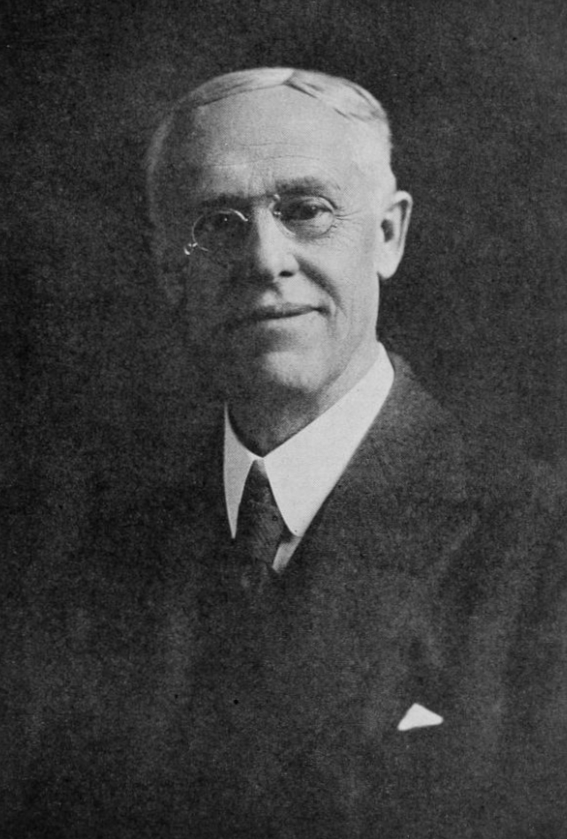
- Born: September 12, 1849; Lowell, Massachusetts, US
- Died: December 16, 1932 (aged 83); Ontario, California, US
- Education: Bates College
- Occupations: Judge, lawyer
- Spouse: Carrie Smolk (m. 1883)

Orrin N. Hilton (1849–1932) was a Denver judge and attorney who participated for the defense in several famous court cases. Judge Hilton successfully defended George Pettibone of the Western Federation of Miners when Pinkerton detective James McParland accused him of conspiracy to murder former Idaho governor Frank Steunenberg.

Hilton also successfully defended Vincent St. John in a murder trial in Telluride, Colorado, arguing that the charges were bogus, outdated, and had been prompted by the Mine Owners' Association and the Citizens' Alliance for purposes of revenge against the union organizer.

== Biography ==
Orrin N. Hilton was born in Lowell, Massachusetts on September 12, 1849. He earned a bachelor's degree from Bates College in 1871. He was admitted to the Michigan bar in 1874.

He married Carrie Smolk on May 23, 1883.

Hilton was called upon in a general advisory capacity in the Massachusetts murder trial of Joseph Ettor and Arturo Giovannitti, organizers for the Industrial Workers of the World (IWW), who were charged (and acquitted) in the death of IWW striker Anna LoPizzo during the Lawrence Textile Strike.

Hilton played a role in the trial of miners accused of murder in Minnesota, a case which resulted in organizers Elizabeth Gurley Flynn and Joseph Ettor being expelled from the Industrial Workers of the World for putting the freedom of imprisoned organizers above the rights of the miners they were organizing.

Hilton became involved with the case of Joe Hill, a Swedish-American laborer who was accused of murder in Utah on highly circumstantial grounds. Hilton was contacted early, but was unable to travel to Utah to participate in the defense at trial. After Hill's conviction, Hilton participated in the appeal process to the Utah Supreme Court a year later with Soren Christensen, in May 1915. The appeal was denied. Hilton also made Hill's case before a Pardon Board afterward, but the attempt to get a commutation of sentence was also unsuccessful. Hilton was involved in an attempt to get federal attention to the Hill case, working with the Swedish minister to the United States August Ekengren to attempt to get President Wilson to intervene. While a stay of execution was provided, the efforts were ultimately unsuccessful, and Hill was executed. The state took various reprisals against those who had defended Hill's rights, and Hilton was disbarred from practicing law in the state of Utah afterward, on the grounds of a speech he gave at Joe Hill's funeral.

Orrin N. Hilton died from a heart attack in Ontario, California on December 16, 1932.
