= Sherman Bell =

American army commander

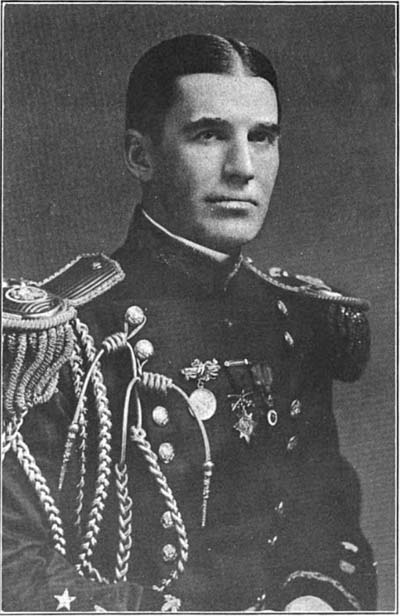
General Sherman Bell. Photo from The Pinkerton Labor Spy, published in 1907. His uniform was custom made, with gold lace, cords, and tassels at an estimated cost of a thousand dollars.

Adjutant General Sherman M. Bell (1866 or 1867 – January 9, 1942) was a controversial leader of the Colorado National Guard during the Colorado Labor Wars of 1903–04. While Bell received high praise from Theodore Roosevelt and others, he was vilified as a tyrant by members of the Western Federation of Miners (WFM).

Sherman Bell, a former deputy United States marshal in Cripple Creek, Colorado, participated in the Spanish–American War as one of Roosevelt's Rough Riders. General Bell was active in the Masonic Order and the Order of Elks, and was honored by the Knights of Pythias. A former hardrock mine manager, Bell took the side of the Mine Owners' Association against the strikers during a strike of smelter workers, which ultimately included the miners of the Cripple Creek District.

== Early years ==
Sherman Bell was born on a farmstead in Douglas County, Illinois, near Newman. He became a deputy United States marshal, and enlisted with the Rough Riders at the outbreak of the Spanish–American War.

== Persona ==
Much of the history written about Sherman Bell has to do with his characteristics, his attitude, and his affectations. William MacLeod Raine spent some time interviewing Bell in 1904, and concluded that Bell, filled with "cocksureness",

...sums up [any situation], largely regardless of the evidence, and comes to an immediate decision. He is one of the most unfettered of men. It is a safe guess that deep down in his heart he does not care one jackstraw for abstract law. He decides what course is best to follow and the legality of it does not trouble him at all. [Bell is not] in the least open-minded, his opinion is unchangeable... Furthermore, he does not value criticism in the least.

Raine said that Bell was "entirely devoid of humor", and "I have never seen him smile except when he was telling how he had hammered the Western Federation."

In 1998 J. Anthony Lukas wrote,

If his campaigns against the federation sometimes took the guise of a holy war, Sherman Bell readily attributed its direction to the sacred trinity of "Me, God, and Governor Peabody." Whatever his military skills—and they were often called into question—Bell had a knack for vivid expression.

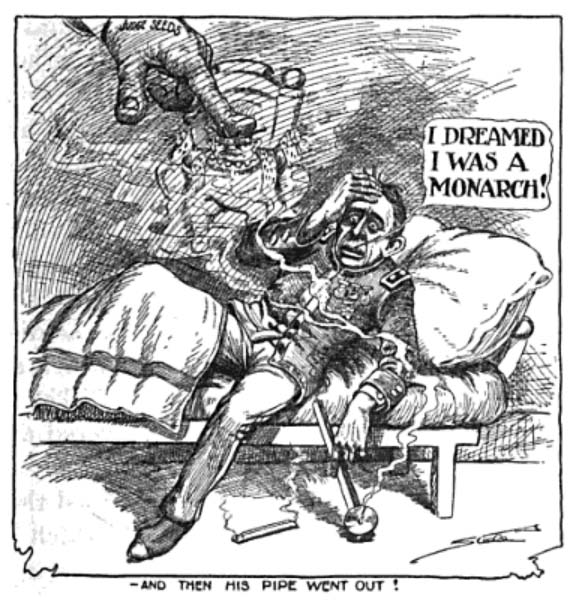
Cartoon of General Sherman Bell. caption reads "COLORADO'S GREAT WAR CHIEF". In the cartoon, General Bell repeatedly refers to Governor Peabody as "His Excellency the Governor of Colorado" and the "Commander in Chief".

General Bell was direct about his purpose: "I came to do up this damned anarchistic federation." Bell justified the ensuing reign of terror as a "military necessity, which recognizes no laws, either civil or social."

Benjamin Rastall said of Bell,

He returned to Colorado [from the Spanish–American War] to be hailed as a popular hero for a time, but soon lost the admiration of the public through his overbearing ways and self-conceit... his idea seemed to have been to make the most gorgeous military display possible, and to give himself the largest notoriety as a military leader.

According to Lukas, Sherman Bell's uniform was custom made, with gold lace, cords, and tassels at an estimated cost of a thousand dollars. But on occasion he was also known to wear "an old battered campaign hat, a black shirt, and a rag of a tie."

At least one writer was impressed with Sherman Bell. Weston Arthur Goodspeed wrote in 1904,

[During the Colorado Labor Wars] one figure towered above the discord, strode boldly into the strife, met anarchy more than half way and compelled it to meet him, fight and be quelled, or chased away in arrant fear. It was Brig. Gen. Sherman M. Bell, adjutant general of the Colorado National Guard, who, with patience that was marvelous in a man of his high mettle, with judgment rare in one just past thirty and with courage which no soldier of any age has excelled, stamped out the nest of vipers that had fastened deadly fangs on the richest mining community in the world, drove the assassins from the State, preserved the lives and property of honest citizens and restored law and order to a section of the State which, for years, had writhed beneath the oppression of groundless malice and envious ignorance...

Goodspeed declared Bell world-famous, "the most successful opposer of strikes that this or any other country has ever produced." Bell was also "ruggedly strong" with a "trim and soldierly figure" and a "well shaped head" featuring an "almost boyish ... expression, and yet, commanding in every feature, from the square, firm chin, the straight line of the lips and the strong, Grecian nose". Bell is "humane, as well as brave; kindly and at the same time chivalrous. Should one of his men be ill, no matter what his station in the Guard, it is General Bell who is the first to administer aid..."

According to Goodspeed, the Colorado militia had been "a mere handful, of three hundred or more willing but untrained troopers" whom Bell turned into "one of the best organized, the best drilled and the most loyal and able bodies of military men to be found outside the regular army." Goodspeed attributed to President Theodore Roosevelt the statement, "I never saw such resolution as Sherman Bell displayed. If I had a regiment and could have only one man in it, that man would be Sherman Bell."

Describing Sherman Bell's exploits with the Rough Riders in Cuba, Goodspeed stated that Bell "shared valiantly in the distinguished services of that great command." According to someone who was actually there, Bell was suffering from a hernia, and "limped through the jungles and across the hills most of the time, but always seemed to stay up with the troops despite the pain." While Bell performed "splendid service" according to future president Theodore Roosevelt, most of fellow soldier Billy McGinty's published recollection describes a difficult trip to transport an ailing Sherman Bell to the rear aboard a small two-wheeled cart pulled by a mule. When McGinty saw Bell again, Bell was with a lady whom he told "a line of bull" about the Cuban experience, apparently exaggerating McGinty's role in saving his life.

Raine observed that Bell's "reckless irresponsibility is a continual thorn in the side of his superiors." When Theodore Roosevelt was campaigning for Vice-President in 1900, "Bell enrolled himself promptly as his bodyguard." After Roosevelt spoke in the Victor town hall, some boisterous miners seemed to Bell to show insufficient respect. Bell was described as having "blood in his eye", and "a very lively time ensued." The miners followed the party to Roosevelt's special train, and some of them were flinging stones. Roosevelt stepped from inside the rail car to the rear platform where Bell was confronting the miners, and Bell pushed him back inside. Roosevelt was irritated with the confrontation between Bell and the miners and sharply ordered, "As your superior officer, Lieutenant Bell, I order you inside." While Bell saluted and complied, he immediately began organizing the party inside the train, telling them to "shoot if any of the mob [throw] stones..." When someone objected that shedding blood would damage Roosevelt's campaign, Bell curtly replied, "I'm not running the campaign. I'm maintaining order just now in Victor." Roosevelt later told newspaper correspondents that his "principle fear in that distressing hour was that Sherman Bell would begin killing people."

== Deputy days ==
As deputy sheriff (other accounts say deputy marshal) in El Paso County, Sherman Bell once used a thirty-eight Smith & Wesson pistol to shoot out the lights in a dance hall in Independence, Colorado, so that three bullion thieves could be arrested.

== Colorado Labor Wars ==
In 1903, the WFM called a strike of smeltermen in the Colorado Springs, Colorado, area, which was extended to Cripple Creek. Colorado National Guard leaders imported a thousand Krag–Jørgensen rifles and sixty thousand rounds of ammunition were sent to the district.

As Brigadier General of the Guard, Sherman Bell, a former manager of the Smith-Moffat mining interests in the Cripple Creek District, had a conflict of interest: in addition to his state salary, he received $3,200 annual incentive pay from the mine owners.

George Suggs observed,

Using force and intimidation to shut off debate about the advisability of the state's intervention, Brigadier General John Chase, Bell's field commander, systematically imprisoned without formal charges union officials and others who openly questioned the need for troops. Included among those jailed were a justice of the peace, the Chairman of the Board of County Commissioners, and a member of the WFM who had criticized the guard and advised the strikers not to return to the mines.

Suggs continued,

So frequently were individuals placed in the military stockade or "bull pen" at Goldfield for reasons of "military necessity" and for "talking too much" in support of the strike that the Cripple Creek Times of September 15 advised its readers not to comment on the strike situation. Not even the newspapers escaped harassment. When the Victor Daily Record, a strong voice of the WFM, erroneously charged that one of the soldiers was an ex-convict, its staff was imprisoned before a retraction could be published.

On September 10 the National Guard began "a series of almost daily arrests" of union officers and men known to be strongly in sympathy with the unions. When District Judge W. P. Seeds of Teller County held a hearing on writs of habeas corpus for four union men held in the stockade, Sherman Bell's response was caustic. "Habeas corpus be damned," he declared, "we'll give 'em post mortems." Approximately ninety cavalrymen entered Cripple Creek and surrounded the courthouse. The prisoners were escorted into the courtroom by a company of infantry equipped with loaded rifles and fixed bayonets, and the soldiers remained standing in a line during the court sessions. Other soldiers took up sniper positions and set up a gatling gun in front of the courthouse. Angered by the intimidating display, an attorney for the prisoners refused to proceed and left the court. Undaunted after several days of such displays, the judge ruled for the prisoners. Judge Seeds commented in his closing remarks,

I trust that there will never again be such an unseemly and unnecessary intrusion of armed soldiers in the halls and about the entrances of American Courts of Justice. They are intrusions that can only tend to bring this court into contempt, and make doubtful the boasts of that liberty that is the keynote of American Government.

Colorado National Guard General John Chase. The caption reads: ADJUTANT-GENERAL JOHN CHASE The Denver oculist in command of the National Guard. General Chase was a brigadier-general in the Cripple Creek strike, and no love is lost between him and the labor men.

Yet General Chase, acting in conjunction with General Bell, refused to release the men until Governor Peabody ordered him to do so.

Even those Colorado newspapers which had supported the intervention expressed concern that court orders were not being obeyed by the National Guard. The Rocky Mountain News editorialized,

Adjutant General Sherman Bell should be relieved and removed from command of the troops at Cripple Creek. His mental characteristics are such as to make him an unsafe and even dangerous person to hold that position. This has been shown by his conduct since he went to the district in his disregard of the law and the most ordinary rights of citizens.

The Denver Post opined,

...the real reason [for the National Guard deployment] at Cripple Creek is that the governor proposes to crush the miners' strike.

In Cripple Creek the thing at which Peabody has struck with all the power of the state is not physical, as in Chicago, but in the air. That is to say, men said they were afraid to go to work; but there were no criminal acts. The governor's excuse for his action is that he levels the armed force of the state against fear. To the man who cares nothing, sympathetically, one way or the other, but who has a regard for law, the view of the matter is that the governor should have refused to act until there was evident lawlessness and disorder.

The Army and Navy Journal weighed in, observing that the Colorado National Guard had been placed,

...in the relation of hired men to the mine operators and [the arrangement] morally suspended their function of state military guardians of the public peace. It was a rank perversion of the whole theory and purpose of the National Guard, and more likely to incite disorder than prevent it.

The Colorado Constitution of the period "declares that the military shall always be in strict subordination to the civil power." The district court ruled that Bell and Chase should be arrested for violating the law. Bell responded by declaring that no civil officer would be allowed to serve civil processes to any National Guard officer on duty.

Within a week after the arrival of troops, the Findlay, Strong, Elkton, Tornado, Thompson, Ajax, Shurtloff, and Golden Cycle mines began operations again, and replacement workers they had recruited were "practically forced" to go to work. The mine owners recruited from surrounding states, telling the potential miners that there was no strike. Emil Peterson, a worker recruited from Duluth, decided to run when he realized the purpose of the military escort. Lieutenant Hartung fired a pistol at him as he ran away. A warrant issued for the lieutenant's arrest was ignored by the military officers.

The Cripple Creek Mine Owners' Association (CCMOA) began to pressure companies to fire union miners who were still working in mines that had not been struck. Companies that refused to do so, or who in some other way refused to join the employers' alliance movement, were blacklisted. When the Woods Investment Company ordered their employees to quit the WFM, the employees joined the strike instead. The superintendent and the shift bosses accompanied all of the workers out the door.

On November 21, two management employees at the Vindicator mine were killed by an explosion at the 600 foot level. The coroner's jury could not determine what had caused the explosion. Although the mine was heavily guarded by soldiers and no unauthorized personnel were permitted to approach, the CCMOA blamed the explosion on the WFM. Fifteen strike leaders were arrested but were never prosecuted because evidence of their involvement never materialized.

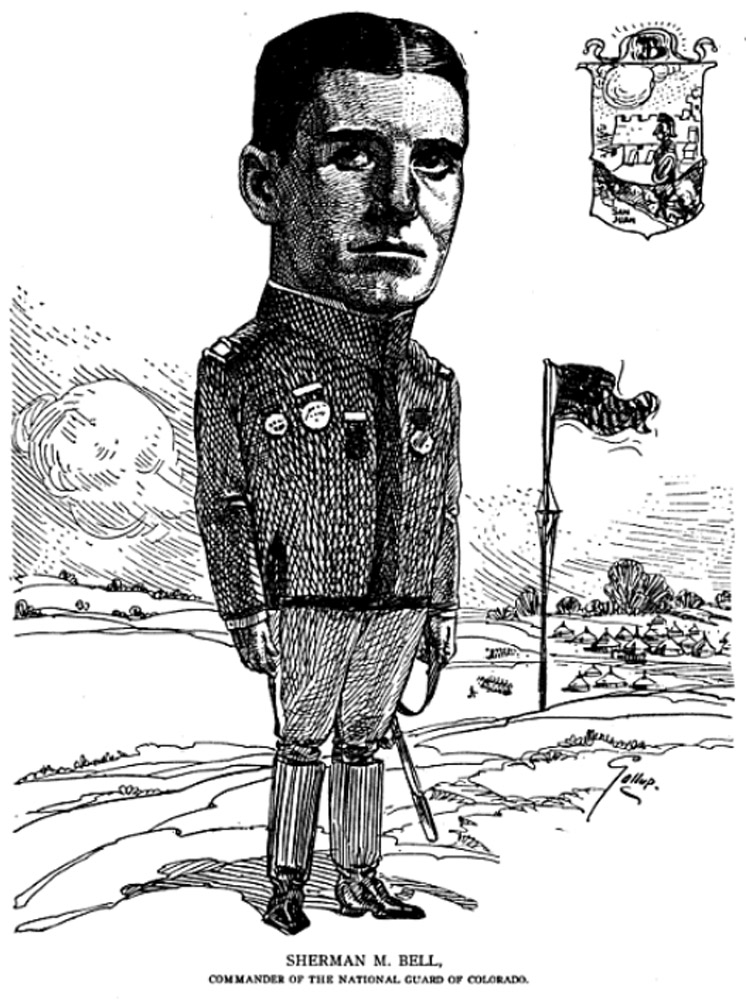
1904 caricature of Colorado General Sherman Bell produced by B. S. White of American Cartoonist magazine

The union blamed the employers for the Vindicator mine explosion, claiming it was just another devious plot that went wrong. That incident and the apparent efforts to wreck a train raised tensions and provoked rumors throughout the Cripple Creek District. It was said that a shadowy vigilante organization called the Committee of 40, which was composed of "known 'killers' and the 'best' citizens," was formed to uphold law and order. The miners were said to have formed a "Committee of Safety" in response, for they feared that the Committee of 40 planned acts of violence that could be blamed on the WFM, thus creating a pretext for the union's destruction. The National Guard stepped up its harassment, and began arresting children who chided the soldiers. On December 4, 1903, the governor proclaimed that Teller County was in a "state of insurrection and rebellion" and he declared martial law.

Sherman Bell immediately announced that "the military will have sole charge of everything..." The governor seemed embarrassed at Bell's public interpretation of the decree and tried to soften the public perception. Bell was undeterred; within weeks, the National Guard suspended the Bill of Rights. Union leaders were arrested and either thrown in the bullpen, or banished. Prisoners who won habeas corpus cases were released in court and then immediately re-arrested. The Victor Daily Record was placed under military censorship, and all WFM-friendly information was prohibited. Freedom of assembly was not allowed. The right to bear arms was suspended—citizens were required to give up their firearms and their ammunition. An attorney who dared the Guard to come and get his guns found himself confronting soldiers and was shot in the arm. On January 7, 1904, the Guard criminalized "loitering or strolling about, frequenting public places where liquor is sold, begging or leading an idle, immoral, or profligate course of life, or not having any visible means of support."

Francis J. Ellison, a commissioned officer of the Colorado National Guard, was assigned by General Sherman Bell to the Cripple Creek District for "special military duty". Although Ellison acquired "certain evidence in regard to the perpetrators of the Vindicator explosion," which "would have led to the arrest and conviction of the men who are responsible for the placing of that infernal machine," Sherman Bell failed to follow up on that evidence.

On January 26, 1904, a cage full of non-union miners broke from the hoist at the Independence mine, and fifteen men fell to their deaths. The coroner's jury found that management was negligent, having failed to install safety equipment properly, and the hoisting engineer responsible for the men's lives, who was hired as a replacement worker, was inexperienced.

[T]he employer had taken the man's word – nothing more – as to his qualifications. The engineer involved in the fatal accident, however, had been recommended by a former employer.

The WFM echoed the accusation about negligence, while management claimed the WFM had tampered with the lift, in spite of the union having no access to the militarized property. Reportedly 168 men quit the mine.

About the middle of February, 1904, leadership of the Colorado National Guard became concerned that the Mine Owners were failing to finance the occupation by covering the payroll of the soldiers. General Reardon ordered Major Ellison to take another soldier he could trust to "hold up or shoot the men coming off shift at the Vindicator mine" in order to convince the mine owners to pay. Major Ellison believed that the miners took a route out of the mine that would not make ambush possible. Reardon ordered Ellison to pursue an alternative plan, which was shooting up one of the mines. Major Ellison and Sergeant Gordon Walter fired sixty shots from their revolvers into the Vindicator and Lillie shaft house. The plan worked, and the mine owners paid up. Ellison would later testify (in October 1904) that General Reardon informed him General Sherman Bell and Governor Peabody knew about the plan.

Major Ellison, who had been under the leadership of Adjutant General Sherman Bell, testified in October 1904 about one of Bell's policies,

At about the 20th of January, 1904, by order of the adjutant of Teller County military district, and under special direction of Major T. E. McClelland and General F. M. Reardon, who was the Governor's confidential adviser regarding the conditions in that district, a series of street fights were commenced between men of Victor and soldiers of the National Guard on duty there. Each fight was planned by General Reardon or Major McClelland and carried out under their actual direction. Major McClelland's instructions were literally to knock them down, knock their teeth down their throats, bend in their faces, kick in their ribs and do everything except kill them. These fights continued more or less frequently up to the 22d of March.

Thomas McClellend, one of Bell's two junior officers in charge of the beatings of striking miners, had previously been quoted, "To hell with the constitution, we aren't going by the constitution."

On March 12, troops occupied the WFM's Union Hall in Victor. Merchants were arrested for displaying union posters. Then the CCMOA began pressuring employers inside and outside the district to fire union miners, issuing and requiring a "non-union card" to work in the area, while the WFM took counter-measures to limit the impact.

In spite of all the repression, only 300 of the original 3,500 strikers had returned to work as scabs. The rest of the miners had not repudiated their leadership, as the CCMOA had expected. There was evidence that the non-union mine operators were paying a heavy price for their actions, and the union believed that it was winning the strike.

On March 28, 1904, WFM President Moyer was arrested,

...on the rather flimsy excuse of having desecrated the American flag. The real reason for his detention was the fact that his speeches and his presence were believed to have an inflammatory effect on the heated strikers. The courts ordered the release of Moyer, but though it fairly rained writs of habeas corpus, General Bell shed them as a duck does water.

The Colorado Supreme Court intervened, and Bell stated that if the court didn't see things his way, then he would simply ignore their ruling. A writ subsequently filed with the United States Supreme Court on Moyer's behalf alleged, in part, that "said Sherman Bell and the said Buckley Wells loudly and boastfully, through the public press and otherwise, threatened the destruction and death of anyone who should interfere or attempt to interfere with them by the service of said writ", that "said Sherman Bell and the said Buckley Wells did call to their aid and assistance the members of the National Guard", and that the "Sheriff is powerless to execute the order of the court ... by calling to his aid a posse for the reason that the force under the control of the said Bell and the said Wells and the said Governor of the State of Colorado is vastly greater than any force which the said Sheriff could command."

On June 6, 1904, there was a horrific explosion at the Independence Depot. Thirteen non-union men were killed — some of them mutilated — and six more were injured. Sheriff Robertson rushed to the scene, roped off the area, and began an investigation.

The district split into opposing camps based upon whether the WFM was presumed innocent or guilty.

Immediately after the explosion, the CCMOA and the Citizens' Alliance met at Victor's Military Club in the Armory and plotted the removal of all civil authorities that they did not control. Their first target was Sheriff Robertson. When he declined to resign immediately, they fired several shots, produced a rope, and gave him the choice of resignation or immediate lynching. He resigned. The mine owners replaced him with a man who was a member of the CCMOA and of the Citizens' Alliance. In the next few days the CCMOA and the Citizens' Alliance forced more than thirty local officials to resign, and replaced them with enemies of the WFM.

Then ignoring the objections of the county commissioners, the employers called a town meeting directly across the street from the WFM Union Hall in Victor. The city marshal of Victor deputized about a hundred deputies to stop the meeting, but Victor Mayor French, an ally of the mine owners, fired the marshal. An angry crowd of several thousand gathered, and anti-union speeches were made by members of the CCMOA. Rastall records,

C. C. Hamlin [secretary of the Mine Owners' Association] mounted an empty wagon, and began a speech which from the first became violent, unrestrained, with judgment and caution thrown to the winds, of a kind that could not but arouse to frenzy men whose passions were already deeply stirred... [He declared that] the people should take the law into their own hands... A single shot was fired. Then there came a fusilade of shots... men were seen to draw their revolvers and fire simply at random into the crowd... Five men lay on the ground, two of them fatally wounded... The wonder is that twenty men were not killed instead of two.

Fifty union miners left the scene to cross the street to the union hall.

Company L of the National Guard, a detachment from Victor that was commanded by a mine manager, surrounded the WFM building, took up sniper positions on nearby rooftops, and began to fire volley after volley into the union hall. Four miners were hit, and the men inside were forced to surrender. The Citizens' Alliance and their allies then wrecked the hall, wrecked all other WFM halls in the district, and looted four WFM cooperative stores. The Victor Daily Record workforce was again arrested. The day of the explosion, all mine owners, managers, and superintendents were deputized. Groups of soldiers, sheriff's deputies, and citizens roamed the district, looking for union members. Approximately 175 people — union men, sympathizers, city officials — were locked into outdoor bullpens in Victor, Independence, and Goldfield. Food requirements were ignored until the Women's Auxiliary was eventually allowed to feed the men.

On June 7, the day after the explosion, the Citizens' Alliance set up kangaroo courts and deported 38 union members. General Sherman Bell arrived with instructions to legalize the process of deportation. He "tried" 1,569 union prisoners. More than 230 were judged guilty — meaning they refused to renounce the union — and were loaded onto special trains and dumped across the state line. For all practical purposes, in a matter of days the Western Federation of Miners had been destroyed in Colorado's mining camps.

In an interview, Sherman Bell was asked the reason for the deportations. He replied that "It is a military necessity. They are men against whom crimes cannot be specified, but their presence is regarded as dangerous to law and order."

Feminist singer-songwriter Nancy Vogl's 1986 song "Oh, America" recounts the story of the Labor Wars, portraying Bell as "the devil himself in a fashion."

=== United Mine Workers strike ===
The United Mine Workers of America, attempting to organize the Colorado northern and southern fields, called a strike in 1903. Adjutant General Sherman Bell was given jurisdiction over this strike as well. The Colorado National Guard took the side of the mine owners against the miners. In one example of this partisanship,

Major Zeph T. Hill was appointed commander of the militia in Las Animas County, with headquarters at Trinidad... Curfew was established and enforced. No person was allowed on the streets after 9 o'clock in the evening. The coal miners were photographed like notorious criminals, by the Bertillon system. Eighty strikers at Berwind, who objected to being thus humiliated, were marched by a detail of cavalry for twenty miles to Trinidad, in a scorching hot sun, where sufficient force was available to photograph and register these men according to the Bertillon system. The men were given nothing to eat or drink on the road, and one man who fell by the road-side was left lying in the sun. This event occurred on May 19th, 1904.

== Bell has second thoughts ==
With elections approaching, three prominent Republicans went to see Adjutant General Sherman Bell about deporting miners, expressing concerns that his actions would hurt the Republican party's election chances. Bell responded, "To Hell with the party. I'm not breaking up this lawlessness in the interests of any party." However, this behind the scenes disagreement would boil over into a public flap. There had been several misunderstandings with Governor Peabody during the occupation of Colorado's mining districts, and once again Bell went to the media declaring,

I shall resign the office of adjutant general probably Monday, and by the 1st of July there will be another man in my place. I don't approve of using the militia of the State to help any political movement, and I object, whether it is in a positive or negative way. I am accused of using or attempting to use the military in the late campaign. This is false, but the corporations used the militia for their purposes and instead of the militia being used to protect the people and uphold the law, that force was actually degraded to the uses of the local corporations who connived at the breaking of the law.

I was about to call [the State troops] to Denver last week [for a required practice]. It did not strike me at that time that any political significance could be attached to the movement. Finally there was talk of a riot in Denver, and that the Republican party was to call upon the mayor and governor for troops. I was in Denver at the time and told the governor it would be a happy coincidence to have the troops in this vicinity in case of trouble, and he agreed with me. I was about to issue the order for mobilization when I began to see that politics was entering into the game.

Mayor Wright asked me to meet him Saturday night at his office in the City Hall. He declared it necessary to have the troops out for election day, and wanted to confer with me at 8 o'clock that night. I went to the hall and was astonished that the mayor failed to show up, and that in his place was his secretary and the governor's private secretary. I did not talk to them, but left, feeling convinced that some mysterious work was going on.

I found last Sunday that there were many familiar faces upon the streets of the lower part of town, and that they were of the worst type of men in the West. I then discovered that the corporations had sent out all over the West and brought them here. I thought then more than ever that the militia ought probably to be in the vicinity of Denver in case of trouble, but imagine my surprise when I was given orders on Sunday night by the Governor not to call out a single man and to abandon my plan of assembling the troops for practice.

It was then that I became convinced the military was to be used, not to enforce the law and to protect property, but to encourage trouble by refusing to assemble troops. I protested, but it made no difference. In a mysterious way and in the twinkling of an eye the whole plan was changed. I had to interrupt my military duty and plan because the very assembling of troops for any purpose was feared.

"The very men whom we used the militia to protect in the mining camps were imported—the all-round bad men [that I ran out of their camps]— were hired to break the law in Denver and carry the election in their interests by the corporations.

I am sick of the whole thing, and I will hand in my resignation, probably Monday, to go into effect as soon as I can clean up department business, which will not be later than July 1.

Governor Peabody replied to General Bell's complaints on May 23, 1904:

I saw the papers were full of gossip about the necessity of mobilizing the militia for the city election. I saw several petitions printed in the papers purporting to be addressed to me by the Honest Election League and other independent political organizations, but I never received any formal application for troops. Riots cannot be anticipated. When they come action should be quick. I knew that eight companies of the National Guard in Denver, with artillery and cavalry, could be in the field two hours after any call for their services. I was satisfied to let it go at that. The good citizens of Denver seemed to be of the same mind, for they did not urge me to any other policy.

A union source concluded, in part,

General Bell ... did not hesitate to use his high office for the purpose of intimidating and imprisoning those who were striving for decency and common rights. His present attitude in exposing a portion of Colorado's shame without doubt may be attributed to personal motives rather than a high regard for the liberties of the people and the honor of his State, and from him we may expect only the information that is made public when rascals fall out.

== Venezuela, Mexico, or New Mexico? ==
In a bitterly disputed 1904 election, Governor Peabody was persuaded by his own party to withdraw, and Sherman Bell was destined to lose his military commission. In 1905 the Los Angeles Daily Herald editorialized that,

...General Sherman Bell, the bumptious warrior of Colorado, "may go to Venezuela as an aggressive agent of the American government." The Venezuelans are a bad lot, generally speaking, but they hardly deserve the infliction mentioned.

Bell was reported by the New York Times to have stated the command of the army of Venezuela seemed preferable to other options which he had been offered, which included management of a mine in Mexico, or the governorship of New Mexico (which, in Bell's words, he could have if he wants it). Bell was quoted by the New York Times,

If I went to South America I would probably stay there the rest of my natural days and boss those greasers. If I went to Mexico I would probably stay there a while. If I took a good Federal appointment I would be right here all the time. But I may go to Venezuela after all. It's a fine country, and there are untold opportunities there for a hustler.

I personally do not want to fight against Roosevelt, for I know what kind of a man I would be going up against. I am going to wait a while before I decide, but I may take it, after all.

One union publication speculated that Bell was exploring options outside Colorado because,

The collapse of military rule follows the downfall of [Governor] Peabody, and Bell disappears as a spectacular figure in the turbulence and lawlessness of the gold fields... Not a unionist in Colorado but is Bell's enemy, and he will leave for Mexico to take charge of a mine... Colorado will not be the safest spot on earth henceforth for Sherman Bell.

== Later years ==
In 1910, Sherman Bell promoted a Wild West Show charity event for Spanish–American War veterans at Union Stockyards Stadium in Denver. Bell was reportedly furious when, after the show was over, thirty six-shooters belonging to the state were not returned by cowboys participating in the event.

He died at Fitzsimons General Hospital in Denver on January 9, 1942, at age 75.

== See also ==
- Mining in the United States
