= Bread and Roses =

Political slogan

Photograph of the 1912 Lawrence textile strike which is closely associated with the slogan today. "As we come marching, marching, in the beauty of the day, A million darkened kitchens, a thousand mill-lofts gray Are touched with all the radiance that a sudden sun discloses, For the people hear us singing: Bread and Roses! Bread and Roses!" –The first stanza of Oppenheim's poem.

"Bread and Roses" is a political slogan associated with women's suffrage and the labor movement; it is also the title of a related poem and song. The earliest known mention of the phrase is in 1911 by American women's suffrage activist Helen Todd; she explained the symbolism as: "Bread, which is home, shelter and security, and the Roses of life, music, education, nature and books".

Todd's phrase inspired the title of the poem "Bread and Roses" by James Oppenheim. The poem was first published in The American Magazine in December 1911, with the attribution line "'Bread for all, and Roses, too'—a slogan of the women in the West." The poem has been translated into other languages and has been set to music by at least three composers.

The phrase is commonly associated with the textile strike in Lawrence, Massachusetts, between January and March 1912, now often referred to as the "Bread and Roses strike." The slogan pairing bread and roses, appealing for both fair wages and dignified working conditions, found resonance as transcending the "sometimes tedious struggles for marginal economic advances" in the "light of labor struggles as based on striving for dignity and respect", as American sociologist and activist Robert J. S. Ross wrote in 2013.

== History ==
=== Women's suffrage ===
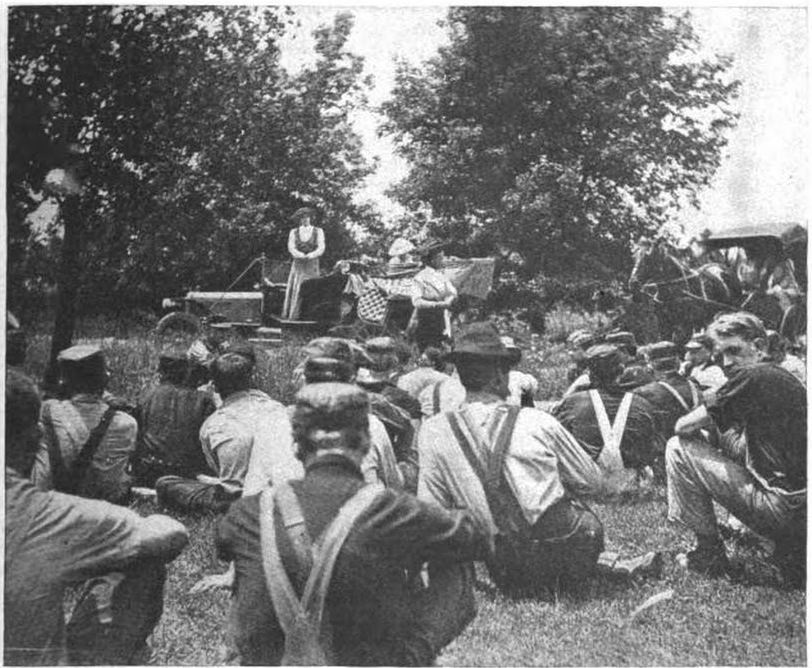
Helen Todd and her colleagues campaign for women's suffrage. Todd, as a factory inspector, discussed how the right to vote would gain for working women and society "bread and roses"–referring to greater income, and life's roses.

The first mention of the phrase and its meaning appears in The American Magazine in September 1911. Helen Todd describes in an article how a group of women from the Chicago Women's Club, after listening to advice from Senator Robert La Follette, decided to initiate an automobile campaign around the state of Illinois for the right of women to vote in June 1910. The women who made up the first automobile campaign were Catherine McCulloch, a lawyer and justice of the peace; Anna Blount, a physician and surgeon; Kate Hughes, a minister; Helen Todd, a state factory inspector; and Jennie Johnson, a singer.

Each speaker was assigned a subject in which they were an expert. McCulloch gave a record of the votes of the representatives and senators to their home constituents. Blount's subject was taxation without representation as concerns women. Hughes gave her speech on the history of the women's suffrage movement. Johnson opened up the speeches with a set of suffrage songs which was intended to focus and quiet the audience for the subsequent speeches. Todd, as a factory inspector, represented the working women and discussed the need for laws concerning wages, work conditions, and hours.

It is in Todd's article that the phrase is first mentioned. A young hired girl expressed to Todd, who was staying with the girl's family overnight during the campaign, what she had liked the most about the speeches the night before: "It was that about the women votin' so's everybody would have bread and flowers too." Todd then goes on to explain how the phrase "Bread for all, and Roses too" expresses the soul of the women's movement and explains the meaning of the phrase in her speech.

Woman is the mothering element in the world and her vote will go toward helping forward the time when life's Bread, which is home, shelter and security, and the Roses of life, music, education, nature and books, shall be the heritage of every child that is born in the country, in the government of which she has a voice.

— Helen Todd, 1911

=== Women's Trade Union League ===
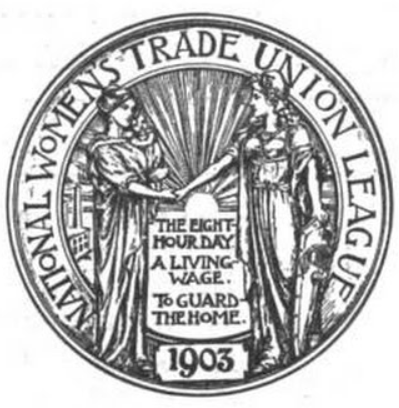
The Women's Trade Union League was central in promoting the eight-hour day, a living wage and improved working conditions.

Helen Todd became involved in the fall of 1910 with the Chicago garment workers' strike, led by the Women's Trade Union League of Chicago. The Women's Trade Union League worked closely with the Chicago Women's Club in organizing the strike, picket lines, speeches, and worker relief activities. Todd and the president of the Women's Trade Union League Margaret Robins made a number of speeches during the strike and manned the picket lines with the thousands of striking garment workers. During the strike, it was later reported that a sign was seen with the slogan "We want bread – and roses, too."

In 1911 Todd went out to California to help lead the suffrage movement in the state and campaign in the state's fall election for proposition 4, which sought women's suffrage. The women's suffrage campaign proved successful, and the right for women to vote passed in the state in November 1911. During the California campaign, the suffragettes carried banners with several slogans; one was "Bread for all, and Roses, too!"—the same phrase that Todd used in her speech the previous summer.

=== Oppenheim's poem ===
The phrase was subsequently picked up by James Oppenheim and incorporated into his poem 'Bread and Roses', which was published in The American Magazine in December 1911, with the attribution line "'Bread for all, and Roses, too' – a slogan of the women in the West." After the poem’s publication in 1911, the poem was published again in July 1912 in The Survey with the same attribution as in 1911. It was published again on October 4, 1912, in The Public, a weekly led by Louis F. Post in Chicago, this time with the slogan being attributed to the "Chicago Women Trade Unionists."

=== Lawrence textile strike ===
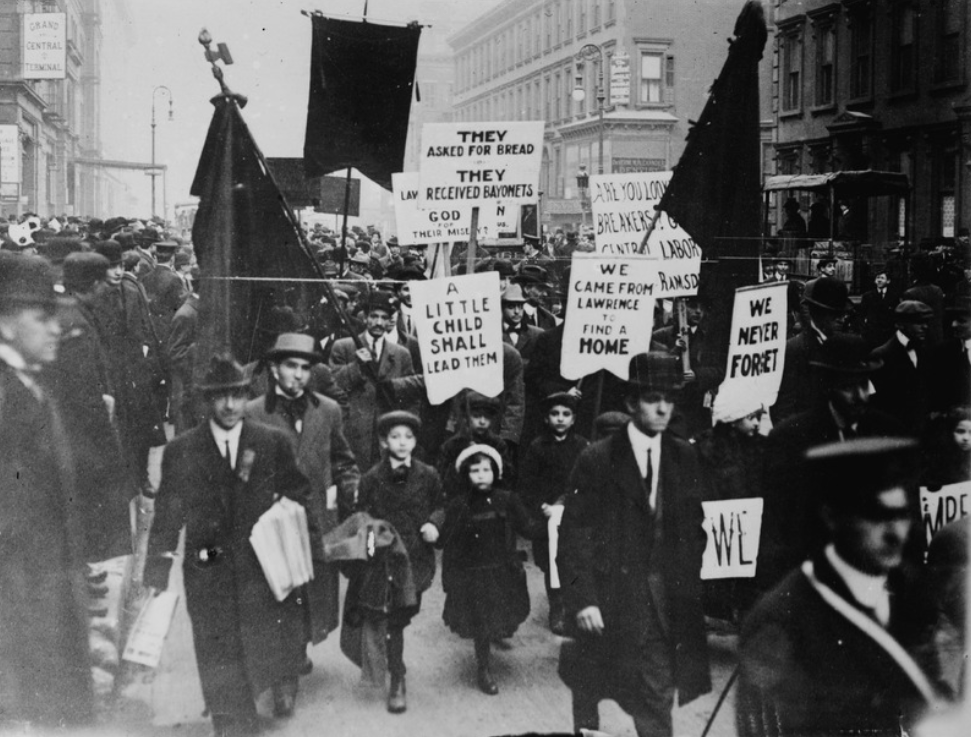
The children of Lawrence textile strikers, who were sent to New York City for temporary care, march with banners in solidarity with their parents back in Massachusetts, 1911.

The first publication of Oppenheim's poem in book form was in the 1915 labor anthology The Cry for Justice: An Anthology of the Literature of Social Protest by Upton Sinclair. This time the poem had the new attribution and rephrased slogan: "In a parade of strikers of Lawrence, Mass., some young girls carried a banner inscribed, 'We want Bread, and Roses too!'". The Lawrence textile strike, which lasted from January to March 1912, united dozens of immigrant communities under the leadership of the Industrial Workers of the World, and was led to a large extent by women. The Women's Trade Union League of Boston also became partially involved in the strike, and set up a relief station, which provided food.

The Women's Trade Union League of Boston had, however, only limited involvement in the strike, since it was affiliated with the American Federation of Labor (AFL), which did not endorse the strike. This restraint on involvement caused a number of Boston League members to resign. One critic of the AFL's failure to endorse the strike stated: "To me, many of the people in the AFL seem to be selfish, reactionary and remote from the struggle for bread and liberty of the unskilled workers..." Although popular telling of the strike includes signs being carried by women reading "We want bread, but we want roses, too!," a number of historians are of the opinion that this account is ahistorical.

The strike, as well as the poem and song, inspired the Bread and Roses Heritage Festival, an annual festival held on Labor Day in Lawrence, Massachusetts.

=== Schneiderman's speech ===
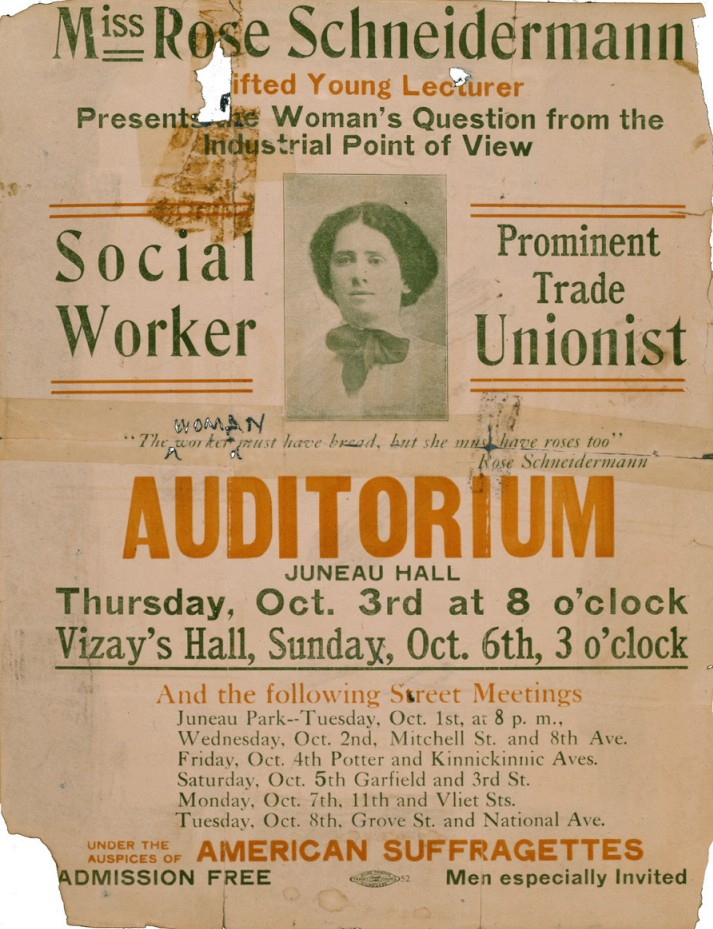
Poster from 1912 of Rose Schneiderman as speaker with her famous bread and roses quote printed on it

In May 1912, Merle Bosworth gave a speech in Plymouth, Indiana, on women suffrage in which she repeated the discussion of taxation without representation and the meaning of the phrase "Bread and Roses" that Helen Todd and her companions gave in 1910 during their automobile campaign for the women's suffrage. A month later in June 1912 Rose Schneiderman of the Women's Trade Union League of New York discussed the phrase in a speech she gave in Cleveland in support of the Ohio women's campaign for equal suffrage. In her speech, which was partially published in the Women's Trade Union League journal Life and Labor, she stated:

What the woman who labors wants is the right to live, not simply exist – the right to live as the rich woman has the right to life, and the sun and music and art. You have nothing that the humblest worker has not a right to have also. The worker must have bread, but she must have roses, too. Help, you women of privilege, give her the ballot to fight with.

— Rose Schneiderman, 1912.

Schneiderman, subsequently, gave a number of speeches in which she repeated her quote about the worker desiring bread and roses. Due to these speeches, Schneiderman's name became intertwined with the phrase bread and roses. A year after the publication of Oppenheim's poem, the Lawrence textile strike, and Schneiderman's speech, the phrase had spread throughout the country. In July 1913, for instance, during a suffrage parade in Maryland, a float with the theme "Bread for all, and roses, too" participated. The float "bore ... a boat with three children, a boy with a basket of bread and two girls with a basket of roses."

=== Galen of Pergamon ===
The source of Helen Todd's inspiration for the phrase "bread and roses" is unknown. However, there is a quote by the Roman physician and philosopher Galen of Pergamon which closely parallels the sentiment and wording of the phrase. Edward Lane, in the notes of his 1838 translation of One Thousand and One Nights, states that, according to 15th-century writer Shems-ed-Deen Moḥammad en-Nowwájee, Galen said, "He who has two cakes of bread, let him dispose of one of them for some flowers of narcissus; for bread is the food of the body, and the narcissus is the food of the soul." The sentiment that the poor were not only lacking in food for the body but also flowers for the soul was a theme among reformers of the period. In April 1907, Mary MacArthur of the British Women's Trade Union League visited the Women's Trade Union League of Chicago and gave a speech addressing this theme. Alice Henry of the Chicago League reported that McArthur's message could be summed up by Galen's quote, which she had mentioned more than once, and that although the quote warns against the materialist nature of the industrial situation, it also points in the direction in which the reformers hopes may go. McArthur's version of Galen's quote is:

If thou hast two loaves of bread, sell one and buy flowers, for bread is food for the body, but flowers are food for the mind.

— Galen of Pergamon, c. 200 AD.

== Poem ==
Bread and Roses

As we come marching, marching, in the beauty of the day,
A million darkened kitchens, a thousand mill-lofts gray
Are touched with all the radiance that a sudden sun discloses,
For the people hear us singing, "Bread and Roses, Bread and Roses."

As we come marching, marching, we battle, too, for men—
For they are women's children and we mother them again.
Our days shall not be sweated from birth until life closes—
Hearts starve as well as bodies: Give us Bread, but give us Roses.

As we come marching, marching, unnumbered women dead
Go crying through our singing their ancient song of Bread;
Small art and love and beauty their trudging spirits knew—
Yes, it is Bread we fight for—but we fight for Roses, too.

As we come marching, marching, we bring the Greater Days—
The rising of the women means the rising of the race.
No more the drudge and idler—ten that toil where one reposes—
But a sharing of life's glories: Bread and Roses, Bread and Roses.

— James Oppenheim, 1911.

== Song ==
=== Kohlsaat original ===
The poem "Bread and Roses" has been set to music several times. The earliest version was set to music by Caroline Kohlsaat in 1917. The first performance of Kohlsaat's song was at the River Forest Women's Club where she was the chorus director. Kohlsaat's song eventually drifted to the picket line. By the 1930s, the song was being extensively used by women, while they fed and supported the strikers on the picket line at the manufacturing plants. The song also migrated to the college campus. At some women's colleges, the song became part of their traditional song set.

=== Women's colleges ===
Since 1932, the song has been sung by graduating seniors at Mount Holyoke College during the Laurel Parade ceremony, part of the college's graduation tradition. It is also one of the central songs at Bryn Mawr College, traditionally sung at the College's "Step-Sings". The use of the song at Bryn Mawr College evolved out of the school's first-of-its-kind summer labor education program. In 1921, the school started the Bryn Mawr Summer School for Women Workers; each year, one hundred largely unschooled workers from factories, mills and sweatshops were brought to the school for an eight-week study in humanities and labor solidarity. The program served as a model for others in the labor education movement in the 1920s and 1930s.

=== Fariña rediscovery ===
"Bread and Roses"

Single by Judy Collins

from the album Bread and Roses
- B-side: "Out of Control"
- Released: October 1976
- Genre: Easy Listening
- Length: 3:05
- Label: Elektra
- Songwriters: Mimi Farina; James Oppenheim
- Producer: Arif Mardin

The song gained a larger audience after World War II with its publication in January 1952 in Sing Out!. In 1974 the poem was set a second time to music by Mimi Fariña. This version has been recorded by various artists, including Judy Collins, Pete Seeger, Ani DiFranco, Utah Phillips, and Josh Lucker, and is performed by a slowly growing crowd of workers in a critical scene in the 2014 movie Pride.

John Denver also set it to music in 1988, using a melody different from the more common Mimi Fariña version.

It was again set to music in Germany by Renate Fresow, using a translation by the Hannoveraner Weiberquartett, but is since most often sung with the German translation by Peter Maiwald. Composer Christian Wolff wrote a piano piece entitled "Bread and Roses" (1976) based on the strike song. In 1989/91, Si Kahn wrote a song the refrain of which starts with the song's title: "They all sang 'Bread and Roses'".

=== Translations ===
The poem has been translated into Russian by Russian poet Kirill Felixovich Medvedev, set to the original Kohlsaat music, and performed by the Moscow-based political activist punk collective Arkadiy Kots (Аркадий Коц), appearing on their 2016 album Music for the Working Class.

== Legacy ==
Mimi Fariña created the Bread and Roses Benefit Agency in 1974.

The logo for the Democratic Socialists of America, formed in 1982, was inspired by the slogan. "Bread & Roses" is also a name of a national caucus within the organization. They have 3 (out of 16) members of the DSA's National Political Committee.

A quarterly journal produced by the UK section of the Industrial Workers of the World ('Wobblies') is called Bread and Roses.

The 2014 film Pride depicts the members of a Welsh mining community singing "Bread and Roses" at a National Union of Mineworkers lodge during the UK miners' strike (1984–1985).

In 2018, the song was used in a video produced by London-Irish Abortion Rights Campaign to promote the #HomeToVote movement, which encouraged young Irish people living abroad to return home to vote in the Referendum on the Thirty-sixth Amendment of the Irish Constitution.

In 2022, the TV series Riverdale depicted families of construction workers singing "Bread and Roses" to the workers to lift a spell their boss had put on them to break a strike.

The international socialist feminist organization Pan y Rosas is named after the slogan.

Miriam Schneir included it in her anthology, Feminism: The Essential Historical Writings, labelling it as one of the essential works of feminism.

The 2023 documentary Bread and Roses, directed by Afghan filmmaker Sahra Mani and co-produced by Jennifer Lawrence and Malala Yousafzai, is about the women in Afghanistan and the role of the Taliban following the United States' withdrawal from Afghanistan. The film's title is a reference to the slogan.

In 2026, the song was performed by Lucy Dacus in the historic public inauguration of New York Mayor Zohran Mamdani at New York City Hall.

== See also ==
- Anna LoPizzo, woman striker killed during the Lawrence textile strike
- William M. Wood, co-founder of the American Woolen Company
- Sonja Davies, a New Zealand trade unionist, peace campaigner, Member of Parliament, and author of Bread and Roses: Her Story – an autobiography
- Bread and Roses, a Ken Loach movie
- Bread and circuses
- Rose (symbolism)
- List of socialist songs

== Bibliography ==
- Bruce Watson, Bread and Roses: Mills, Migrants, and the Struggle for the American Dream (New York: Viking, 2005), ISBN 0-670-03397-9.
