= Anarchism and Other Essays =

1910 collection of essays written by Emma Goldman

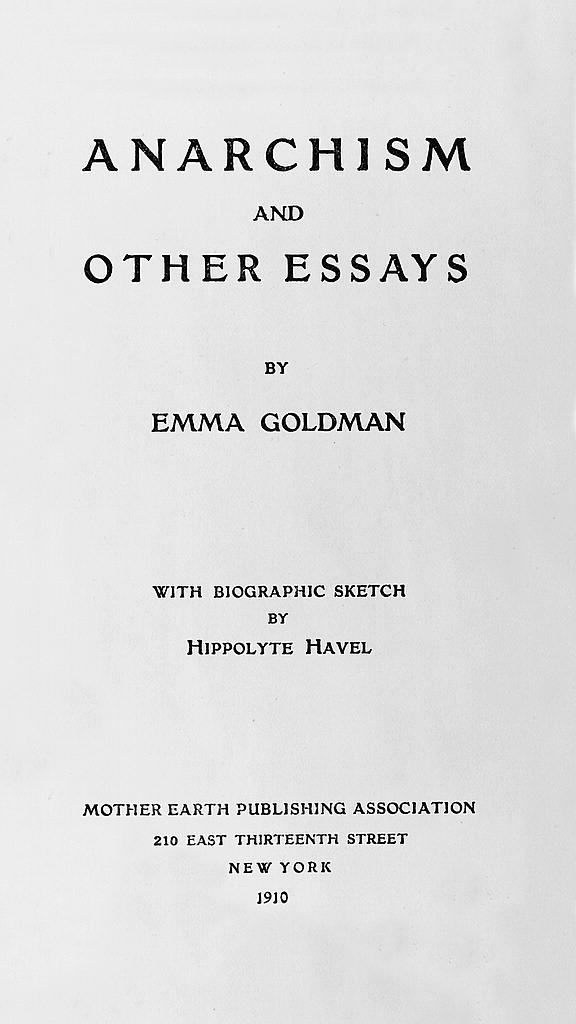
- Title page from Anarchism and Other Essays
- Author: Emma Goldman
- Language: English
- Subject: Anarchism
- Publisher: Mother Earth Publishing Association
- Publication date: 1910
- Publication place: United States
- Pages: 277 (first edition)
- OCLC: 559000182
- Dewey Decimal: 335.83
- LC Class: 88114786
- Text: Anarchism and Other Essays at Wikisource

Anarchism and Other Essays (1910) is a collection of essays written by Emma Goldman, first published by Mother Earth Publishing Association. The essays outline Goldman's anarchist views on a number of subjects, most notably the oppression of women and perceived shortcomings of first wave feminism, but also prisons, political violence, sexuality, religion, nationalism and art theory. Hippolyte Havel contributed a short biography of Goldman to the anthology. The essays were adapted from lectures Goldman had given on fundraising tours for her journal Mother Earth. Anarchism and Other Essays was Goldman's first published book. "The Traffic in Women" has received particular attention from feminist scholars since the book's publication.

== Background ==
Emma Goldman published the first issue of Mother Earth in March 1906. Though she had written extensively for other periodicals, Mother Earth was her first experience with editing and publishing a political journal. Goldman funded the journal's publication through extensive lecture tours throughout the United States.

Ben Reitman, Goldman's tour manager and romantic partner, suggested that she revise her lectures for publication. Goldman herself was becoming frustrated with the limitations of lecturing to crowds. She believed the audiences were generally more interested in the spectacle of a controversial anarchist speaker than in the content of her lectures. "I am not sanguine enough to hope that my readers will be as numerous as those who have heard me," she wrote. "But I prefer to reach the few who really want to learn, rather than the many who come to be amused."

Goldman completed the manuscript at a farm in Ossining, New York, while recovering from knee injuries. The process took two months. Alexander Berkman edited the final proofs. Upon its completion, publishers were uninterested in the collection. Reitman suggested self-publishing the book through Mother Earth's printers, who had agreed to print the book on credit.

An earlier version of "The Traffic in Women", entitled "The White Slave Traffic", first appeared in Mother Earth's January 1910 edition.

== Contents ==
- "Biographic Sketch" written by Hippolyte Havel
- "Anarchism: What It Really Stands For"
- "Minorities Versus Majorities"
- "The Psychology of Political Violence"
- "Prisons: A Social Crime and Failure"
- "Patriotism: A Menace to Liberty"
- "Francisco Ferrer and The Modern School"
- "The Hypocrisy of Puritanism"
- "The Traffic in Women"
- "Woman Suffrage"
- "The Tragedy of Woman's Emancipation"
- "Marriage and Love"
- "The Drama: A Powerful Disseminator of Radical Thought"

== Reception and legacy ==
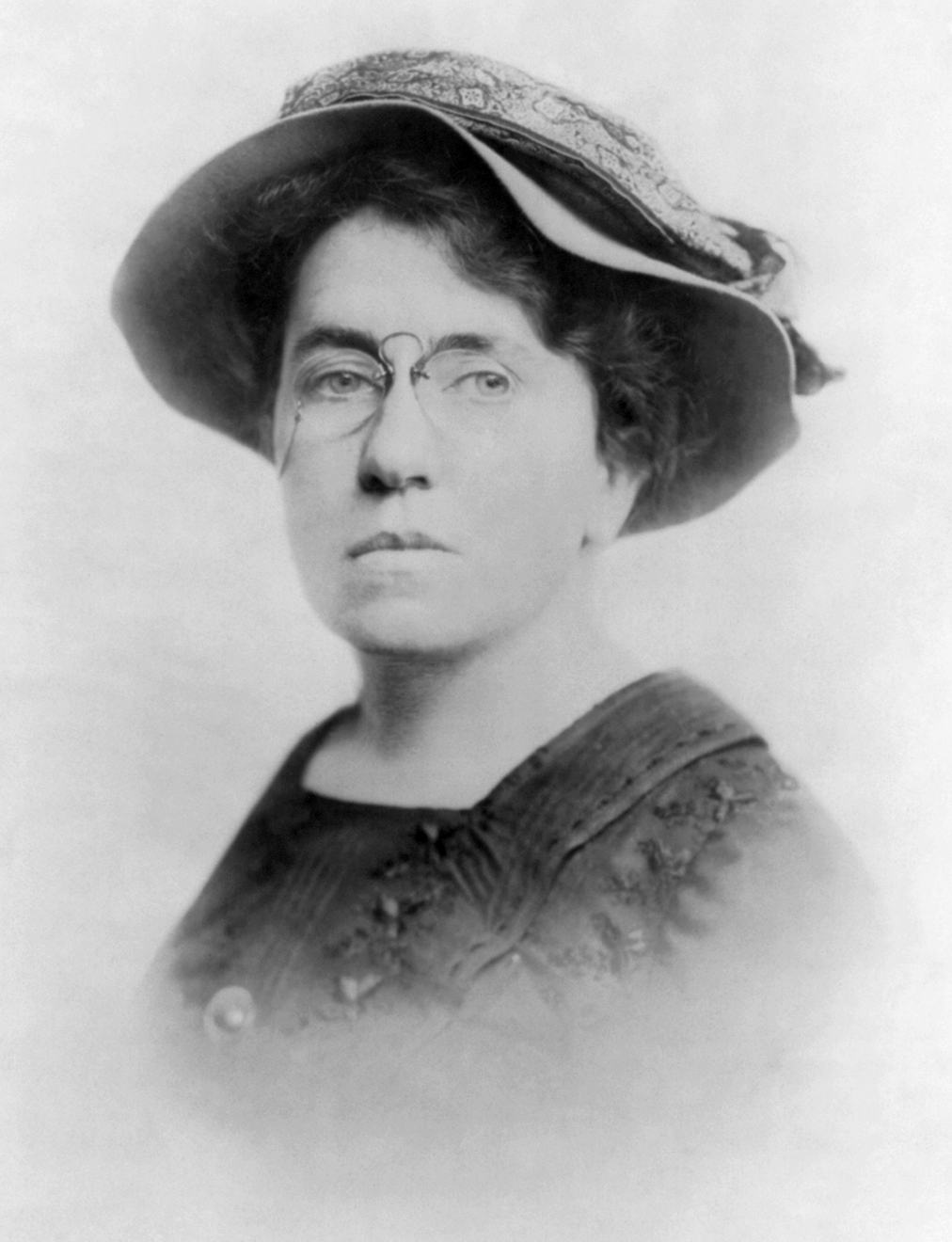
Emma Goldman, c. 1910, portrait from Anarchism and Other Essays

The collection received favorable reviews from critics upon its release. Commentators generally criticized Goldman's refusal to condemn political violence, but recommended the book to readers interested in social issues. Editors at the International Socialist Review criticized Goldman's title essay for its purported exaggerations. "The 'other essays' are much better than the first," they concluded, "and contain much that is worth reading.

"The Traffic in Women" has been cited in feminist discussions of marriage, sexuality, and prostitution for a century following its publication. Lori Jo Marso argues that Goldman's essays, in conjunction with her life and thought, make important contributions to ongoing debates in feminism, including around "the connections and tensions between sexuality, love and feminist politics". Miriam Schneir included the essay in her anthology, Feminism: The Essential Historical Writings.

== See also ==
- Anarchism in the United States
- List of books about anarchism
