= The Traffic in Women =

Essay by Emma Goldman

"The Traffic in Women" is an essay by anarchist writer Emma Goldman in 1910. It has been circulated in a variety of publications, namely Anarchism and Other Essays (1910), published by Mother Earth, (Note: It was published within Goldman's Anarchism and Other Essays (2nd revised ed.). New York; London: Mother Earth Publishing Association. 1911. pp. 183–200.) as well as the leading essay of The Traffic in Women, and Other Essays on Feminism (1971). Mother Earth was a monthly anarchist magazine founded by Goldman, Max Baginski, and others in 1906. The essay is one of more than 20 articles that Goldman wrote during 1906 to 1940.

== Content ==
The essay was written in response to the actions of contemporary social reformers campaigning against white slavery, whose legislative campaign Goldman claimed would only serve to create "fat political jobs" for "parasites". In the essay, she argues that the major cause of white slavery, that has been ignored by these reformers, is capitalist exploitation. Goldman criticizes the role played by Christian churches in historically encouraging and maintaining prostitution. Goldman presents marriage as on the same continuum as prostitution, arguing that in both cases women are sold and circulated, and is critical of "moralists" who condemn prostitution but not marriage for monetary considerations. Goldman further argues that double standards surrounding male and female sexuality pressure women who engage in sexual activity outside marriage into a life of prostitution, thereby "society creates the victims that it afterwards vainly attempts to get rid of".

== Reception and legacy ==
American radical feminist writer Alix Kates Shulman strongly endorsed the essay, reading the entirety of it into the record of a legislative hearing on prostitution in New York. She argues that Goldman's sympathy for prostitutes was due to identifying with them, "because of their class and because they defied the sexual hypocrisy of Puritanism". The essay served as an inspiration for anthropologist Gayle Rubin's 1975 essay "The Traffic in Women: Notes on the 'Political Economy' of Sex". While Rubin follows Goldman in arguing that prostitution is part of the same spectrum as marriage, she also builds off of the ideas of Claude Levi-Strauss and Sigmund Freud, to describe a "sex/gender system" through which such transactions can occur. Miriam Schneir included this text in her anthology Feminism: The Essential Historical Writings, labelling it as one of the essential works of feminism.
