= Bread and Roses Heritage Festival =

Festival in Lawrence, Massachusetts, US

- Genre: Festival
- Frequency: Annual
- Location: Lawrence, Massachusetts

The Bread and Roses Heritage Festival is an annual, open-air festival in Lawrence, Massachusetts that celebrates labor history, cultural diversity, and social justice. It is a free, day-long event featuring live music and dance, children's activities, theater and spoken word performances, walking and trolley tours, ethnic food, Lawrence History Live! and information from local organizations involved in social justice issues. The Bread And Roses Heritage Committee produces the event. The festival has occurred every year on Labor Day since its inception in 1986. The festival's name refers to the Bread and Roses Strike of 1912, when over 20,000 immigrant workers in Lawrence, protested wage cuts for over two months, led by the Industrial Workers of the World. The strike was notable for its short-term success, despite ethnic divisions among the workers and the preponderance of women among the protesters.

== History of the slogan "Bread and Roses" ==
The slogan "Bread and Roses" originated in a speech given by Rose Schneiderman; a line in that speech ("The worker must have bread, but she must have roses, too.") inspired the title of the poem Bread and Roses by James Oppenheim, published in The American Magazine in December 1911, which attributed it to "the women in the West." It is now commonly associated with the 1912 Lawrence textile strike. The slogan appeals for both fair wages and dignified conditions. The strike and the slogan have been the inspiration for the names of a diverse collection of organisations and publications.

== Bread and Roses Heritage Committee ==
The Bread And Roses Heritage Committee, Inc. was established in 1986 and has been active ever since.

=== Mission ===
- To organize the annual Bread & Roses Labor Day Festival that celebrates Lawrence's history and diverse cultures through music, theater and dance.
- To recognize, commemorate, inform, and share the labor history and social justice legacy of Lawrence's 1912 Bread & Roses strike with Lawrence's present day residents and people worldwide.

== Lawrence History Live! ==
Lawrence History Live! was created in 2008 to give labor history, labor education, and the unique immigrant experience of Lawrence a more prominent place in the Bread and Roses Heritage Festival. Historians, writers, union representatives, artists and relatives of families linked to strikers present their insights into Lawrence's history in a centrally located tent. Lawrence History Live! also includes a segment on present-day issues facing Lawrence's and the nation's workers. Festival visitors are encouraged to participate and contribute their views in a question-and-answer format.

== Bread and Roses Centennial ==
In honor of the centennial anniversary of the Bread and Roses Strike, the 1912 Strikers' Monument Committee affixed a bronze relief to a boulder in Lawrence's historic Campagnone Common in October 2012. The City of Lawrence also installed the Centennial Flag Pole in commemoration of the anniversary. In addition, the Bread & Roses Heritage Committee commissioned a documentary to capture the centennial celebration of 2012.

Members of the Labor Community organized a march from the Polartec Building in Lawrence to the 2012 Bread & Roses Festival. Speakers from the Merrimack Valley Central Labor Council and the Lawrence Teachers Union addressed those marching. Ethan Snow of the UNITE HERE labor union expressed the continuity of the labor struggle by linking the Occupy Wall Street Movement's "99 percent" slogan to the 1912 strikers and to the plight of modern laborers in Lawrence: "One hundred years ago, workers took a stand against the greed of the 1%. Today we are faced with a similar situation in Lawrence, and we too will take up the fight for current day Bread & Roses."

=== Centennial exhibit ===
To commemorate the centennial anniversary of the "Bread and Roses strike," The Lawrence History Center opened an exhibit and cultural space on January 12, 2012 entitled "Short Pay! All Out!: The Great Lawrence Strike of 1912." The space is free and open to the public. The bilingual exhibit showcases the events of the "Bread and Roses strike," and the exhibit's cultural space is available for lectures, meetings, performances, and community gatherings relevant to the themes of the strike of 1912. The exhibit is housed on the sixth floor of the Everett Mill building (15 Union St., Lawrence), the very place where the strike began. The Bread and Roses Centennial Committee created an accompanying online exhibit.
