= Hippolyte Havel =

American anarchist (1871–1950)

- Born: August 11, 1871; Bukovsko, Austria-Hungary
- Died: March 10, 1950 (aged 78); New Jersey

Hippolyte Havel (August 11, 1871 – March 10, 1950) was an American anarchist who was known as an activist in the United States and part of the radical circle around Emma Goldman in the early 20th century. He had been imprisoned as a young man in Austria-Hungary because of his political activities, but made his way to London. Then in the British metropolis he met anarchist Emma Goldman on a lecture tour from the United States. She befriended him and he immigrated to the United States.

He settled in Greenwich Village, New York, a center of radicals, artists, and writers. He declared the neighborhood to be "a spiritual zone of mind". For a time he and his wife ran a restaurant in the village. He also edited radical journals. He was close friends with Emma Goldman, and also became friends with playwright Eugene O'Neill, and various others in the artistic circles.

== Life ==
Havel was born Josef Hypolit Havel on August 11, 1871 in the South Bohemian village of Bukovsko (now Dolní Bukovsko, Czech Republic) to weaver Hypolit Havel and his wife Anna Zikešová. He became involved in the anarchist movement and in his youth was imprisoned for anarchist activities by the imperial authorities in Austria-Hungary. At the time, he was declared as "criminally insane", but he was declared sane by the intervention of Richard von Krafft-Ebing, a noted Austro-German psychiatrist. As a result, Havel was transferred from the prison madhouse to an ordinary prison and the general population.

He managed to flee to London, where, in November 1899, he met the American anarchist and activist Emma Goldman, who was on a lecture tour. They traveled together to Paris, France, where he helped her with preparations for the September 1900 International Anti-Parliamentary Congress.

Havel traveled with Goldman from Europe to the United States, entered as an immigrant, and settled in Chicago. For a time, he shared a residence with her and Mary and Abe Isaak, an anarchist couple, and their family. In September 1901, Goldman, Havel, Isaak, and ten other anarchists were arrested as suspects in connection with Leon Czolgosz's assassination of President William McKinley. Czolgosz had said he was inspired by a speech of Goldman. Although he insisted she had no direct involvement in his action, Goldman was held by police for two weeks. Havel and the other anarchists were released earlier. The assassination generated considerable anti-anarchist reaction politically, and most anarchists disavowed Czolgosz's actions.

Havel worked for a time in Chicago as the editor of several anarchist publications, including the Chicago Arbeiter Zeitung, which was published in German He later worked as editor on The Revolutionary Almanac (1914), and Revolt (1916). Sometime in the early 1900s, he and Goldman moved to New York City, where they lived in Greenwich Village, a center of radical politics and artists and writers.

There, Havel married Polly Holladay, an anarchist who with him ran a restaurant on Washington Square. The establishment was frequented by radicals, artists, and writers. Havel may also have been Goldman's lover even after his marriage to Polly. In the late 1910s, Havel took in Berenice Abbott as his adopted daughter, who became a noted photographer.

Havel wrote a biography of Goldman and an introductory essay to her collected Anarchism and Other Essays (1910). He also contributed dozens of articles and essays to anarchist journals, including Goldman's Mother Earth. His essay "What Is Anarchism?" was published also in 1932. A collection of his writings was published for the first time in 2018.

Havel became friends in that period with the playwright Eugene O'Neill. The writer based the character Hugo Kalmar in The Iceman Cometh on Havel.

Havel died March 10, 1950, in New Jersey. He was 78 years old.

== Selected works ==
- "Harry Kelly: An Appreciation" (1921)
- "What is Anarchism?" (1932)
- Proletarian Days: A Hippolyte Havel Reader, edited by Nathan Jun; Barry Pateman (Introduction); AK Press (2018, paperback) ISBN 978-1849353281

== See also ==
- Anarchism in the United States
- Czech American
