= Walter Schneir =

American journalist and author (1927–2009)

- Born: December 14, 1927; Brooklyn, New York
- Died: April 11, 2009 (aged 81); Pleasantville, New York
- Education: Syracuse University
- Occupations: Journalist; editor; author
- Spouse: Miriam Blumberg (m. 1958)
- Children: 3
- Writing career
- Notable work: Invitation to an Inquest: A New Look at the Rosenberg-Sobell Case (1965)

Walter Schneir (December 14, 1927, Brooklyn – April 11, 2009, Pleasantville, New York) was an American journalist, editor and author. He is best known for his research into the Rosenberg espionage case.

== Early life ==
Walter Daniel Schneir was born in Brooklyn in 1927. His father, David Schneir, was an attorney practicing law in New York City. In 1941, he was appointed to the State Public Service Commission, and the Schneir family relocated to Albany, New York.

== Career ==
Walter graduated from Syracuse University with a degree in journalism. He worked in New York City for many years as editor of MD Medical News magazine. He also pursued freelance journalism, authoring articles on science, health, politics, education, and law. His writings appeared in The Reporter, The Nation, The New York Times Magazine, Ramparts, The Progressive, and The New York Times op-ed page. He did news reporting for the pacifist journal, Liberation, and served in the late 1950s as Chairman of the Queens County Committee for a Sane Nuclear Policy.

In 1959 he and his wife Miriam began to research and write about the trial of Julius and Ethel Rosenberg, who had been convicted along with Morton Sobell as atomic spies for the Soviet Union. The Rosenbergs were executed by electric chair in 1953, while Sobell received a lengthy prison sentence. Walter quit his editor job to devote himself fully to the Rosenberg project. He and Miriam used the attic of their house in Queens as an office. The resulting book, Invitation to an Inquest, was published in summer of 1965. Subsequent editions with new chapters appeared in 1968, 1973, and 1983. In the latter year, controversies erupted when Ronald Radosh and Joyce Milton published The Rosenberg File: A Search for Truth, which attacked the conclusions of the Schneirs' book. The two sets of authors argued about the Rosenberg case both in the press and in an in-person debate.

Walter also covered political events in the late 1960s. His anthology about the protests at the 1968 Democratic National Convention, Telling it Like It Was: The Chicago Riots, was published in 1969. In the 1980s, he became interested in the Westmoreland v. CBS libel suit filed by Vietnam War General William Westmoreland against CBS. Schneir believed the case constituted an attack by political conservatives on the freedom of the press. As an aid to legal scholars and to students of broadcast journalism, he indexed the voluminous material disclosed in the months leading up to the civil trial, and published Westmoreland v. CBS: Guide to the Microfiche Collection in 1987.

Over the decades, as additional information was released about the Rosenbergs, both from Freedom of Information Act requests and from documents out of the former Soviet Union, Schneir modified some of his earlier positions from Invitation to an Inquest. He was initially swayed by the "Venona" transcripts, which indicated that Julius had engaged in espionage, while Ethel had not. But shortly before his death, Schneir began to be skeptical that the Venona releases represented the last word on Cold War spying. His 2010 book, Final Verdict: What Really Happened in the Rosenberg Case, with Preface and Afterword by Miriam Schneir, was published posthumously. It concluded that Ethel's brother David Greenglass and his wife Ruth "were indeed guilty of trying to steal secrets of the atomic bomb but Julius and Ethel were not."

== Death ==
On April 11, 2009, Walter Schneir died of thyroid cancer at his home in Pleasantville, N.Y. He was 81. He was survived by his wife Miriam and their daughter, two sons, and four grandchildren.

== Bibliography ==
=== Books ===
- Schneir, Walter; Schneir, Miriam (1965). Invitation to an Inquest: A New Look at the Rosenberg-Sobell Case (1st ed.). Garden City, NY: Doubleday & Company. LCCN 64011751. OCLC 500023.
- Schneir, Walter, ed. (1969). Telling It Like It Was: The Chicago Riots. New York: New American Library. LCCN 76017312.
- Schneir, Walter; Schneir, Miriam (1983). Invitation to an Inquest: Reopening the Rosenberg "Atom Spy" Case (Revised and expanded ed.). New York: Pantheon Books. ISBN 0394714962. OCLC 9082135.
- Schneir, Walter, ed. (1987). Westmoreland v. CBS: Guide to the Microfiche Collection (PDF). New York: Clearwater Publishing Company. ISBN 978-0883540381.
- Schneir, Walter; Schneir, Miriam (2010). Final Verdict: What Really Happened in the Rosenberg Case. Brooklyn, NY: Melville House. ISBN 978-1935554165.

=== Selected articles ===
- Schneir, Walter (April 25, 1959). "Strontium-90 in U.S. Children". The Nation. Vol. 188, no. 17. pp. 355–357.
- Schneir, Walter (July 9, 1959). "A Primer on Fallout". The Reporter. pp. 17–24.
- Schneir, Walter (October 1, 1959). "The Campaign to Make Chemical Warfare Respectable". The Reporter. pp. 24–28.
- Schneir, Walter (October 1968). "Chicago: Terror on Display". Liberation.
- Schneir, Walter (1971). "Desanctifying the Courts". In Black, Jonathan (ed.). Radical Lawyers: Their Role in the Movement and in the Courts. Avon Books. pp. 297–301. LCCN 72178218.
- Schneir, Walter; Schneir, Miriam (April 4, 1971). "The Joy of Learning – In the Open Corridor". The New York Times.
- Schneir, Walter (August 1973). "The Second Frame-Up of Julius and Ethel Rosenberg". Ramparts.
- Schneir, Walter (December 17, 1974). "Opening F.B.I. Files". The New York Times.
- Schneir, Walter; Schneir, Miriam (March 30, 1985). "The Right's Attack on the Press" (PDF). The Nation.
- Schneir, Walter; Schneir, Miriam (June 17, 1999). "Cables Coming in from the Cold". The Nation.
- Schneir, Walter; Schneir, Miriam (April 16, 2009). "Cables Coming in from the Cold". The Nation.
