= Feminism: The Essential Historical Writings =

1972 anthology of feminist texts

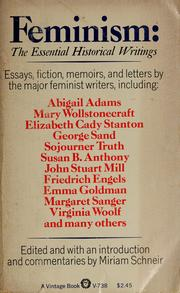
- Cover of 1972 edition
- Editor: Miriam Schneir
- Language: English
- Published: 1972, 1994
- Publisher: Vintage Books
- Pages: 374

Feminism: The Essential Historical Writings is an anthology edited with an introduction and commentaries by Miriam Schneir. It was originally published in 1972 and re-published in 1994 by Vintage Books. It consists of essays, fiction, memoirs, and letters by what Schneir labels the major feminist writers. The content included ranges from 1776 to 1929 and focuses on topics of civil rights and emancipation. The book has had an influence on education, being used as a resource in women's studies classes. Various scholars have given both positive and negative reviews of this book. It remains in print to this day.

== Introduction and commentaries ==
Schneir supplied the introduction to the book as well as commentaries on each work and its author. In the introduction, she defines the book's main purpose as simply to acquaint women with the great feminist writings of the past. She notes how much of the included content focuses on "still-unsolved feminist problems", and therefore the book is about both the past and future of the feminist movement.

== Content ==
The book is made up of essays, fiction, memoirs, and letters by what Schneir labels the major feminist writers, including Elizabeth Cady Stanton, George Sand, Mary Wollstonecraft, Abigail Adams, Emma Goldman, Friedrich Engels, Sojourner Truth, Susan B. Anthony, John Stuart Mill, Margaret Sanger, Virginia Woolf, and many others. The presented materials range from the 18th to 20th century, with the earliest work being from 1776 and the latest from 1929. Schneir describes this as the phase of "old feminism". Most of the works included were written by Americans, with the addition of some by European writers. The book has five sections: Eighteenth Century Rebels, Women Alone, An American Women’s Movement, Men as Feminists, and Twentieth-Century Themes. The content is related to a theme of civil rights and emancipation, specifically focusing on topics of marriage, economic dependence, and personal independence and selfhood. It also includes multiple works written by male socialists, linking ideas of feminism and socialism together.

=== Choice of content ===
Schneir described her process of choosing the material for the book as looking for the basic, essential writings of feminism that everyone should know. She justifies the use of predominantly American content through her American nationality and the idea that the United States was the world center of "old feminism". The influence of Schneir’s leftist background can also be considered when examining the content chosen for this book.

=== List of content included ===
Schneir includes experts from the works below. The works are listed in chronological order.

Content
Work	Author
Familiar Letters of John Adams and His Wife, Abigail Adams, During the Revolution	Abigail Adams
A Vindication of the Rights of Woman	Mary Wollstonecraft
Course of Popular Lectures	Frances Wright
Indiana	George Sand
Letters of George Sand	George Sand
The Intimate Journal of George Sand	George Sand
Letters on the Equality of the Sexes and the Condition of Women	Sarah Moore Grimké
Early Factory Labour in New England	Harriet M. Robinson
The Song of the Shirt	Thomas Hood
Woman in the Nineteenth Century	Margaret Fuller
Married Women's Property Act, New York, 1848	N/A
Declaration of Sentiments and Resolutions, Seneca Falls	N/A
Editorial from The North Star	Frederick Douglass
Intelligent Wickedness	William Lloyd Garrison
Letter from Prison of St. Lazare, Paris	N/A
Ain't I a Woman?	Sojourner Truth
What Time of Night It Is	Sojourner Truth
Not Christianity, but Priestcraft	Lucretia Mott
Marriage of Lucy Stone Under Protest	Lucy Stone
Disappointment Is the Lot of Women	Lucy Stone
Address to the New York State Legislature, 1854	Elizabeth Cady Stanton
Address to the New York State Legislature, 1860	Elizabeth Cady Stanton
Married Women's Property Act, New York, 1860	N/A
Petitions Were Circulated	Ernestine Rose
Keeping the Thing Going While Things are Stirring	Sojourner Truth
The United States of America vs. Susan B. Anthony	Susan B. Anthony
Woman Wants Bread, Not the Ballot!	Susan B. Anthony
Virtue: What It Is, and What It Is Not	Victoria Woodhull & Tennessee Claflin
Which Is to Blame?	Victoria Woodhull & Tennessee Claflin
The Elixir of Life	Victoria Woodhull & Tennessee Claflin
Womanliness	Elizabeth Cady Stanton
Solitude of Self	Elizabeth Cady Stanton
The Subjection of Women	John Stuart Mill
A Doll's House	Henrik Ibsen
The Origin of the Family, Private Property, and the State	Friedrich Engels
Women and Socialism	August Bebel
The Theory of the Leisure Class	Thorstein Veblen
Women and Economics	Charlotte Perkins Gilman
The Lady	Emily James Smith Putnam
Senate Report - History of Women in Industry in the United States	N/A
Women's Share in Social Culture	Anna Garlin Spencer
The World Movement for Woman Suffrage 1904 to 1911: Is Woman Suffrage Progressing?	Carrie Chapman Catt
I Incite This Meeting to Rebellion When Civil War Is Waged by Women	Emmeline Pankhurst
Bread and Roses	N/A
The Traffic in Women	Emma Goldman
Marriage and Love	Emma Goldman
Women and the New Race	Margaret Sanger
My Recollections of Lenin: An Interview on the Woman Question	Clara Zetkin
A Room of One's Own	Virginia Woolf
On Understanding Women	Mary Ritter Beard

== Influence ==
=== Educational use ===
This book has held influence in education as it has been used to teach students about feminism. In the absence of the history of feminism from traditional history books, students studied this book in women's studies classes. Some scholars say that it is an accessible and useful resource for undergraduate courses focusing on the history of feminism. It is said to be good because it covers old materials in an engaging way and encourages students to continue learning about them. Others recognize that it provides insight into how particular discourses and narratives are established and think of it as a resource for students to be critical of and challenge the dominant constructions of feminist history.

== Reviews ==
One common point of discussion throughout reviews is the construction of the history of feminism that this book produces. Knowledge production is often critiqued, as sometimes it is based on very few ideas. This book produces a knowledge of feminism without considering multiple ideas. Some argue that this book highlights a linear progression of a western narrative of feminism, not examining feminism in different historical periods or different countries. This results in the absence of diverse views and perspectives. Further, some note that the book fails to consider race. The construction of feminist history produced in it both misrepresents and does not appropriately include Black women's perspectives.

Multiple scholars mentioned Schneir's introduction and commentaries in their reviews. The writing on the back cover of the book is critiqued for being misleading. It states that the book highlights ignored or forgotten materials, but most of the material is actually pretty well known. Some also feel that more critical introductions to the works and more critical bibliographies for each writer would have added value to the book.

Some scholars recognize the importance of the book. They feel that it is an excellent collection of works from the history of feminism. Others additionally note that the book holds historical significance.
