= Kirill Medvedev =

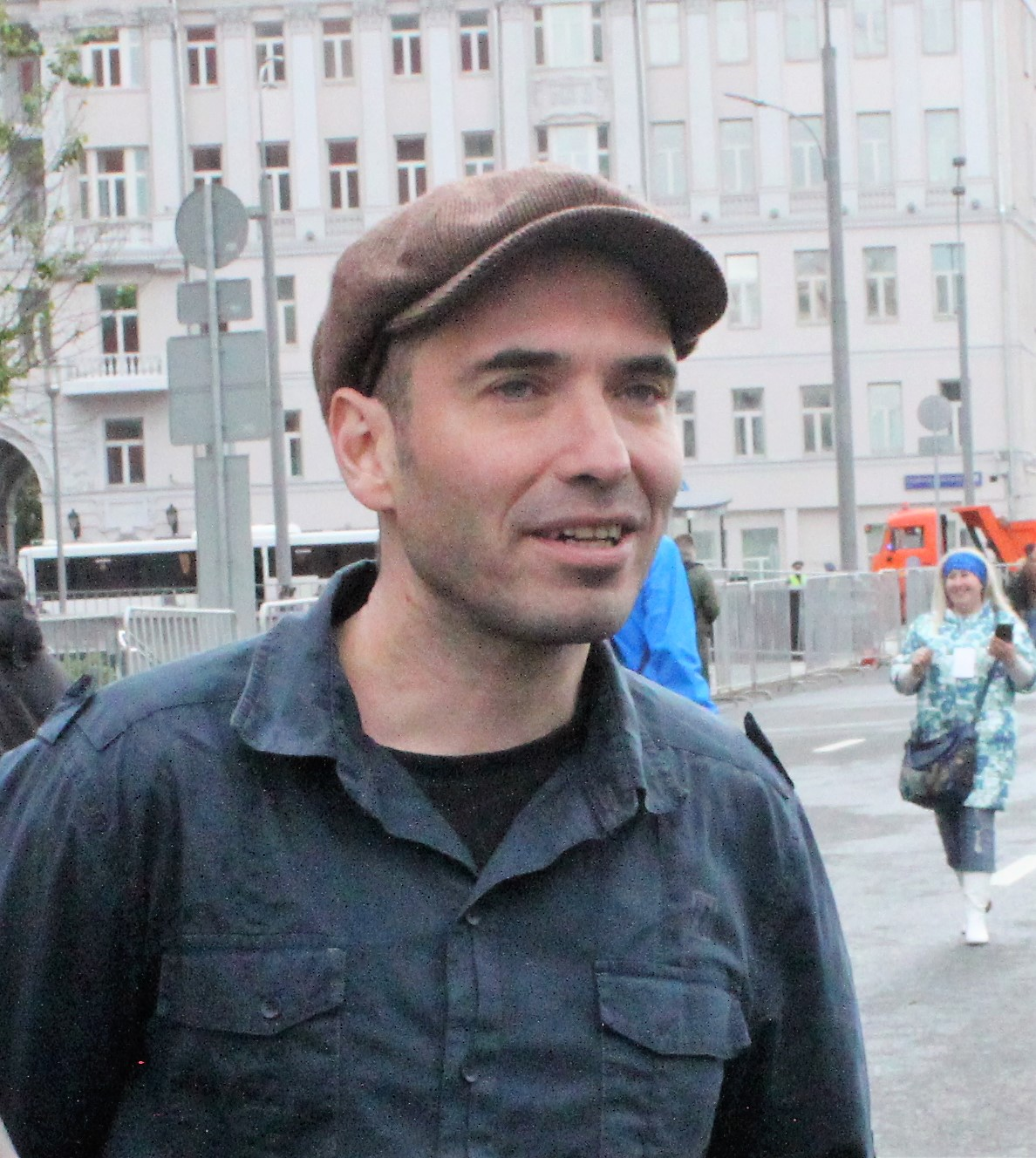
- Medvedev in Moscow on June 10, 2018 in a rally "For a free Russia without repression and despotism"
- Born: 19 June 1975; Moscow, Soviet Union
- Notable work: It's No Good (poetry collection)
- Website: http://kirillmedvedev.narod.ru/

Kirill Medvedev (Russian: Кирилл Феликсович Медведев; born 19 June 1975) is a Soviet and Russian activist, musician, translator and author who notably gave up the copyright to all his works in 2004. He is a key member of the musical group "Arkadiy Kots."

== Early life and education ==
Kirill Medvedev was born on June 19, 1975, in Moscow. His father Feliks was a well-known post-Soviet journalist and writer. From 1992 to 1995 he studied in the history department at the Moscow State University.

== Career ==
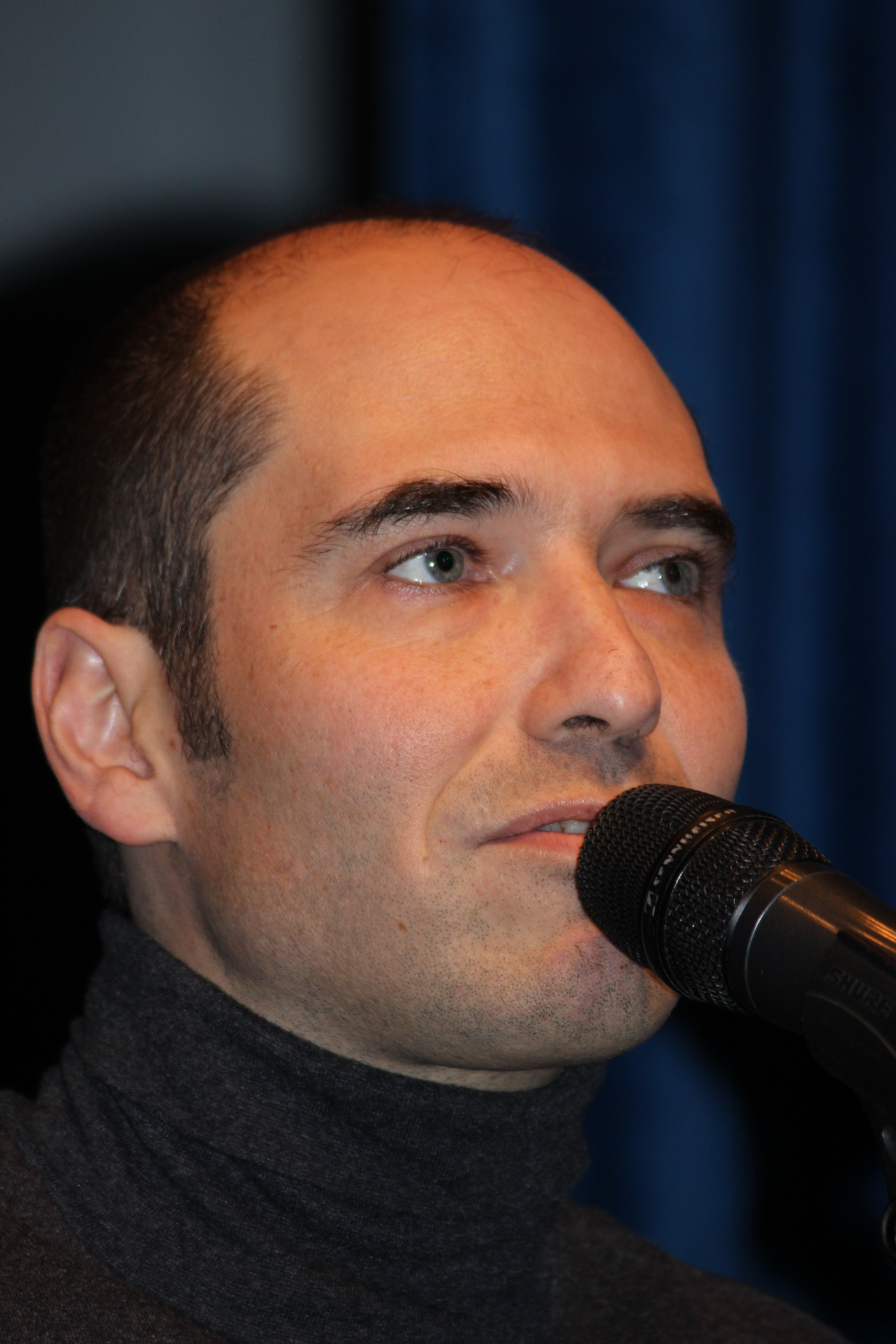
Medvedev reading his poems at the Moscow Poetry Biennale 2019

Medvedev published two collections of poetry in his mid twenties: Everything is Bad (or It’s No Good) and Incursion; these were dismissed by some critics as they were autobiographical free verse, which is unusual among Russian poets. He also translated Charles Bukowski into Russian.

In 2003, he renounced his copyright in his "Manifesto on Copyright". Literary scholar Annette Gilbert has interpreted Medvedev’s manifesto and his turning away from the established literary world as a continuation of the resistance of Russian authors against a state-regulated publishing system and samizdat.

In 2007, Medvedev founded the Free Marxist Press, which publishes the works of Ernest Mandel, Pier Paolo Pasolini, Herbert Marcuse, Terry Eagleton, and Russian authors.

In 2012, It’s No Good: poems/essays/actions a collection of poems, essays, and actions were published in English for the first time, by n+1 / Ugly Duckling Presse. In it he described his perspective in and among the mainstream poets, the inextricable "link between politics and culture," and how refusal of copyright or recognition for his works is part of a fundamental role of art to challenge existing power systems.

For an artist to take part in this system is to support and encourage it, even as he justifies himself with the idea that 'pure art is outside ideology and politics.'

— Kirill Medvedev, "Brecht Is Not Your Aunt", It's No Good (2012)

=== Musician ===
Medvedev has been performing vocals and guitar in the Arkadiy Kots Band, a riot-folk band based in Moscow which formed in 2010. The band draws its name from the Russian socialist poet Arkady Kots who translated The Internationale into Russian.

=== Activism ===
In the early 2000s Medvedev joined a small socialist party called Vpered ("Forward"). In 2017, Medvedev announced he was running in the municipal elections in the Meshchansky District. On 12 September 2017, he announced on the party's Facebook page that he received about 11% of the vote (379 votes) and was not elected.

== Personal life ==
In 2015 Medvedev said, that for several years he "was a stay-at-home father; more recently I have worked as a delivery man for several companies as well as a freelance book editor".

== Works in english translation ==
Books

Kirill Medvedev. "It's No Good." Translated by Keith Gessen, Mark Krotov, Cory Merrill, Bela Shayevich (n+1/New York: Ugly Duckling Press, 2016).
