= Robert J. S. Ross =

American sociologist and activist (born 1943)

Robert J. S. Ross (born 1943) is an American sociologist and activist known for his research on the global garment trade. He is a Research Professor in the Department of Sociology and at the Mosakowski Institute for Public Enterprise at Clark University where he has taught since 1972. He is the former Director of the International Studies Stream (from 2000 to 2013) and was among the founders of the program in Urban Development and Social Change. He is a former Sociology Department Chair. He served as the elected Faculty Chair of Clark University from 2000 to 2006.

== Early life ==
Ross was born and raised in the Bronx, New York, and attended the renowned Bronx High School of Science. He grew up in a Jewish household imbued with social justice values and leftist politics. His stepfather, a cutter in the garment industry with a family history of union activism, and his mother, a teacher and social democrat, withdrew from politics out of fear of reprisals during the McCarthy era.

Ross received a B.A. from the University of Michigan (1963) and an M.A. (1966) and a Ph.D. (1975) from the University of Chicago. During a fellowship year in London, after completing his undergraduate degree, he studied with the distinguished British sociologist and academic Marxist Ralph Miliband.

== Students for a Democratic Society (SDS) ==
As an undergraduate at the University of Michigan, Ann Arbor, Ross became engaged with political activism on behalf of progressive causes and emerged as a student leader. Inspired by the sit-in movement against racial segregation that began in February 1960. Ross became part of the early leadership of Students for a Democratic Society (SDS). Ross attended the first SDS convention in June 1960 and became a founder of the Ann Arbor chapter. He helped enlist Tom Hayden who became SDS President. At an SDS meeting held at Ann Arbor in 1961, a National Executive Committee (NEC) was elected with Ross as vice president. As a delegate at the 1962 annual convention, and a member of the "drafting committee", Ross participated in writing the Port Huron Statement, which was adopted as the SDS political manifesto. His reading of C. Wright Mills' The Power Elite shaped Ross' intellectual contributions to the document. His senior honors thesis examined the theoretical basis for Mill's work.

== Scholarship ==
Ross has published widely on the globalization of capital and labor. In 1990, he co-authored Global Capitalism: the New Leviathan (SUNY Press).

Ross is a leading scholar and activist on the resurgence of sweatshops in the global apparel industry. Author of Slaves to Fashion: Poverty and Abuse in the New Sweatshops (University of Michigan Press), he is a member of the Board of Directors of the Sweatfree Purchasing Consortium and of the International Labor Rights Forum. In 2015, on the second anniversary of the Rana Plaza building collapse (killing 1,130 people and injuring 2,500) he traveled to Bangladesh to commemorate the victims and assess the steps taken to advance worker safety.
