= Campagnone Common =

Park in Lawrence, Massachusetts, United States

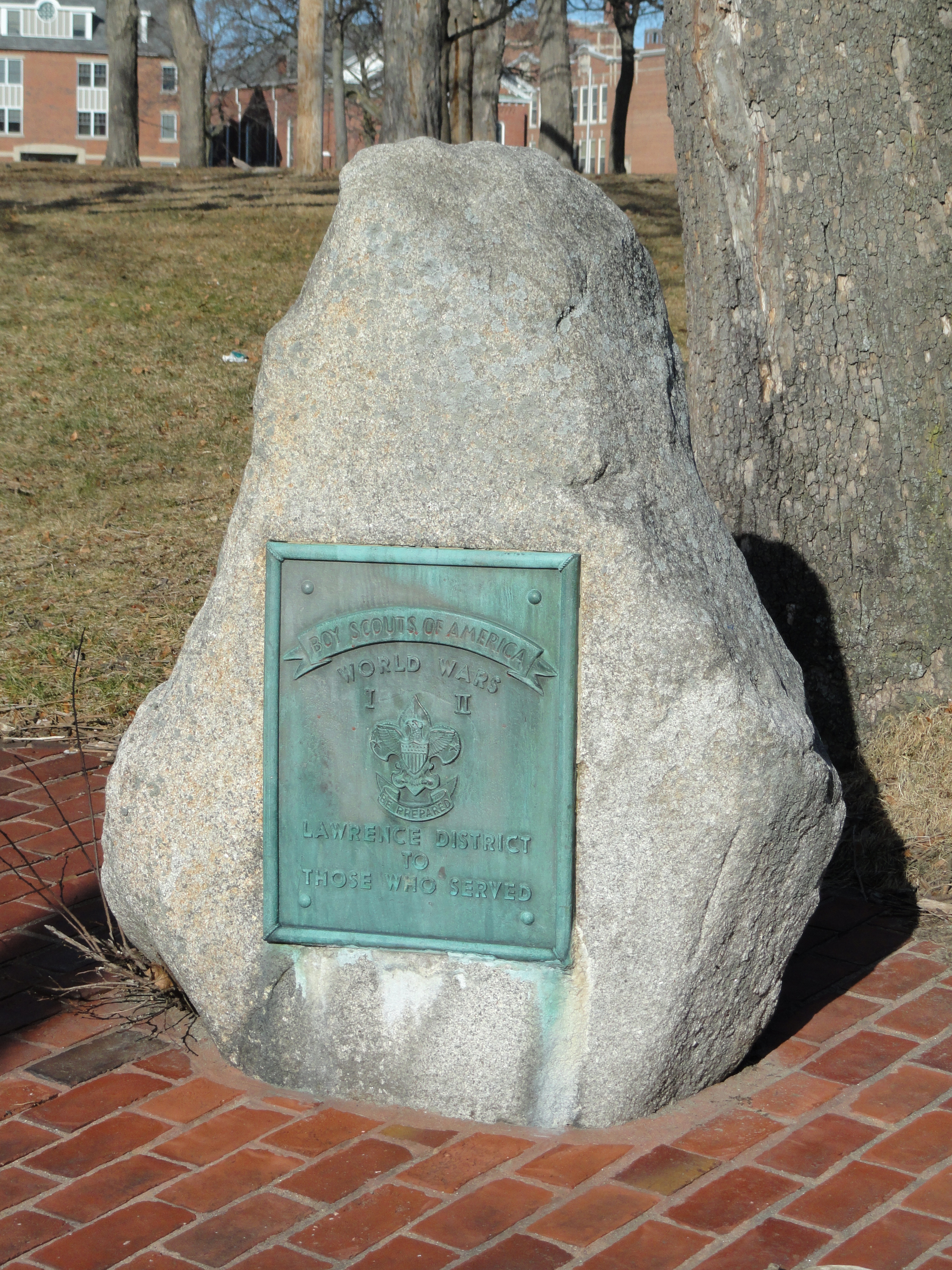
- Boy Scouts World Wars memorial
- Interactive map of Campagnone Common
- Location: Lawrence, Massachusetts
- Coordinates: 42.7094°N 71.16°W
- Status: Always open

Campagnone Common is a historic park in Lawrence, Massachusetts. The park is the main park for the city and is named for the three Campagnone brothers who gave their lives during World War II.

== Background ==
The park is located on Common Street and sits directly across from the Lawrence city hall. The park contains a baseball field, the Robert Frost Fountain, a playground located near Jackson Street.

The city has placed a number of war memorials at the park. There is a Civil War memorial, a World War II memorial, a Spanish-American War memorial, Gulf War memorial, and the Korean War memorial.
