= Miriam Schneir =

American author and feminist historian (born 1933)

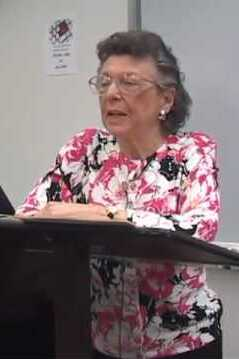
- Miriam Schneir in 2010
- Born: Miriam Blumberg; September 7, 1933 (age 92); Queens, New York
- Education: Queens College
- Occupations: Author; historian
- Spouse: Walter Schneir (m. 1958; died 2009)
- Children: 3
- Writing career
- Notable works: Invitation to an Inquest: A New Look at the Rosenberg-Sobell Case (1965); Feminism: The Essential Historical Writings (1972)

Miriam Schneir is an American writer and feminist historian. She is known for co-authoring books with her husband Walter Schneir on the Rosenberg espionage case. She also edited feminist anthologies that presented key texts dating back to the 18th century. In addition to her books, Schneir has written articles about education, politics, and women's history for The New York Times Magazine, The Nation, Ms., and other publications.

== Early life and education ==
Miriam Blumberg was born in 1933 and grew up in Queens, New York. She was raised in a middle-class Jewish family that she later said was not very interested in the areas which would occupy much of her adult life: politics, feminism, and cultural scholarship.

After high school, she attended Antioch College as a creative writing major. She then transferred to Queens College, where she studied early childhood education in order to obtain a teaching license. She said she chose teaching because there was greater financial security in that profession, and she had become interested in ideas about progressive education. In 1955, she graduated from Queens College, the first person in her family to graduate college.

In 1958, she married Walter Schneir. They had two sons and a daughter and made their home initially in Queens and later in Pleasantville.

== Political views ==
While in the fourth grade, Miriam Blumberg met Cynthia Fuchs-Epstein and they became lifelong friends. Fuchs-Epstein was from a more politically engaged family than the Blumbergs, and through this friendship Miriam began to cultivate her own political activism. As a teenager, she worked for the Henry Wallace presidential campaign of 1948, and then for Adlai Stevenson in the 1952 presidential election. In the late 1950s, she and Walter were active in the Committee for a Sane Nuclear Policy. During her time at Antioch, Miriam started to self-identify as a leftist. In an interview she said her political views were also influenced by communist colleagues she encountered in her years as a school teacher.

== Career ==
Following graduation, Schneir taught for several years, initially as an elementary teacher in the New York City school system, and then at the Child Development Center for emotionally disturbed preschool children. In 1960, she had the first of her three children and opted to become a full-time researcher and writer. The prior year, Walter had begun investigating the trial of Julius and Ethel Rosenberg and Morton Sobell who were convicted of conspiracy to commit espionage for the Soviet Union. The Rosenbergs were executed by electric chair in 1953, while Sobell received a thirty-year prison sentence. Miriam collaborated with her husband on the Rosenberg book project. The fruit of their effort was Invitation to an Inquest: A New Look at the Rosenberg-Sobell Case, published by Doubleday in 1965.

After completing the Rosenberg book, Miriam immersed herself in women's history. She worked as a research associate at the Columbia University Center for Social Sciences Program in Sex Roles and Social Change. In 1972, she compiled and edited the first of several anthologies, Feminism: The Essential Historical Writings. She contributed to the U.S. Bicentennial museum exhibit and catalogue book, Remember the Ladies: Women in America, 1750-1815. Under the auspices of Columbia Teachers College, she reviewed a multivolume encyclopedia's coverage and treatment of women; her recommendations were the basis for revising the encyclopedia.

=== Rosenberg case ===
The Schneirs began their research by studying the Rosenberg trial transcript. They found that the government's case was built almost entirely on the testimony of Ethel's brother, David Greenglass, and his wife Ruth. The Schneirs compared the recorded pretrial interviews of government witness Harry Gold against his testimony on the witness stand, and noticed important discrepancies. Miriam and Walter gradually reached the conclusion that the U.S. government had framed the Rosenbergs. In 1965, they published their controversial findings in the book, Invitation to an Inquest. They subsequently put out updated editions, with new material added, in 1968, 1973, and 1983.

In 1983, controversies erupted when Ronald Radosh and Joyce Milton published The Rosenberg File: A Search for Truth, which attacked the theses propounded in the Schneirs' book, and defended the government's prosecution of the Rosenbergs. The two sets of authors argued about the case both in the press and in an in-person debate. Miriam was a frequent speaker about the Rosenbergs at book talks, and on radio and television. In 2010, the Schneirs published Final Verdict: What Really Happened in the Rosenberg Case, with a Preface and Afterword by Miriam. It came out a year after Walter died. Drawing on recently available documents, the book concluded that David and Ruth Greenglass "were indeed guilty of trying to steal secrets of the atomic bomb but Julius and Ethel were not."

=== Feminist history ===
In a 2004 interview, Schneir recalled her initiation into feminist scholarship:

In the late 60s, I began to get glimmerings of interest in the condition of women and began to reflect on the subject a bit. As time went on, I began to read about it. And the more I read, the more interested I got. I went through a personal consciousness raising.... I thought I'd do an anthology. I had been reading women's writings and I had been reading some of the history of the suffrage movement and feminist writing, and I said, "If I'm so excited by this stuff, and it's all so new to me, other people should know about it, too."

She compiled a list of feminist works that she felt were essential for modern readers. She searched for a publisher for a proposed anthology, which would become Feminism: The Essential Historical Writings. She said her thinking about feminism was shaped by Eleanor Flexner, Gerda Lerner, Aileen Kraditor, Simone de Beauvoir, Betty Friedan, and the other writers and scholars she encountered while preparing the anthology. The book was published by Random House in 1972, and then re-issued in 1994 by Vintage Books. In 1994, she also published a follow-up anthology, Feminism in Our Time: The Essential Writings, World War II to the Present, which emphasized contemporary feminism.

== Bibliography ==
=== Books ===
- Schneir, Walter; Schneir, Miriam (1965). Invitation to an Inquest: A New Look at the Rosenberg-Sobell Case (1st ed.). Garden City, NY: Doubleday & Company. LCCN 64011751. OCLC 500023.
- Schneir, Miriam, ed. (1972). Feminism: The Essential Historical Writings (1st ed.). New York: Random House. ISBN 978-0394471914.
- De Pauw, Linda Grant; Hunt, Conover; Schneir, Miriam (1976). Remember the Ladies: Women in America, 1750-1815. New York: Viking Press. ISBN 978-0670593620.
- Schneir, Walter; Schneir, Miriam (1983). Invitation to an Inquest: Reopening the Rosenberg "Atom Spy" Case (Revised and expanded ed.). New York: Pantheon Books. ISBN 0394714962. OCLC 9082135.
- Schneir, Miriam, ed. (1994). Feminism: The Essential Historical Writings (Revised ed.). New York: Vintage Books. ISBN 978-0679753810.
- Schneir, Miriam, ed. (1994). Feminism in Our Time: The Essential Writings, World War II to the Present. New York: Vintage Books. ISBN 978-0679745082.
- Schneir, Miriam, ed. (1996). The Vintage Book of Historical Feminism. London: Trafalgar Square. ISBN 978-0099597810.
- Schneir, Walter; Schneir, Miriam (2010). Final Verdict: What Really Happened in the Rosenberg Case. Brooklyn, NY: Melville House. ISBN 978-1935554165.
- Schneir, Miriam (2021). Before Feminism: The History of an Idea Without a Name. Mews Books. ISBN 978-0578857602.

=== Selected articles ===
- Schneir, Walter; Schneir, Miriam (April 4, 1971). "The Joy of Learning – In the Open Corridor". The New York Times Sunday Magazine.
- Schneir, Miriam (September 1972). "The Woman Who Ran for President in 1972". Ms.
- Schneir, Miriam (July 1974). "A Note on the Centennial". Ms.
- Schneir, Walter; Schneir, Miriam (March 30, 1985). "The Right's Attack on the Press" (PDF). The Nation.
- Schneir, Walter; Schneir, Miriam (June 17, 1999). "Cables Coming in from the Cold". The Nation.
- Schneir, Walter; Schneir, Miriam (April 16, 2009). "Cables Coming in from the Cold". The Nation.
- Schneir, Miriam (March 6, 2024). "Lost Women: Harriet H. Robinson, An American Mill Girl". Ms. Originally published in the August 1972 edition of Ms.
